= Timeline of the Russo-Ukrainian war (1 September – 30 November 2023) =

Daily log of ongoing military conflict

Timeline of the Russo-Ukrainian war (2022–present)
- Prelude; (up to 23 February 2022); Initial invasion; (24 February – 7 April 2022); Southeastern front; (8 April – 28 August 2022); 2022 Ukrainian counteroffensives; (29 August – 11 November 2022); Second stalemate; (12 November 2022 – 7 June 2023); 2023 Ukrainian counteroffensive; (8 June 2023 – 31 August 2023); 2023 Ukrainian counteroffensive, cont.; (1 September – 30 November 2023); 2023–2024 winter campaigns; (1 December 2023 – 31 March 2024); 2024 spring and summer campaigns; (1 April – 31 July 2024); 2024 summer–autumn offensives; (1 August – 31 December 2024); 2025 winter–spring offensives; (1 January 2025 – 31 May 2025); 2025 summer offensives; (1 June 2025 – 31 August 2025); 2025 autumn–winter offensives; (1 September 2025 – 31 December 2025); 2026 winter–spring offensives; (1 January 2026 – present)

This timeline of the Russo-Ukrainian war covers the period from 1 September to 30 November 2023 during the 2023 Ukrainian counteroffensive.

== September 2023 ==
=== 1 September ===
In Russia, three drones were intercepted by air defenses over Pskov and Belgorod Oblasts, while another reportedly hit a factory that manufactured electronic components for rockets in Lyubertsy, Moscow Oblast, forcing the closure of airports in the area. At least two buildings were reportedly damaged in another drone attack in Kurchatov, Kursk Oblast.

One person was killed by Russian shelling in Kherson.

The British weapons firm BAE Systems opened a branch in Ukraine as part of preparations to produce light artillery there.

Two container ships left Odesa through the temporary corridor introduced by Ukraine in the Black Sea.

The Ukrainian National Agency for Corruption Prevention (NACP) included PepsiCo and Mars, Incorporated to its list of international sponsors of the Russian war effort in Ukraine for continuing to operate in Russia.

Satellite images revealed that Russia had withdrawn air defences, artillery and tanks from the Kuril Islands as part of a possible redeployment to Ukraine.

The first Ukrainian crewmen completed their training on M1A1 Abrams tanks in the United States in anticipation of their delivery to Ukraine. However, their training was extended upon request by the Ukrainian government.

=== 2 September ===
Russia claimed to have destroyed three naval drones attempting to attack the Crimean Bridge, while the governor of Belgorod Oblast claimed that Ukrainian shelling killed one person in Urazovo.

The Ukrainian military claimed to have breached the first line of Russian defenses in the Zaporizhzhia front and were now pushing towards the succeeding defense line.

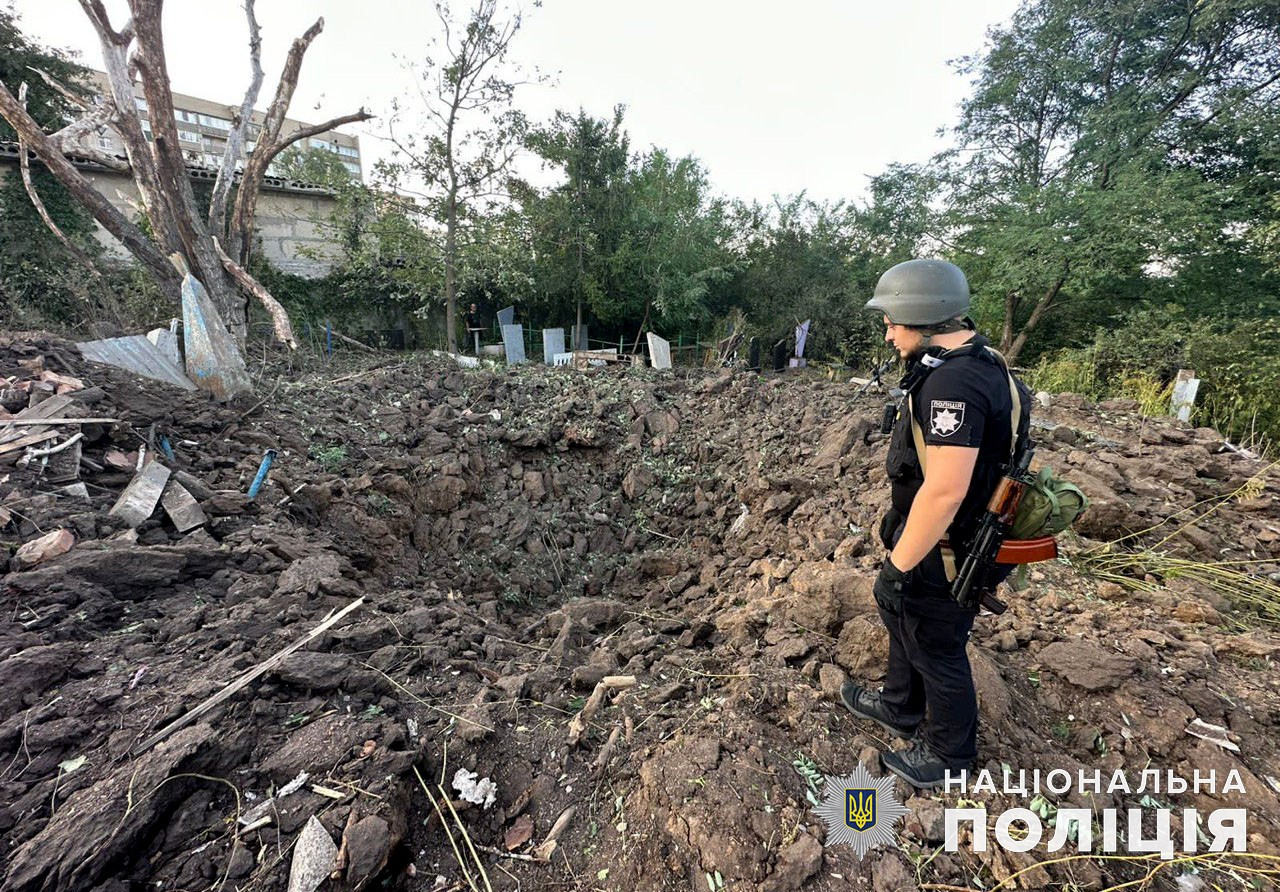
Cemetery in Kramatorsk (Donetsk region) after a rocket strike

Four people, including a police officer, were killed by Russian attacks in Donetsk, Kherson and Sumy Oblasts.

The United States pledged depleted uranium armor-piercing rounds that can be fired from M1A1 Abrams tanks it was sending to Ukraine as part of a new military aid package valued at $240-$375 million.

A spokesperson for the Ukrainian Air Force said that the US would supply Ukraine with AMRAAM missiles, with Raytheon signing a contract to supply them to Ukraine valued at $192 million.

=== 3 September ===
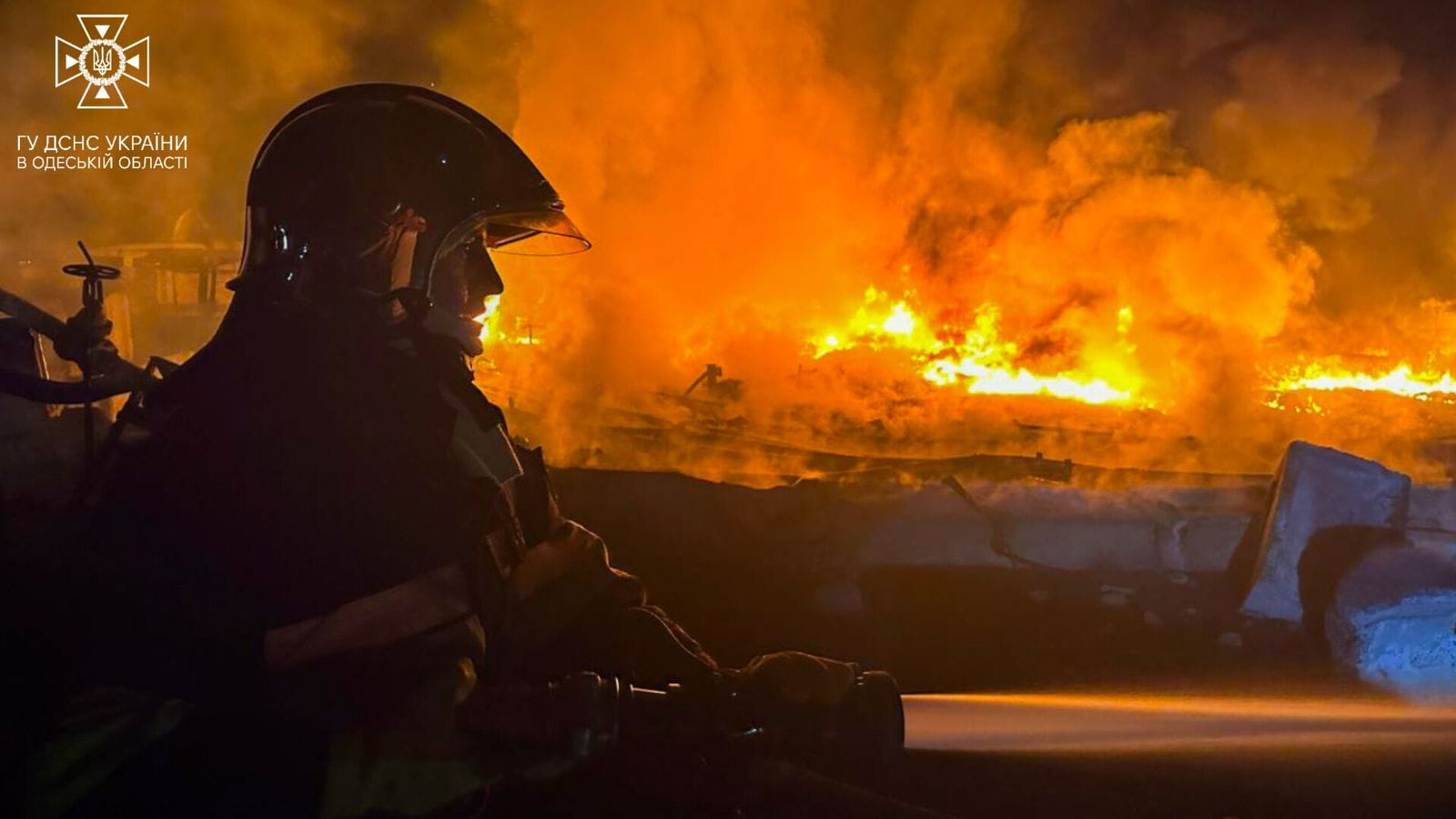
Fire in Odesa region after a drone attack

Russia launched an overnight drone attack on the port of Reni, injuring two people. The Ukrainian Air force claimed to have shot down 23 of 25 drones launched. Two people were killed in separate attacks in Donetsk and Kherson Oblast.

Ukraine claimed to have destroyed a Russian KS-701 patrol boat using a Bayraktar TB2 drone in the Black Sea, killing six and wounding two. In a separate attack in Luhansk Oblast, a Russian TOS-1A Solntsepyok heavy flamethrower system was reportedly destroyed by a drone, killing its crew.

Ukraine president Volodymyr Zelenskyy announced the dismissal of his Defence Minister Oleksii Reznikov and his replacement by Rustem Umierov, the manager of the State Property Fund of Ukraine and a negotiator in talks with Russia throughout the war. Zelenskyy said he had based his decision on finding "new approaches" for the ministry, which had also been caught up in several corruption scandals in recent weeks. Umierov's appointment was confirmed by the Verkhovna Rada on 6 September.

In Russia, Roman Starovoit, governor of Kursk Oblast, claimed that a Ukrainian drone was shot down over Kurchatov, with falling debris setting fire to a "non-residential building".

President Zelenskyy said France had agreed to help train Ukrainian pilots on the use of F-16 fighter jets.

=== 4 September ===
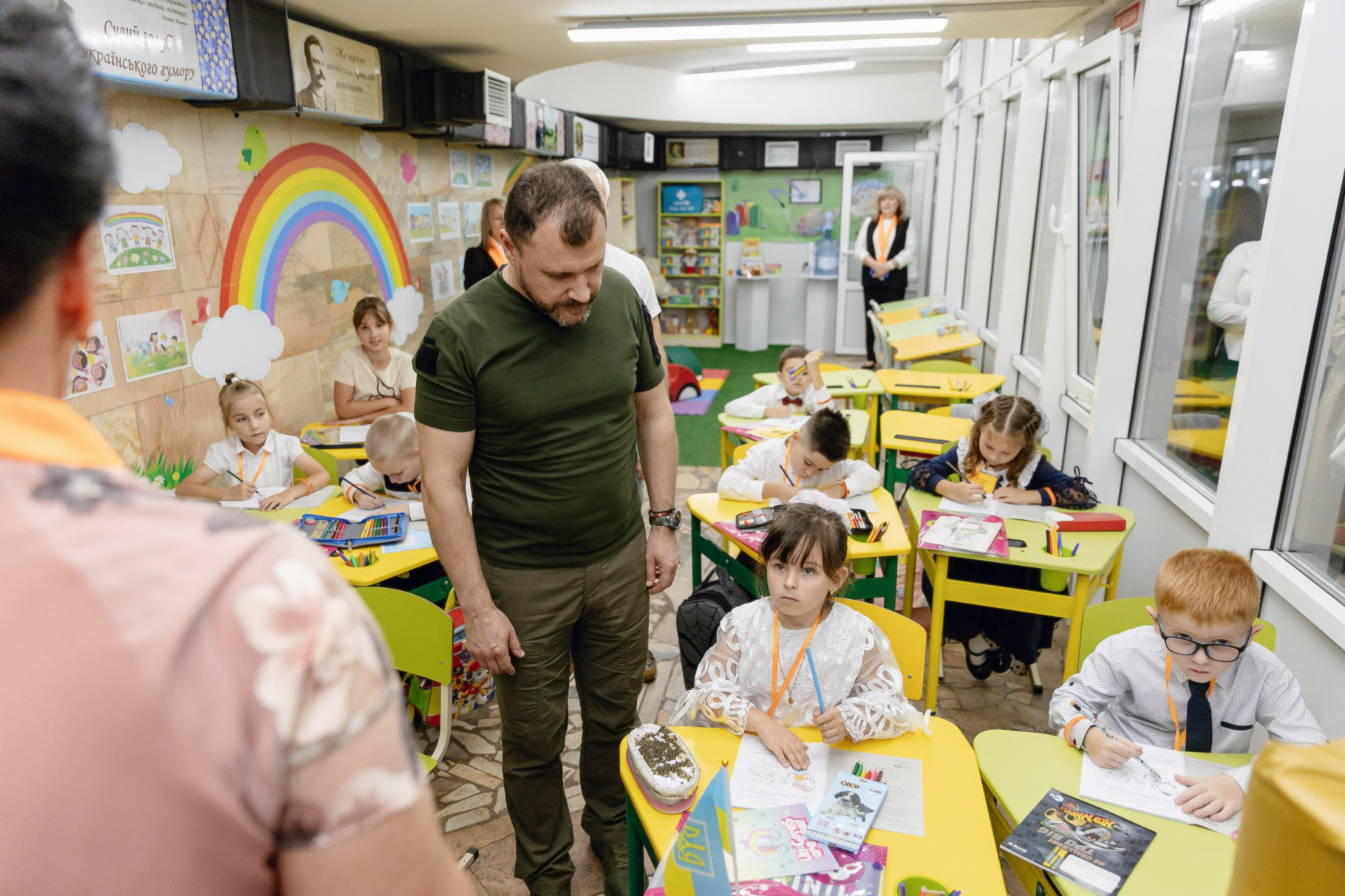
School lessons in Kharkiv, conducted in the metro due to the danger of shelling

Russia claimed to have shot down two drones over the Black Sea and in Kursk Oblast and destroyed four Ukrainian landing boats heading towards Crimea. It also launched an overnight drone attack on Ukraine's Danube ports, damaging several buildings but causing no injuries. Ukraine claimed to have shot down 23 of 32 drones launched, with Romania saying drone parts fell on its territory. NATO said it did not believe that the spillover constituted a deliberate attack by Russia. In response, the Romanian government introduced additional security measures on the border settlements of Plauru and Ceatalchioi. One person was killed by shelling in Zaporizhzhia Oblast.

The Ukrainian Defence Ministry said its forces had retaken three square kilometers of territory around Bakhmut in the past week.

President Zelenskyy made another visit to Ukrainian positions in the Donetsk and Zaporizhzhia fronts.

A court in Russian-occupied Donetsk Oblast sentenced two Ukrainian soldiers to more than 20 years' imprisonment for alleged war crimes during the Siege of Mariupol.

Russian media reported that T-14 Armata tanks were withdrawn from service in Ukraine after being deployed in indirect fire roles to test them in "real combat conditions".

Belgium pledged eight RIM-7 Sea Sparrow missiles to Ukraine.

=== 5 September ===
Russia claimed to have shot down four drones over Tver, Kaluga, Moscow, and Bryansk Oblasts.

A Ukrainian Challenger 2 was destroyed near Robotyne, the first time a tank of that model was destroyed by a belligerent in action.

Yury Afanasyevsky, head of the customs office of the Russian-installed Luhansk People's Republic, was reportedly injured in a bomb attack at his home.

Cuba announced the discovery of a human trafficking network that recruited its nationals to fight in Ukraine under Russian military forces, denouncing it as an act of "mercenarism", and arrested 17 people.

Germany delivered a military aid package to Ukraine that included 188 Mercedes-Benz Zetros off-road trucks, four border protection vehicles, a Beaver bridge-laying tank, 20,000 pairs of safety glasses, and ammunition for Flakpanzer Gepard self-propelled anti-aircraft guns.

=== 6 September ===
Missile strike on Kostiantynivka marketplace

A missile struck the central market of Kostiantynivka, Donetsk Oblast, killing at least 17 people including a child, and injuring 33 others.

A Russian drone attacked the port of Izmail, killing one person.

President Zelenskyy announced the transfer of Pavlo Kyrylenko from his position as governor of Donetsk Oblast to become head of the Antimonopoly Committee of Ukraine.

US Secretary of State Antony Blinken visited Kyiv and announced another aid package to Ukraine valued at more than $1 billion, which included about $665 million worth of security assistance and $175 million in military hardware that included HIMARS artillery, Javelin antitank weapons, Abrams tanks, and depleted uranium ammunition. France also delivered 150 Delair drones to Ukraine.

Ukraine claimed that a HIMARS strike on the village of Myronivs'kyi in occupied Donetsk Oblast destroyed a stockpile of Vikhr missiles used by Russian Ka-52 attack helicopters.

=== 7 September ===
Another wave of drone attacks was reported across Russia. In Rostov-on-Don, one person was injured and three buildings were damaged in a reported strike by two drones at the headquarters of the Southern Military District. Another drone was shot down over Moscow Oblast. A drone fell on a military facility in Volgograd Oblast, while another drone caused a fire at an industrial facility in Bryansk.

More than 270,000 tonnes of grain were reportedly destroyed by a Russian drone attack in the Danube river ports. Ukraine claimed to have shot down 14 drones. Two people were killed by Russian shelling in Kherson and Zaporizhzhia Oblasts.

Ukrainian border guards reclaimed the frontier settlements of Stroivka and Topoli, both of which lay in a recently de-mined "gray zone" between Ukrainian and Russian positions in Kharkiv Oblast.

The British Royal Air Force began surveillance flights over the Black Sea to protect grain shipments from Russian attacks.

The Pentagon pledged another military aid package to Ukraine worth $600 million which included air defense equipment, additional ammunition for HIMARS systems, 105 mm artillery rounds, electronic warfare, mine-clearing equipment, demolition munitions, training, and maintenance support.

A court in Abakan, Russia, sentenced journalist Mikhail Afanasyev to more than 5 years in prison and a 2.5-year ban on him practicing his profession for reporting on antiwar sentiment in Khakassia.

UNESCO approved a request by Ukraine to place 20 landmarks to the international list of cultural heritage sites under enhanced protection to deter military attacks. The sites included the Kyiv Pechersk Lavra, the Historic Centre of Lviv, Taras Hill in Cherkasy Oblast, the Derzhprom building in Kharkiv, and the wooden churches of the Carpathian regions.

The US and the UK sanctioned 11 members of the Russian cybercrime group Trickbot for launching ransomware attacks on foreign entities and targeting critics of the invasion of Ukraine.

=== 8 September ===
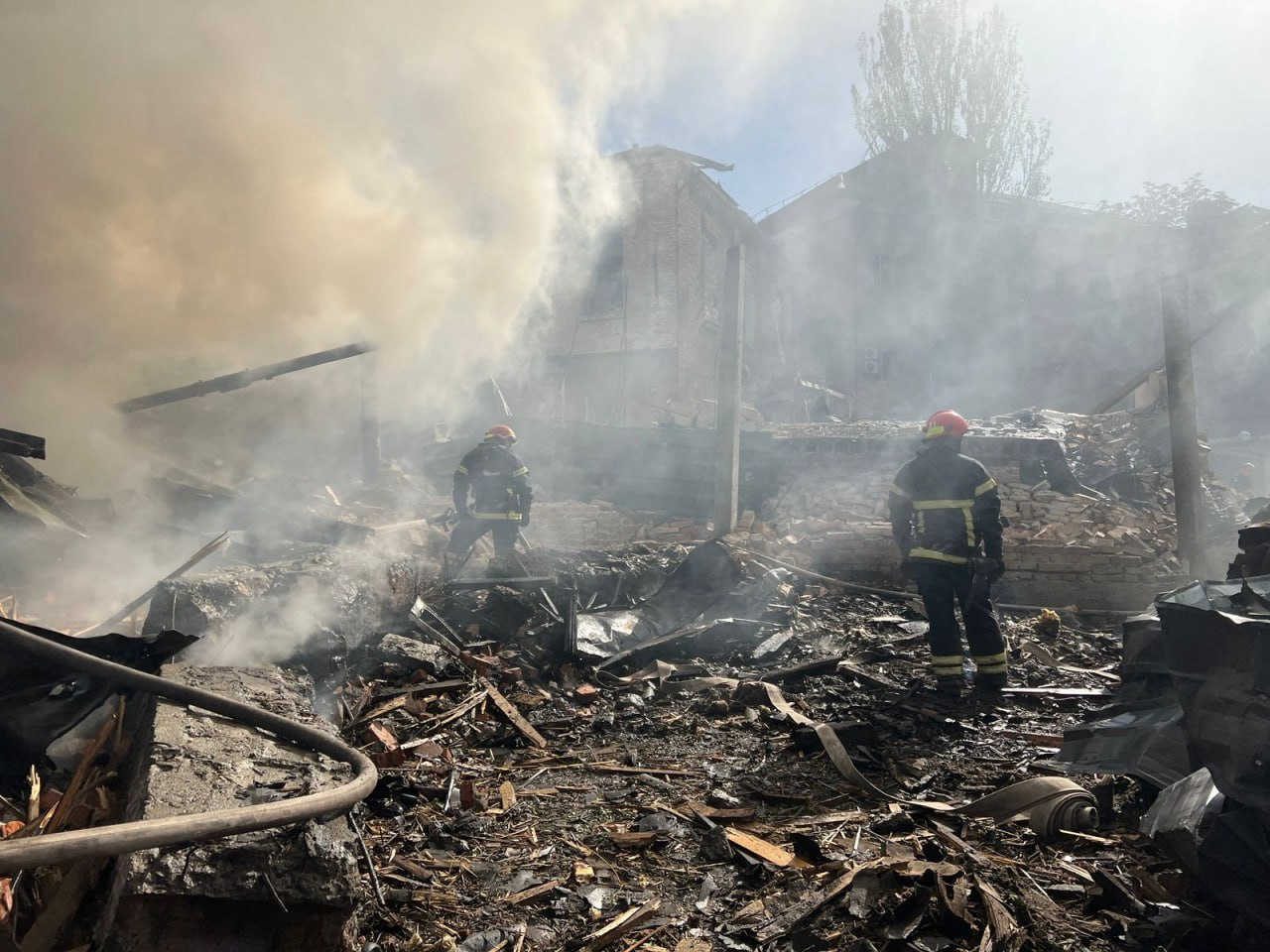
Destroyed police station in Kryvyi Rih

Russia launched a wave of missile attacks on cities across Ukraine, including in Zaporizhzhia and Sumy. In Kryvyi Rih, a police officer was killed and 74 others were injured in a missile strike on a police station, while 69 structures were damaged. Three people were killed by Russian shelling in Kherson Oblast.

The Ukrainian military claimed to have retaken more than half of the village of Klishchiivka, south of Bakhmut, while noting that Russia had assembled a strike force near the village of Novohryhorivka in Luhansk Oblast in preparation for an offensive towards Lyman.

Russia began holding local sham elections in occupied areas of Ukraine until 10 September. During polling, the exiled mayor of Melitopol claimed that the regional headquarters of the United Russia party was destroyed in an incendiary incident, producing casualties on Russian authorities.

The Ukrainian government announced the repatriation of nine children deported to Russia, one of whom was imprisoned for allegedly blowing up a bridge.

Lithuania delivered 1.5 million rounds of ammunition to Ukraine.

=== 9 September ===
One person was killed by Russian shelling in Kherson Oblast. A Canadian volunteer for the non-government organisation (NGO) Road to Relief and the organization's Spanish director were killed after their vehicle came under Russian artillery fire near Chasiv Yar. Two other foreign volunteers were wounded.

A Russian soldier guarding polling stations during the Russian-organized local elections was reportedly killed in a car bombing in Nova Kakhovka by Ukrainian partisans, who also hacked into Russian television broadcasts in Crimea and called for a boycott of the elections.

The Russian-installed head of Crimea Sergey Aksyonov claimed three drones were shot down over the peninsula.

The G20 issued a joint declaration at the end of its annual meeting in New Delhi that produced a milder stance on the invasion of Ukraine compared with the previous summit held in Bali, avoiding mention of Russian involvement in the conflict.

Major General Kyrylo Budanov, chief of Ukrainian military intelligence, said that their counteroffensive would go on into winter.

=== 10 September ===
Russia launched an overnight drone attack on Kyiv, injuring one person in the Podil neighborhood. Ukraine claimed to have shot down more than 24 drones launched. One person was killed in a separate attack in Zaporizhzhia Oblast.

Eight Ukrainian drones were reportedly shot down by Russian air defenses near Crimea, while Russia also claimed to have destroyed three Ukrainian military transport vessels north-east of Snake Island.

South Korean president Yoon Suk-yeol announced the establishment of a $2.3 billion aid package to Ukraine for humanitarian and postwar recovery concerns.

=== 11 September ===
The Ukrainian defence ministry claimed its forces had retaken parts of the village of Opytne, three kilometers northwest of Donetsk, as well as 4.8 square kilometers of territory in the southern front over the past week.

Ukrainian military intelligence claimed that special forces had recovered several oil and gas drilling platforms off the Crimean coast that had been occupied and fortified by Russia since 2015. Among the facilities retaken were the Boyko Towers platforms and the 'Tavryda' and 'Syvash' mobile rigs following clashes during which a Russian Su-30 fighter jet, according to Ukrainian sources, tried to sink the assault boats with various weapons. Initially it was shot at with "service weapons" until it was reportedly struck by a Ukrainian MANPAD, damaging it and forcing it to retreat. Ukrainian forces also seized helicopter ammunition and a Neva radar system from the sites.

The Ukrainian military claimed to have struck a Russian drone base in Luhanske, occupied Donetsk Oblast.

In Russia, two drones were reportedly shot down over Belgorod Oblast, while two houses were reportedly damaged in a drone attack on Rylsk, Kursk Oblast.

Rheinmetall pledged 40 Marder infantry fighting vehicles to Ukraine as part of an order placed by the German government.

Russia began manufacturing upgraded T-80BVM tanks equipped with protection from drone attacks and top attack anti-tank missiles following observations in Ukraine.

Russian media reported that the National Guard, Rosgvardia, had begun recruiting former convicts who served in Ukraine as members of the Wagner Group.

=== 12 September ===
Three people were killed by Russian shelling in Donetsk and Luhansk Oblasts.

Denmark pledged a 5.8-billion-Danish-kroner ($830 million) military aid package to Ukraine that would include tanks, infantry fighting vehicles, ammunition, and anti-aircraft guns.

The NGO Save Ukraine returned 13 children in Russian-occupied areas in Ukraine to relatives living in Kyiv-controlled territory.

=== 13 September ===
The Russian-appointed governor of Sevastopol Mikhail Razvozhaev claimed that the Sevastopol Shipyard was struck by a Ukrainian "missile attack" at 2 am, causing a large fire. The Russian Ministry of Defence claimed that 10 cruise missiles were fired, with 7 shot down. The attack also involved three "maritime drones", which were all destroyed. The Ministry said, "As a result of being hit by enemy cruise missiles, two ships under repair were damaged". At least 24 people were reported injured. The ships damaged were identified as the landing ship Minsk and the Rostov-na-Donu, a Kilo-class submarine. The Ukrainian Air Force confirmed that Storm Shadow missiles were used. The Institute for the Study of War (ISW) later assessed that 62 Russian servicemen were killed in the attack.

Russia launched an overnight drone attack on Izmail, injuring six people.

Ukrainian soldiers from the 3rd Assault Brigade released footage of first person drones destroying a T-90A tank near Bakhmut. The footage was undated but believed to have been filmed in early August.

A court in Russian-occupied Donetsk Oblast sentenced two alleged members of the Azov Regiment to 29 years' imprisonment for alleged war crimes during the Siege of Mariupol.

Germany delivered a military aid package to Ukraine that included 20 Marder infantry fighting vehicles, a Satcom surveillance system, 20 RQ-35 HEIDRUN reconnaissance drones, two mobile antenna mast systems, 10 drone detection systems, two WISENT 1 mine clearing tanks, explosive ordnance disposal material, 3,000 155 mm artillery shells, 1.5 million small arms ammunition rounds, an 8x8 HX81 truck tractor train, four semi-trailers, nine transport vehicles, five 8x8 load-handling trucks, and three ambulances.

The European Parliament formally recognized Belarusian President Aleksandr Lukashenko as an "accomplice" to Russian war crimes in Ukraine, particularly for staging Russian troops and hosting deported children.

=== 14 September ===
Russia claimed to have shot down four drones over Bryansk Oblast. It also claimed to have destroyed 16 aerial and naval drones in Crimea, with explosions reported in the vicinity of a Russian military garrison near the village of Uiutne, outside Yevpatoriya. At the same time, Russian officials closed the Crimean Bridge to traffic. Ukrainian forces subsequently claimed to have destroyed S-300 and S-400 missile systems near Yevpatoriya using drones and R-360 Neptune missiles and damaged the Russian patrol ships Sergei Kotov and Vasily Bykov in a separate attack in the Black Sea; the Russian Ministry of Defence claimed that the Vasily Bykov engaged and destroyed three Ukrainian naval drones when escorting the merchant vessels Yaz and Ursa Major, the latter an alleged arms-runner, heading towards Istanbul. Another Russian vessel, the corvette Samun was reportedly hit by a Ukrainian naval drone as it entered Sevastopol Bay.

A six-year-old child was killed by Russian shelling in Novodmitryk, Kherson Oblast. Later in the day, authorities ordered the mandatory evacuation of families with children in 31 settlements across the oblast.

Vasily Popov, commander of the Russian 247th Guards Air Assault Regiment, was reportedly killed in action in Ukraine according to the ISW.

Ukrainian Prosecutor-General Andriy Kostin announced that the International Criminal Court opened a field office in Kyiv to improve its effectiveness in its investigation in Russian war crimes, calling the office the ICC's largest after its headquarters in The Hague.

In response to spillovers from Russian drone attacks on Ukrainian Danube ports, Romania imposed a ban on aircraft flying at an altitude of less than 4,000 meters (more than 13,000 feet) over a zone within 30 kilometers (19 miles) of the eastern section of the Ukrainian border, in the vicinity of the ports of Sulina and Galați.

The United States announced sanctions on more than 100 individuals and entities involved in the Russian war effort in Ukraine. Among those sanctioned included Russian oligarch Andrei Bokarev, the head of major rolling stock manufacturer Transmashholding, his business partner Iskandar Makhmudov, and their family members, as well as Russian Deputy Defense Minister Aleksei Krivoruchko and Mkrtich Okroyan, the chief designer and board member for two Russian aerospace companies. Among companies sanctioned were Finnish and Turkish entities exporting goods to Russia, and leading Russian banking, investment, manufacturing, construction, and electronics firms. Meanwhile, the EU lifted sanctions against Russian businessmen Grigory Berezkin, Farkhad Akhmedov, and Alexander Shulgin.

=== 15 September ===
The Ukrainian military claimed it had retaken full control of the village of Andriivka, south of Bakhmut. It also accused Russia of accidentally dropping a bomb on occupied Nova Kakhovka and blaming Ukraine for the incident.

The Russian patrol boat Askold was reportedly attacked by Ukraine in the Black Sea.

The Security Service of Ukraine (SBU) formally charged former MP Nestor Shufrych for treason and working with Russian intelligence.

UNESCO formally placed the Saint Sophia Cathedral in Kyiv, the Kyiv-Pechersk Lavra, and the Old Town of Lviv on its List of World Heritage in Danger, citing the continued threat posed by the Russian invasion.

The United States provided the Ukrainian military with 3D printers to manufacture spare parts for military equipment.

The European Commission lifted a ban on the import of Ukrainian grain to Poland, Bulgaria, Hungary, Romania and Slovakia that had been in place since May 2023 to protect domestic production. However, Poland, Hungary and Slovakia stated that they would continue to enforce the ban.

The United Kingdom formally designated the Wagner Group as a terrorist organisation.

=== 16 September ===
Two people were killed after a car was attacked by Russian forces near the border village of Strilecha, Kharkiv Oblast. Five others were injured in a missile attack on the Kholodnohirskyi district in Kharkiv city.

In Russia, two drones were reportedly shot down over Tver and Kaluga Oblasts. One person was reportedly killed by shelling in the border village of Plekhovo, Kursk Oblast.

The Palauan-flagged cargo ships Resilient Africa and Aroyat arrived at the port of Chornomorsk, Odesa Oblast to load grain, the first vessels to do so under the maritime corridor introduced by Ukraine following the collapse of the Black Sea Grain Initiative.

Commander of the 47th Mechanized Brigade Lieutenant Colonel Oleksandr Sak was sacked and replaced by Colonel Oleksandr Pavlii who had previously commanded the 112th Separate Brigade of the Territorial Defence Forces in Kyiv since 2022.

=== 17 September ===
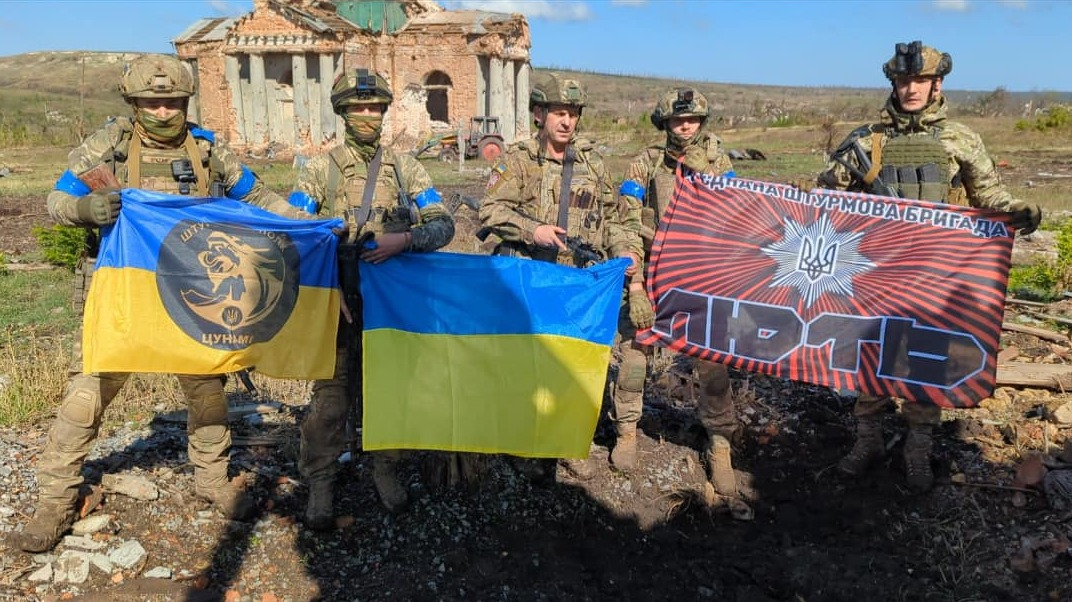
Ukrainian military in retaken Klishchiivka

One person was killed by Russian shelling in Sumy Oblast. Four others were killed in separate attacks in Kherson Oblast.

The Ukrainian military claimed it had retaken Klishchiivka. Explosions were reported in Tokmak and in Sevastopol, with the latter occurring near Russian radio intelligence and air defence facilities.

Colonel Andrei Kondrashkin, commander of the Russian 31st Guards Air Assault Brigade, was reportedly killed in action in Andriivka, near Bakhmut.

Russia claimed to have shot down five drones over Crimea and Moscow Oblast, while another damaged an oil depot in Oryol.

Canada pledged $33 million CAD ($24.4 million) in military aid to Ukraine as part of a joint initiative with other Western countries to improve the country's air defence capabilities.

Ukraine formally filed lawsuits in the World Trade Organization against Poland, Slovakia and Hungary for their continued refusal to lift their ban on imports of Ukrainian grain, saying that their actions violated international obligations.

=== 18 September ===
President Zelenskyy ordered the dismissal of deputy defence ministers Hanna Maliar, Vitalii Deyneha, Denys Sharapov, Volodymyr Havrylov, Andrii Shevchenko and Rostyslav Zamlynskyi, as well as the ministry's state secretary, Kostiantyn Vashchenko. Prior to her dismissal, Maliar announced that Ukrainian forces had retaken two square kilometers (0.77 square miles) of territory around Bakhmut and 5.2 square kilometers of territory in the southern front in the past week. Army commander Oleksandr Syrskyi also claimed Ukrainian forces had breached the Russian defensive lines stretching from Bakhmut to Horlivka, and that the Russian military's 72nd Separate Motor Rifle Brigade, the 31st Guards Air Assault Brigade and the 83rd Air Assault Brigade were severely decimated and put out of action during the fighting.

Ukraine reportedly launched a HIMARS missile strike on a command post of the Russian 70th Motorized Rifle Division in Radensk, Kherson Oblast, killing eight officers and injuring seven others. Ukrainian military intelligence claimed that an An-148, an Ilyushin Il-20 and a Mil Mi-28 helicopter was damaged or destroyed in a sabotage attack at Chkalovsky Air Base near Moscow.

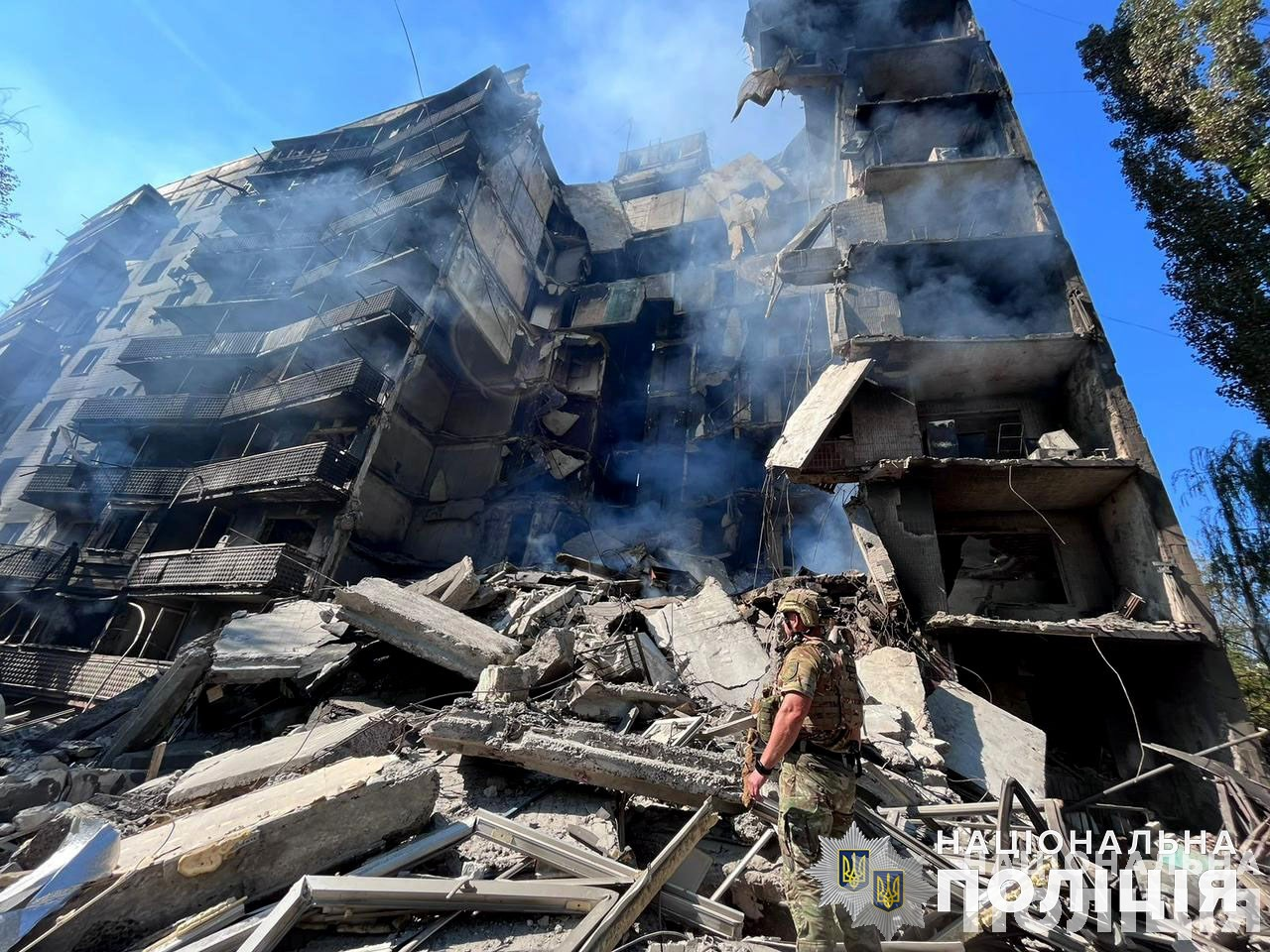
Residential building in Avdiivka (Donetsk Oblast) after the attack

Seven people were killed by Russian shelling in Donetsk and Kherson Oblasts.

Denis Pushilin, the head of the Russian-installed Donetsk People's Republic claimed that the offices of the regional administration in Donetsk city were damaged by a Ukrainian airstrike.

Russia claimed to have shot down three aerial projectiles over Belgorod Oblast.

Germany pledged a €400 million ($430 million) military aid package to Ukraine that would include explosives, mortar ammunition, rockets, armored vehicles, demining equipment, clothing and power generators for the winter, while South Korea pledged two K600 anti-mine vehicles.

=== 19 September ===
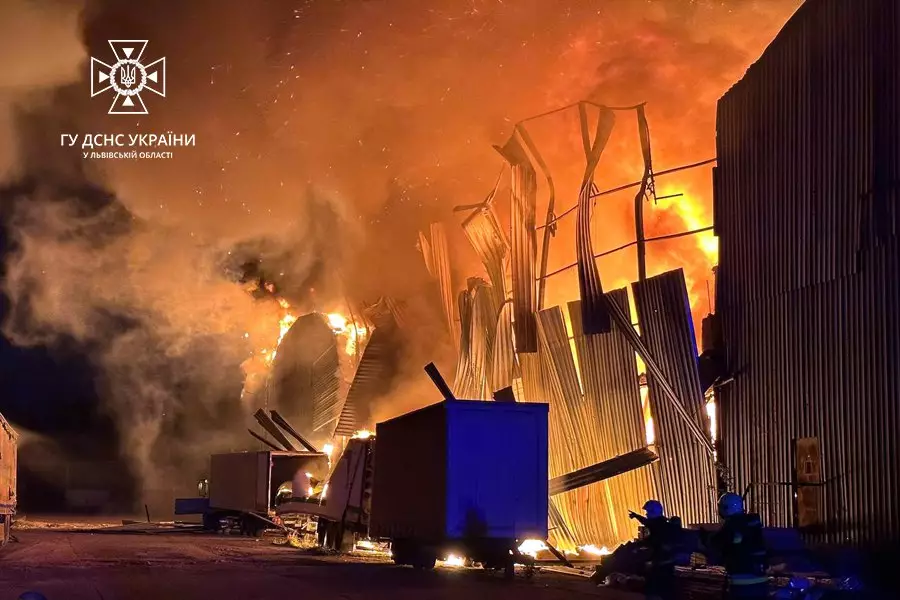
Warehouse in Lviv region after the attack

Russia launched an early morning drone attack on Lviv, killing one person, injuring another and setting fire to a warehouse of the humanitarian organisation Caritas-Spes, resulting in the loss of 300 tons of relief supplies. Two people, including a police sergeant, were killed in a separate attack on a trolleybus in Kherson. Six people were killed in an airstrike in Kupiansk.

Russia claimed two drones were shot down over Belgorod and Oryol Oblasts.

The Ukrainian government said that the cargo ship Resilient Africa left Chornomorsk after loading grain and was now heading to Istanbul. It also announced that it would ban the import of Polish fruits and vegetables into the country in retaliation for Warsaw's continued ban on Ukrainian grain.

Belarusian state media reported the arrival in the country of 48 children taken from Russian-occupied territories of Ukraine as part of what it called a "holiday" organized by a charity supported by President Lukashenko.

Denmark pledged 15 T-72EA tanks and 30 Leopard 1 tanks to Ukraine.

=== 20 September ===
An oil refinery in Kremenchuk was set on fire following a Russian drone attack, while a Ukrainian Air Force MiG-29 was struck by a Lancet drone at Dolgintsevo air base near Kryvyi Rih. Four people were killed by shelling in Toretsk and in the adjacent settlement of Pivnichne in Donetsk Oblast. A car carrying two Swedish journalists was attacked by a drone in Zaporizhzhia Oblast, injuring their Ukrainian officer and two police escorts.

The Russian-installed governor of Sevastopol, Mikhail Razvozhayev, claimed Russian forces stopped two attacks on the city which involved Ukrainian naval drones and missiles, respectively. Ukraine claimed to have struck a command post of the Black Sea Fleet near Belbek air base.

In Russia, a fuel storage tank caught fire near Sochi airport following a suspected drone attack.

Polish Prime Minister Mateusz Morawiecki announced that the country would no longer supply Ukraine with weapons in response to disputes over the flow of agricultural products between the two countries. The Polish government later clarified that it would continue to honor preexisting agreements to deliver weapons to Ukraine.

=== 21 September ===
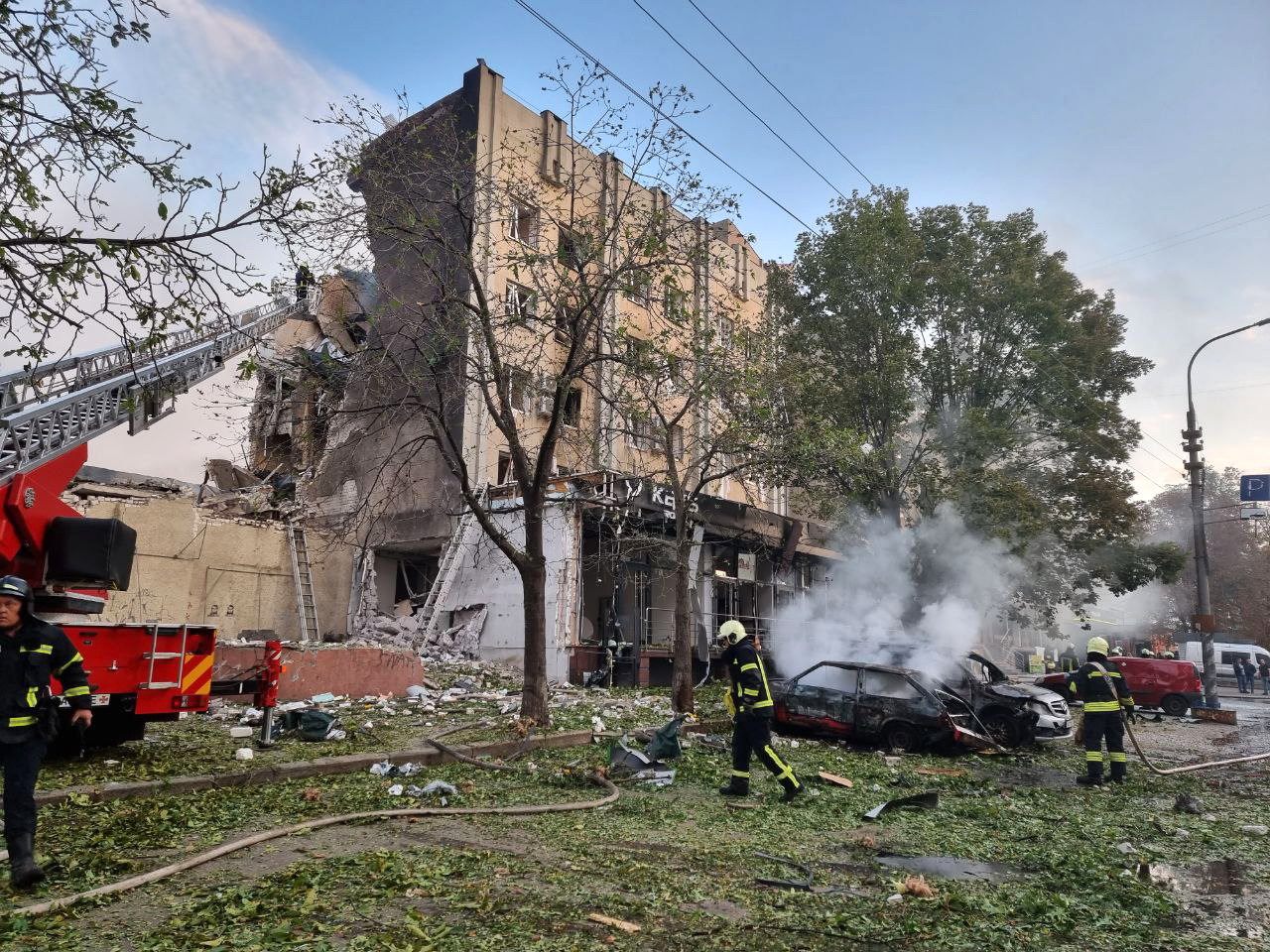
Damaged hotel in Cherkasy

Russia launched a series of missile attacks across Ukraine. In Kyiv, falling debris set a residential building on fire and hospitalised two, including a child. In Cherkasy, falling debris damaged a hotel and injured several people. Other explosions were reported in Kharkiv, Khmelnytskyi, Rivne, Vinnytsia, Lviv and Ivano-Frankivsk. More than 20 people were reportedly injured in the attacks, which was also the first strikes on Ukrainian energy infrastructure in six months. The Ukrainian Air Force claimed to have shot down 36 of 43 missiles launched. Seven people were killed and 11 others were injured in separate attacks in Kherson Oblast.

The Ukrainian military claimed to have killed 30 Russian servicemen and damaged military equipment in an air attack on Saky air base in Crimea. Ukrainian Stryker and Marder infantry fighting vehicles were reportedly seen on the Surovikin Line near Verbove for the first time, indicating that the main Russian line of defence had been breached.

Russia claimed to have shot down 19 Ukrainian drones over Crimea and in Kursk, Belgorod and Oryol Oblasts.

Sweden delivered ten Stridsvagn 122 tanks to Ukraine, while Germany delivered 17 SatCom terminals, an antenna hub station, four 8x8 HX81 truck tractor trains, four semi-trailers, 12 Zetros trucks, and spare parts for WISENT 1 mine clearing tanks as part of a military aid package to Ukraine. The United States pledged another military aid package to Ukraine worth $325 million that would include air defense and cluster munitions.

Ukraine reached an agreement with Slovakia for a grain licensing system that would see the dropping of Kyiv's lawsuit against the country over its ban on grain imports and the end of Slovak bans on Ukrainian agricultural products.

=== 22 September ===
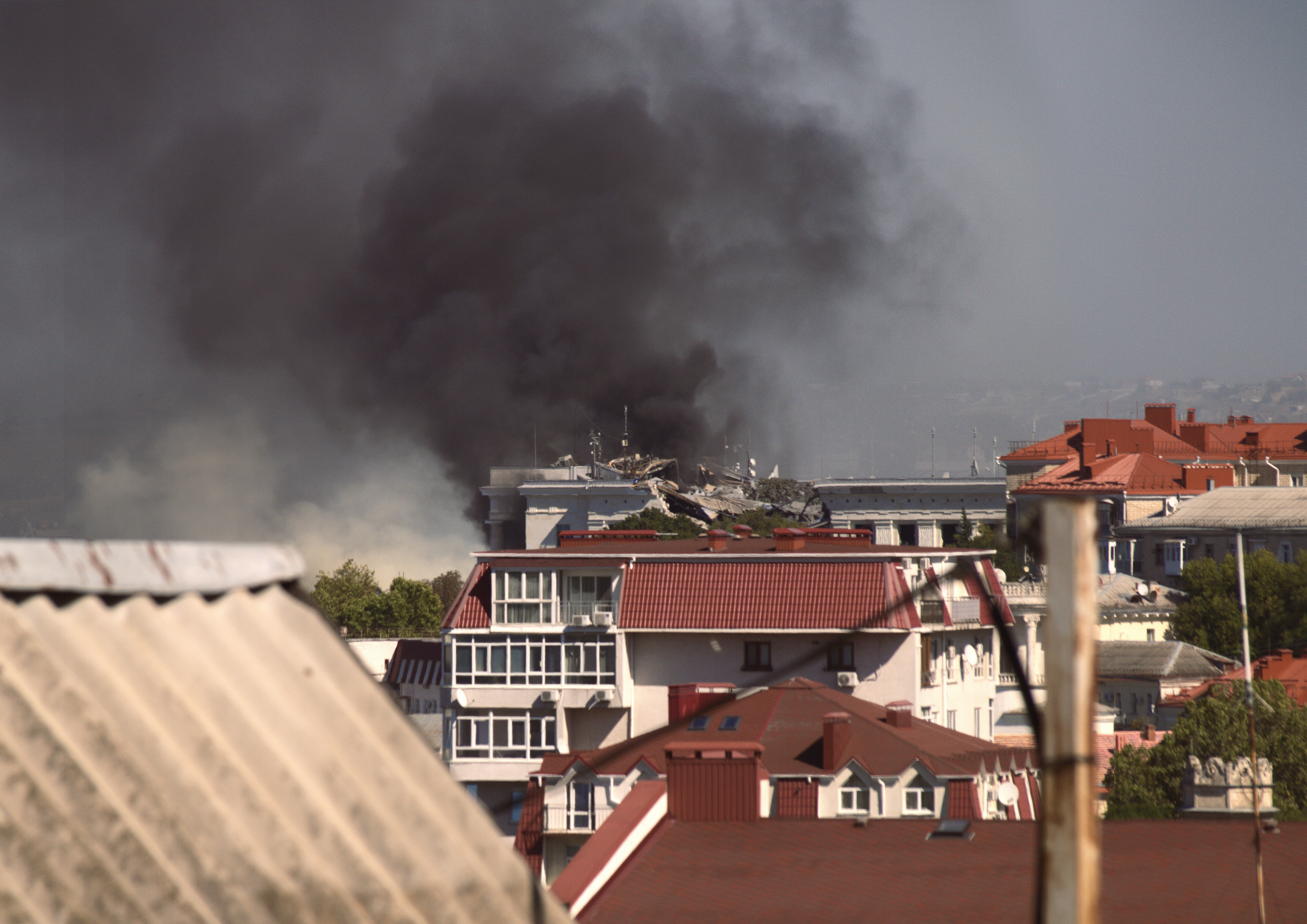
Headquarters of Russian Black Sea Fleet in Sevastopol after the strike

The headquarters of the Russian Black Sea Fleet in Sevastopol was reportedly struck and destroyed by a Ukrainian missile. One serviceman was reported missing by Russian authorities, while Ukrainian military officials claimed 34 officers, including fleet commander Admiral Viktor Sokolov, were killed and 105 servicemen injured, including two generals and "the top management of the fleet". However, Russia released a video appearing to show Sokolov alive on 26 September. Ukrainian sources said that Storm Shadow missiles were used, Russian sources claimed that seven missiles, including one Neptune missile, were used, with air defences shooting down five missiles. Russian officials also reported a "large-scale cyberattack" in occupied Crimea.

One person was killed and 55 others were injured in a Russian missile attack on Kremenchuk. Another person was killed by shelling in Kherson.

Ukraine and the United States announced a program to manufacture "air defence systems" in Ukraine.

During President Zelenskyy's visit to Ottawa, Prime Minister Justin Trudeau pledged 650 million Canadian dollars ($480 million) in military aid for Ukraine that included 50 armored vehicles and training on F-16 fighter jets. The Canadian government also imposed sanctions on 63 Russian individuals and entities for their role in the invasion and the deportation of Ukrainian children. Among those sanctioned were Russian Labour Minister Anton Kotyakov, advisor to the Commissioner for Children's' Rights Alexey Petrov, the Moscow State Institute of International Relations and its director Anatoly Torkunov, the Higher School of Economics, the publications Vzglyad and Komsomolskaya Pravda, and several youth organizations.

=== 23 September ===
The Russian-appointed governor of Sevastopol, Mikhail Razvozhayev, claimed that another missile attack on the city occurred, with debris landing near the pier. Explosions were also reported in Vilne, in northern Crimea. The Ukrainians claimed that nine people were killed and 16 others were wounded in the strike.

Three people were killed in separate Russian attacks in Kherson, Donetsk and Sumy Oblasts.

=== 24 September ===
Two people were killed in Russian airstrikes on Kherson Oblast.

In Russia, the governor of Kursk Oblast claimed that a government building was damaged by a Ukrainian drone in Kursk city. Ukrainian military intelligence claimed that a drone strike on the Khalino air field in the same region killed or wounded the commander and other officers of the Russian 14th Guards Fighter Aviation Regiment. Another drone was reportedly intercepted over Bryansk Oblast.

=== 25 September ===
Russia launched an overnight air attack on Odesa, damaging port infrastructure and a disused hotel and killing two people in a strike on a grain warehouse. Several buildings in the historic centre, including the Vorontsov Palace and eight buildings on Prymorskyi Boulevard, where also damaged, while missile debris was later found in Chițcani, across the border in the breakaway Moldovan region of Transnistria. Though similar cases had happened before in government-controlled regions of Moldova, this was the first time it happened in Transnistria. Three people were killed in a separate airstrike in Beryslav, Kherson Oblast, while three others were killed by an artillery strike in Kherson city.

Another air attack was reported in Sevastopol, with a missile reportedly shot down over Belbek airbase. A Russian ammunition dump in Sorokyne, Luhansk Oblast, was destroyed in a suspected Ukrainian attack.

President Zelenskyy announced the arrival of the first batch out of a total of 31 M1 Abrams tanks promised by the United States to Ukraine, without specifying its number, although Politico reported the number to be ten. More tanks were expected to be sent "during the fall."

The Russian Interior Ministry put the Chairman of the International Criminal Court Piotr Hofmański, his deputy Luz del Carmen Ibáñez Carranza, and Judge Bertram Schmitt, on its list of wanted persons in response to the ICC's arrest warrant against President Vladimir Putin and children's rights commissioner Maria Lvova-Belova.

The United States announced sanctions against 16 Russian and Chinese companies for supplying drone technology components to Russia.

=== 26 September ===
Russia launched an overnight drone attack on Izmail, injuring two people and damaging port infrastructure. One person was killed in a separate attack in Zaporizhzhia Oblast.

Russia filed an application to rejoin the United Nations Human Rights Council after it was expelled in April 2022 for invading Ukraine.

The SBU arrested a priest of the Ukrainian Orthodox Church (Moscow Patriarchate) in Kherson Oblast for hiding, possessing and attempting to sell two weapons caches left behind by retreating Russian forces in 2022.

=== 27 September ===
Two people were killed by Russian shelling in Kherson and Donetsk Oblasts.

The Ukrainian military reported that around 500 Wagner Group fighters returned to fight in Donetsk Oblast as part of the group's redeployment in Ukraine for the first time since its failed rebellion against the Russian military establishment in June.

The SBU arrested two residents of Kyiv on suspicion of passing information to Russian intelligence to use in airstrikes against the capital.

Ukraine announced that it would boycott UEFA football matches involving Russian teams after the body decided to lift the ban on Russian youth teams that had been imposed following the invasion. Poland, Latvia, Lithuania, England, Northern Ireland, Denmark, and Sweden also announced that it would join Ukraine in its boycott.

Dutch defence minister Kajsa Ollongren said that F-16s would arrive in Ukraine in 2024, with training of pilots and ground crew taking approximately 6–8 months. The Bulgarian parliament approved the delivery of unserviceable S-300 missiles to Ukraine.

Ukraine relocated the production of an unspecified missile system to another country due to ongoing Russian attacks on its plant.

=== 28 September ===
Three people were killed by Russian shelling in Kherson, while three others were killed in separate attacks in Donetsk Oblast.

Russia claimed to have repelled an attack by a Ukrainian sabotage group in border areas of Belgorod Oblast.

A massive Distributed Denial-of-Service (DDoS) attack struck the Russian airline booking system Leonardo, preventing users from accessing booking services and online and airport check-ins and causing flight delays. Ukrainian Digital Transformation Minister Mykhailo Fedorov later confirmed that Ukrainian hackers were responsible for the cyberattack.

The German Federal Cartel Office approved a joint venture between Rheinmetall and the Ukrainian Defense Industry to open a maintenance facility for military vehicles in Kyiv.

The EU extended the temporary protection status it granted to Ukrainian refugees to 2025.

=== 29 September ===
A Russian S-300 missile reportedly shot down a Russian Su-35 fighter jet over Tokmak, killing the pilot.

Russian officials claimed that Ukrainian drones dropped explosives on an electrical substation in the village of Belaya in Kursk Oblast, cutting power to five settlements. A dozen other drones were reportedly shot down over Belgorod, Kursk and Kaluga Oblasts. A radar station near Giryi, Kursk Oblast was reportedly destroyed by a drone.

Ukrainian war photographer Volodymyr Myroniuk was announced to have been killed while filming in Kurdiumivka on the Donetsk front.

President Putin appointed former Wagner Group commander and retired colonel Andrei Troshev (nom de guerre Sedoi) to oversee volunteer fighter units in Ukraine.

The Russian Defence Ministry announced that it would subject residents of occupied areas of southern and eastern Ukraine to conscription for the first time since their unrecognized annexation by Russia in 2022. The ministry also said that it was expecting to enlist 130,000 personnel across the country in the fall.

Ukrainian National Police recovered an undisclosed number of TOR missiles from a house in Brovary Raion, Kyiv Oblast. The missiles were believed to have been abandoned by Russian forces following their withdrawal from the area in the spring of 2022 and were believed to be worth "about 30 million hryvnias (about $811,000)" each.

The UK imposed sanctions on the Russian Central Election Commission, its secretary Natalya Budarina, and regional commissioner for Kherson Marina Zakharova for staging local elections in occupied areas of Ukraine.

Russia avoided a full ban from the 2024 Paralympics in Paris after the International Paralympic Committee voted 74–65 with 13 abstentions against suspending its membership "for breaches of its constitutional membership obligations." However, Russian athletes were only allowed to compete under a neutral flag. The body also voted against a full ban on participation by Belarus.

Bulgaria imposed a ban on the importation of Ukrainian sunflower products into the country that would last until the end of November 2023.

=== 30 September ===
Ukrainian officials claimed to have shot down thirty out of forty Russian drones. Twenty were aimed at central Ukraine and some "broke through" Ukrainian defences to strike Kalynivka, Vinnytsia Oblast, starting a "powerful fire". Romania also claimed that radar detected an "unauthorised" entry into its airspace towards Galați.

The Ukrainian Navy announced that it had conducted a successful operation to extract two airborne assault operators who were trapped and forced into hiding in Russian-occupied territory for more than one and a half years after being injured. The operation was conducted by the navy's Angels special forces unit, while an airborne assault detachment provided covering fire during the extraction. Ukrainian military intelligence claimed that a Russian soldier it had recruited in July had defected to Ukraine after convincing 11 other Russian soldiers to defect as well.

In Russia, a Ukrainian drone strike on the settlement of Pogar, Bryansk Oblast, reportedly caused a power outage in the area.

President Zelenskyy held a forum for 250 Western arms manufacturers from 30 countries in Kyiv as part of efforts to increase domestic weapons production and manufacture more Western weapons. The Ukrainian Foreign Ministry claimed that 20 agreements between Ukraine and Western companies were signed.

An Estonian volunteer for the International Legion in Ukraine was killed in a drone strike on Lyman, Donetsk Oblast.

== October 2023 ==
=== 1 October ===
One person was killed by shelling in Vovchansk, Kharkiv Oblast.

The Russian-appointed head of Crimea, Sergei Aksyonov, claimed that two warehouses were damaged by debris from intercepted Ukrainian missiles in Dzhankoi.

The ISW, citing Russian milbloggers, reported that Lieutenant General Andrei Sychevoi was relieved from his post as field commander in Bakhmut for conducting "unprepared and unsupported" counterattacks near Andriivka and Klishchiivka.

Several warships of the Russian Black Sea Fleet, including its flagship Admiral Makarov, the frigate Admiral Essen, three submarines, five large landing ships and several small missile cruisers were reportedly evacuated to Novorossiysk, Krasnodar Krai following a series of Ukrainian attacks on naval installations in Crimea.

In Russia, Ukrainian drones reportedly struck Adler airbase in Sochi and an aircraft factory operated by the state-run Tactical Missile Armament corporation in Smolensk. Three people were reportedly wounded by Ukrainian shelling at a market in Shebekino, Belgorod Oblast.

=== 2 October ===
A police officer was killed by Russian shelling of a transport company in Kherson.

Foreign ministers of all 27 member states of the EU gathered in Kyiv for the first such meeting of its kind outside the bloc's territory.

Germany delivered an aid package to Ukraine that included over 32,000 rounds of 40-mm ammunition, dozens of all-terrain and border protection vehicles, radio equipment for Leopard tanks, almost 100 Satcom terminals, over 1,000 infusion kits, a Beaver bridge-laying tank, and two Wisent 1 mine-clearing tanks.

=== 3 October ===
One person was killed by a Russian airstrike in the Antonivka suburb of Kherson.

President Zelenskyy visited Ukrainian military positions on the Kupiansk-Lyman front in Kharkiv Oblast.

In Russia, a drone was reportedly intercepted over Bryansk Oblast, while Russia accused Ukraine of hitting several homes in Klimovo with cluster munitions.

The Russian Investigative Committee charged four Ukrainian military officials with terrorism, namely military intelligence chief Kyrylo Budanov, Air Force Commander Mykola Oleshchuk, Navy Commander Oleksiy Neizhpapa, and commander of the 383rd separate regiment of remotely controlled aircraft, Serhii Burdeniuk, for their role in attacks on Russian and Crimean soil blamed on Ukraine.

The NACP placed the China Petrochemical Corporation (Sinopec), the China National Offshore Oil Corporation (CNOOC), and the China National Petroleum Corporation (CNPC) on its list of international sponsors of the war in Ukraine for continuing to invest in Russian energy projects and buying Russian oil and gas.

The Pentagon announced that it was ready to send a small number of cluster munition-armed ATACMS with a range of "300 kilometers (190 miles)" to Ukraine pending approval by President Joe Biden.

=== 4 October ===
Ukrainian military intelligence announced that special forces had landed in Crimea and engaged in combat with Russian forces, resulting in losses on both sides before retreating as part of a scheduled operation.

Russia claimed to have shot down 31 drones during an overnight Ukrainian drone attack on its western border regions. An S-400 Triumph air defense system near Belgorod was reportedly hit by SBU drones.

The SBU arrested three people, including a Russian citizen, on suspicion of spying on the Ukrainian military and aiding airstrikes on behalf of Russian military intelligence in Kharkiv and Zhytomyr Oblasts.

Lithuania opened a corridor for Ukrainian grain to reach Baltic ports, with Ukrainian Agriculture Minister Mykola Solskyi adding that Ukrainian agricultural exports heading for Klaipėda would be checked directly at the port instead of at the Polish border to speed up movement.

A court in Moscow sentenced journalist Marina Ovsyannikova in absentia to eight-and-a-half years in a penal colony and imposed a ban on her engaging in electronic activities for four years for allegedly discrediting the Russian military in relation to her on-air criticism of the war on the main evening news program Vremya in 2022.

Ukraine announced plans to build the world's first underground school in Kharkiv due to its proximity from the Russian border.

US officials announced that "thousands" of Iranian-made weapons and 1.1 million 7.62 mm rounds seized by the US Central Command were to be transferred to Ukraine.

=== 5 October ===
Removal of bodies in Hroza

59 people, including a six-year-old child, were killed and six others were injured after a store and a café hosting a wake were struck by a suspected Russian Iskander missile in the village of Hroza, Kharkiv Oblast, 30 kilometers west of Kupiansk. Three people were killed in separate attacks in Kherson and Sumy Oblast.

In Russia, one person was reportedly injured by a Ukrainian cluster munitions attack in Rylsk, Kursk Oblast, while power outages were reported in the region following drone strikes on infrastructure facilities in three districts.

CBS, citing US officials, reported that North Korea had begun delivering artillery to Russia for its war effort in Ukraine.

The NGO Save Ukraine said it had rescued 19 Ukrainian children from Russian-occupied territories.

During the third European Political Community summit in Granada, Spain, which president Volodymyr Zelenskyy attended, Spain pledged six Hawk air defense systems to Ukraine, while German Chancellor Olaf Scholz pledged another Patriot air defense system. The United Kingdom also pledged a humanitarian aid package that included a loan guarantee of 500 million pounds ($600 million) disbursed through the World Bank to ensure winter support payments to three million households, $41 million to the United Nations and charities supplying Ukrainians with shelter and warm winter clothing, and $12 million to sustain electricity supplies.

=== 6 October ===
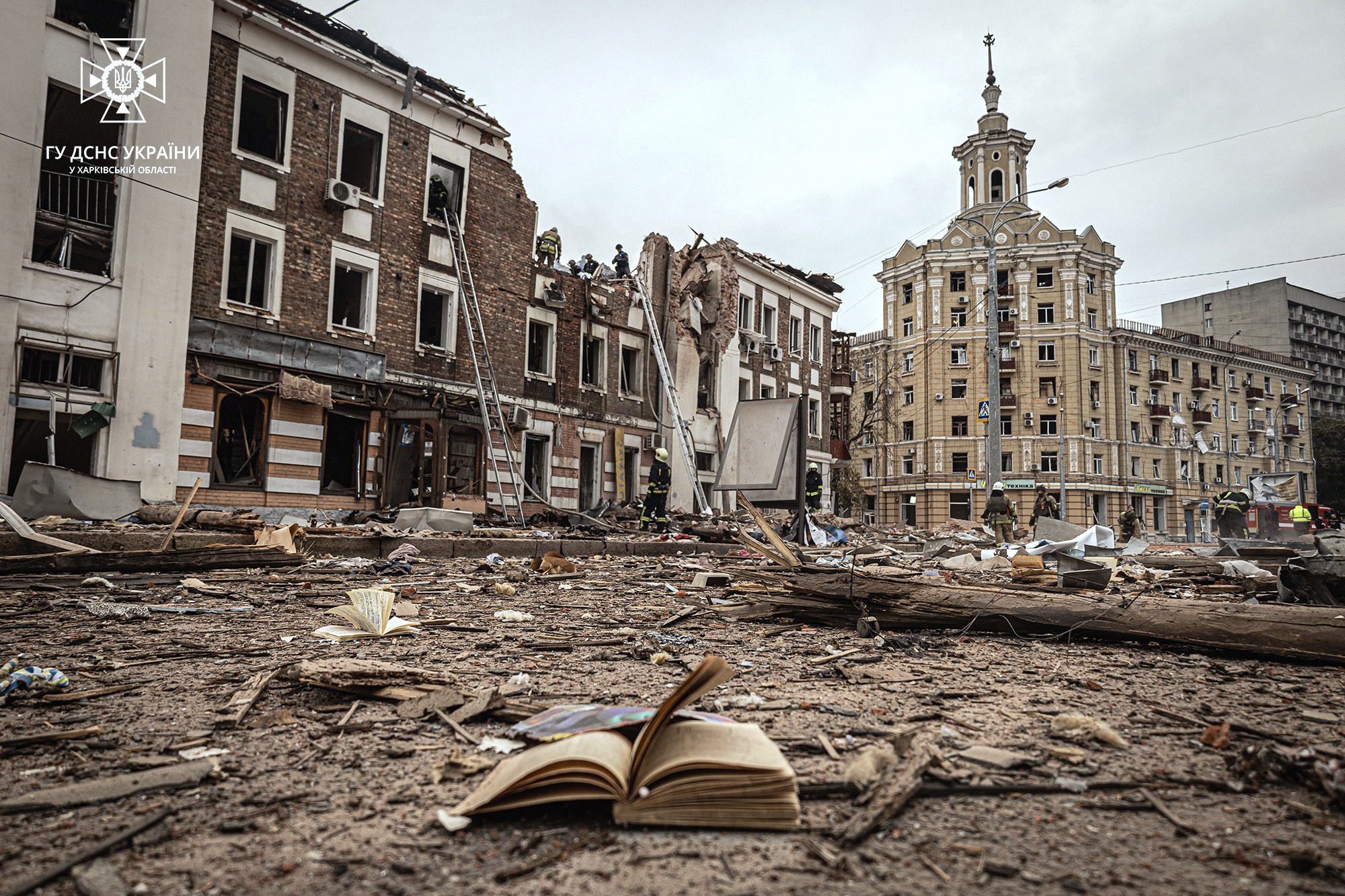
Destruction in the center of Kharkiv

Two people, including a ten-year-old child, were killed and 23 others were injured in a Russian missile strike on an apartment in Kharkiv. A separate drone attack on port infrastructure in Odesa Oblast damaged nine trucks and a granary. The Ukrainian Air Force claimed to have shot down 25 of 33 drones launched.

A Russian-born Ukrainian citizen and resident of Ternopil and two military recruits were reportedly detained and tortured by personnel from the local military enlistment office, leading to charges against a commander of the office's security department and another staffer.

Sweden pledged a 2.2-billion-kronor ($199.8 million) military aid package to Ukraine that would include artillery ammunition, spare parts, infantry equipment, and communications equipment.

The US Commerce Department added 42 Chinese companies and seven other firms from other countries to its export control list for providing logistical support to the Russian military and defence industry.

The Supreme Court of Russian-occupied Crimea sentenced Ukrainian activist Serhiy Tsygipa, who was abducted from Kherson Oblast in 2022, to 13 years in prison for alleged "espionage" on behalf of Ukrainian authorities.

=== 7 October ===
One person was killed in a Russian cluster munitions attack in Bilenke, Zaporizhzhia Oblast.

Vladimir Malov, the executive secretary of the United Russia party in Nova Kakhovka, was killed by a car bomb.

In Crimea, missile attacks were reported in Dzhankoi, Yevpatoriya and Krasnoperekopsk.

In Russia, one person was reportedly killed by Ukrainian shelling in Urazovo, Belgorod Oblast, while the Russian Defence Ministry claimed to have destroyed three Tochka-U missiles over the region and thwarted a drone attack on Moscow.

=== 8 October ===
Two people were killed by Russian attacks in Kharkiv and Kherson Oblasts.

Finnish president Sauli Niinistö and prime minister Petteri Orpo stated that the gas pipeline Balticconnector and an adjacent communications cable, connecting Finland and Estonia, failed due to possible sabotage, prompting an investigation. Undersea telecommunications cables between Sweden and Estonia were damaged by "external force or tampering", according to Carl-Oskar Bohlin, Sweden's minister for civil defence. Bohlin said the damage was related to the damage to the gas pipeline and cables between Finland and Estonia. In response, NATO increased patrols in the Baltic Sea.

=== 9 October ===
President Zelenskyy dismissed Major General Ihor Tantsyura from his position as commander of Ukraine's Territorial Defense Forces and replaced him with Major General Anatoliy Barhylevych.

Hungary resumed imports of Ukrainian sugar following an amendment to its ban on Ukrainian agricultural products.

Two days after the October 7 attacks, Ukraine intelligence accused Russia of supplying Hamas with western-made Ukrainian weapons seized from battlefields in an attempt to discredit Ukraine and distract Western media attention.

=== 10 October ===
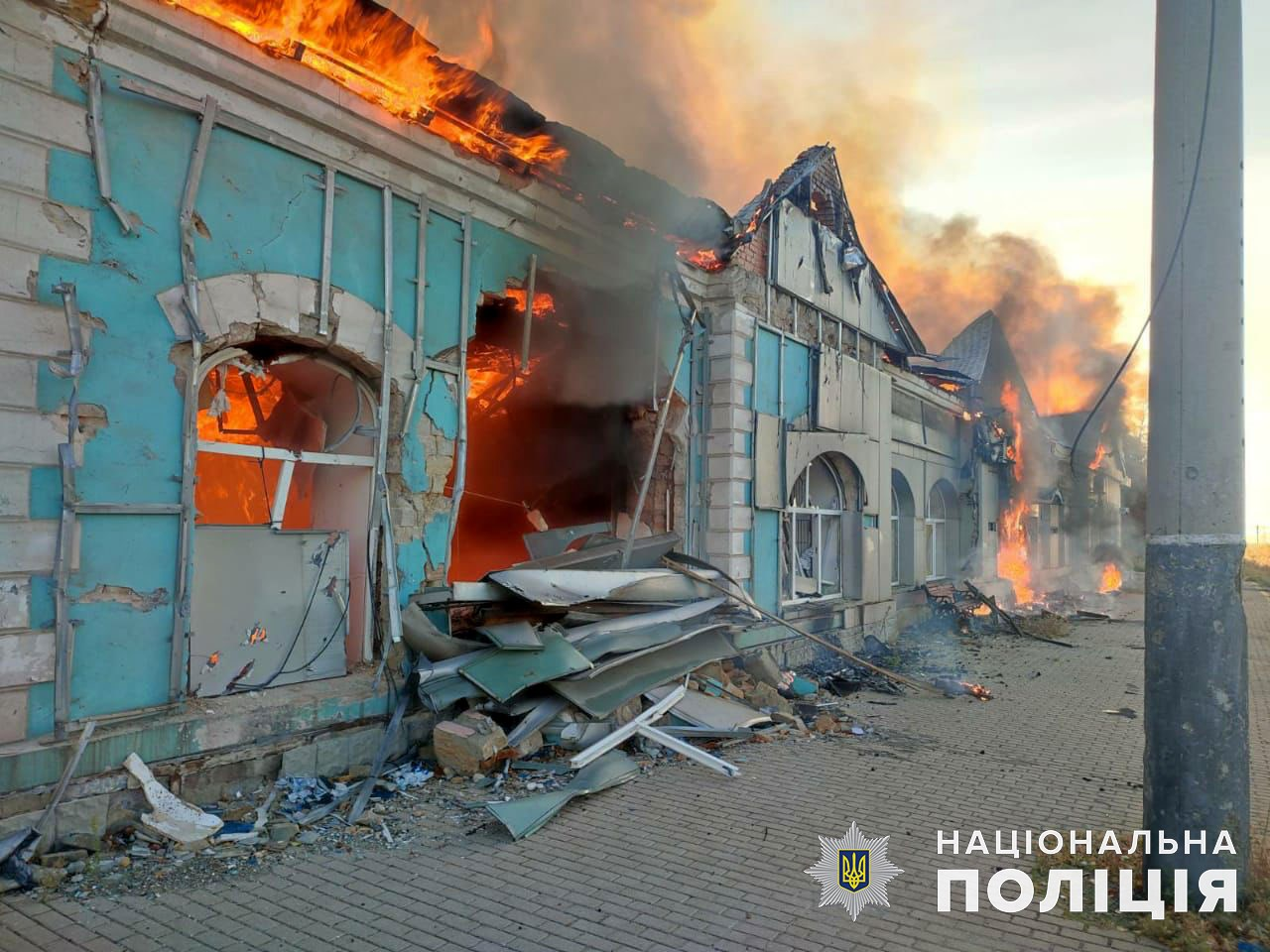
Train station in Ocheretyne (Donetsk Oblast) after Russian strike on 10 October

A 13-year-old child was killed by Russian shelling in Uhroidy, Sumy Oblast.

Russia intensified its offensive to encircle Avdiivka.

In Russia, a couple was reportedly killed by Ukrainian shelling in Popovka, Belgorod Oblast. A conscript was killed while five other soldiers were injured in a separate attack in Gudovka, Bryansk Oblast.

Russia's bid to rejoin the UN Human Rights Council was rejected, with 83, or 43%, of 193 UN members states voting in favor of Russian membership.

Rheinmetall pledged 150,000 artillery shells to Ukraine.

UEFA reversed its decision to allow Russian youth teams to play in the Under-17 European Championship.

=== 11 October ===
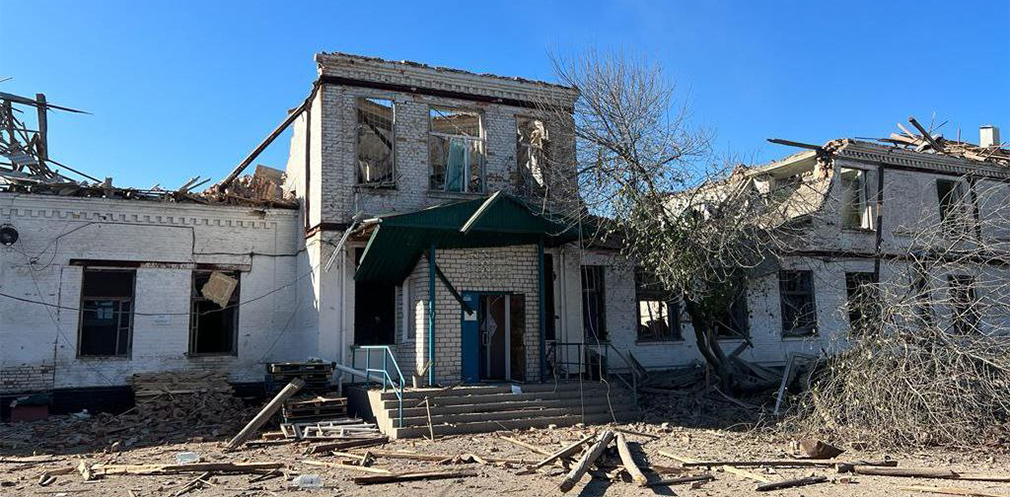
The shelled school in Nikopol

Four people were killed and two more injured by Russian shelling of a high school in Nikopol. Another person was killed in a separate attack in Avdiivka.

In Russia, two drones were reportedly shot down over Bryansk Oblast.

A suspected saboteur working for Russian military intelligence in Kharkiv was arrested after he was reportedly caught planting explosives at a gas station.

The UK Defense Ministry announced a £100 million ($122 million) military aid package to Ukraine that included anti-minefield equipment and the MSI-DS Terrahawk Paladin air-defense system. The Pentagon also pledged a $200 million military aid package to Ukraine that included AIM-9 munitions, artillery and rocket ammunition, precision aerial munitions, anti-tank weapons, and anti-drone equipment.

=== 12 October ===
Five people, including a child, were killed by Russian shelling in Donetsk and Kherson Oblasts.

The ISW assessed that Russian forces had taken 4.5 square kilometers of territory around Avdiivka since the start of its offensive on 10 October.

The Russian project 22160 patrol ship Pavel Derzhavin and a Buyan-class corvette were reportedly damaged in a Ukrainian naval drone attack in the Black Sea. Ukrainian forces intercepted and repelled a Russian sabotage group in Sumy Oblast.

In Russia, two people were reportedly killed in a house fire caused by falling drone debris in Belgorod Oblast.

The Czech Republic and Denmark jointly pledged a military aid package to Ukraine that would include 50 infantry fighting vehicles and tanks, 2,500 pistols, 7,000 rifles, 500 light machine guns, 500 sniper rifles, electronic warfare and surveillance equipment, and artillery shells.

President Putin made his first international visit following the ICC's issuance of an arrest warrant against him, arriving in Kyrgyzstan, which is not a member of the court, to attend the Commonwealth of Independent States summit.

The International Olympic Committee suspended the Russian Olympic Committee until further notice after the latter recognized Olympic councils from occupied Ukrainian regions unilaterally annexed by Russia in 2022.

=== 13 October ===
One person was killed and 23 others were injured in a Russian missile attack in Pokrovsk, Donetsk Oblast, while another was killed in a drone strike in Kherson Oblast.

A train carrying ammunition and fuel for the Russian military as well as looted items was reportedly blown up by Ukrainian partisans in Melitopol.

The White House said that North Korea had delivered more than 1,000 containers of military equipment and munitions for the Russian war effort in Ukraine.

A Ukrainian woman in Kirovohrad Oblast was convicted and sentenced to life imprisonment for treason for providing the Russian military with photographs of strategic sites, such as oil refineries and defense plants, in Ukraine.

French police opened an investigation into the suspected poisoning of Russian journalist and former Kremlin propagandist Marina Ovsyannikova, who had previously protested the Russian invasion of Ukraine, after she suddenly collapsed outside her apartment. In early October, she was sentenced in absentia to eight and a half years in prison by a Moscow court for "disseminating false information" about the Russian army.

=== 14 October ===
Three people, including an 11-year-old child, were killed in Russian attacks on Donetsk and Kherson Oblasts.

A massive fire broke out at a gas pipeline in Kuteinykove, occupied Donetsk Oblast.

In Russia, two drones were reportedly shot down over the coast of Sochi.

According to Boeing, GLSDB will be delivered to Ukraine by winter.

=== 15 October ===
Two people were killed in a Russian airstrike in Druzhelyubivka, Kharkiv Oblast. Another two people were killed in Russian attacks on Avdiivka, Donetsk Oblast, while two others were killed in shelling of Beryslav, Kherson Oblast. Two airstrikes on infrastructure facilities in Kherson resulted in electricity and water outages in the city.

Russia claimed to have shot down 27 drones over Kursk and Belgorod Oblasts. An attack on an energy facility in Krasnaya Yaruga, Belgorod Oblast, caused blackouts in the area.

Four Ukrainian children deported to Russia were returned to their families as part of an agreement brokered by Qatar.

=== 16 October ===
The ISW assessed that Russian forces had advanced three kilometers south of Avdiivka.

Ukrainian Colonel General Oleksandr Syrskyi said that the 25th Separate Airborne Brigade had shot down an Mi-8 without supplying the location.

In Russia, three drones were reportedly shot down over Belgorod Oblast.

The US military confirmed the arrival in Ukraine of all 31 Abrams tanks it had promised to the latter.

=== 17 October ===
Ukraine claimed it had killed and wounded dozens of Russian soldiers and destroyed between nine and 21 helicopters, an air defense system, and an ammunition dump in airstrikes in Berdiansk and Luhansk. Analysts later reported 21 helicopters had been destroyed. President Zelenskyy confirmed that 160-kilometer (99-mile) range ATACMS rockets were used in the attacks, the first time they were used in the conflict since their arrival from the US a few days earlier.Forbes reported that three ATACMS were fired during the attack.

The Ukrainian military said it had advanced by a kilometer west of Verbove.

=== 18 October ===
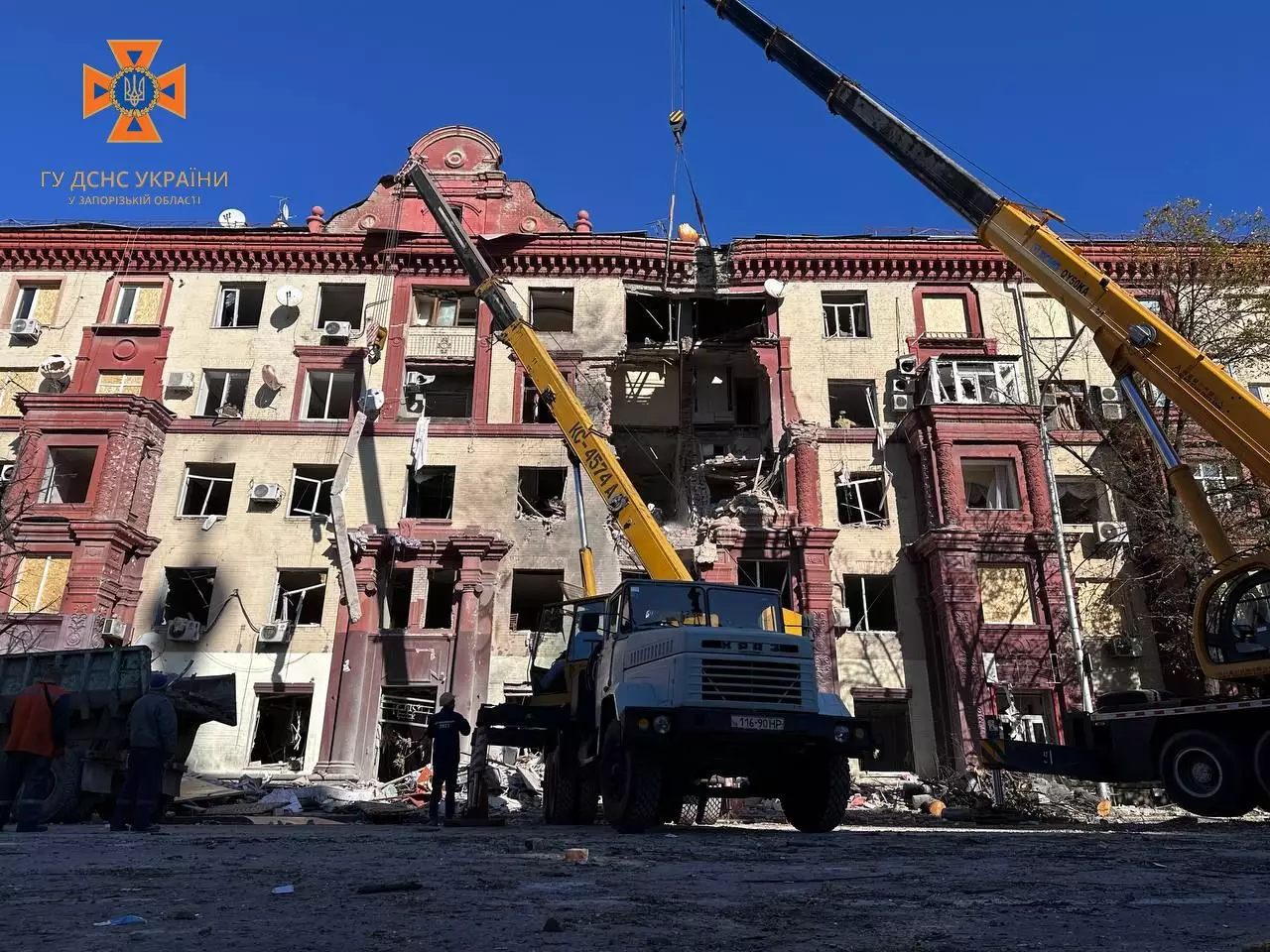
Residential building in Zaporizhzhia after the attack

Five people were killed and five others were injured in a Russian missile attack on a residential building in Zaporizhzhia, while another was killed in a separate attack in Dnipro. Two people were killed in a missile attack in Stepove, Mykolaiv Oblast, while one person was killed in an airstrike in Kherson Oblast.

Two Ukrainian missiles were reportedly shot down over Crimea, with an explosion being reported in the Sakharnaya Golovka area of Sevastopol.

Russia said it had shot down 28 drones over Kursk and Belgorod Oblasts as well as over the Black Sea. A military camp near the Khalino airbase in Kursk was reportedly struck by drones from the SBU.

=== 19 October ===
Ukrainian forces reportedly landed on the east bank of the Dnipro river in Kherson Oblast, advancing north of Pishchanivka and into Poima, around four kilometers from the shore, and prompting Russian airstrikes on Pishchanivka. One person was killed in a Russian attack in Bila Hora, Donetsk Oblast.

Russia claimed to have intercepted three Royal Air Force aircraft over the Black Sea.

Israeli officials told Axios that tens of thousands of 155 mm artillery shells that were to be delivered by the US Defense Department for Ukraine were to be diverted instead to Israel to fight Hamas militants. According to US officials, the shells were already stockpiled in Israel and the US would transfer them to Ukraine if Israel gave permission.

Ukraine announced a campaign to hire over 2,000 judges to tackle multiple issues such as corruption allegations, war crimes investigations and delays in background checks.

US President Joe Biden delivered a national address linking the war in Ukraine with the war in Israel, saying "We cannot and will not let terrorists like Hamas and tyrants like Putin win." He also asked Congress for $100 billion for Israel, Ukraine, Taiwan and US–Mexico border security.

Croatia announced that it would send its entire fleet of Mi-8 helicopters to Ukraine.

US journalist for Radio Free Europe/Radio Liberty Alsu Kurmasheva was detained in Russia, charged with failure to register as a foreign agent. Kurmasheva was in Russia for a "family emergency".

=== 20 October ===
One person was killed in a Russian airstrike in Kherson Oblast. Another person was killed and another hospitalized in a separate attack on residences in Kryvyi Rih.

The ISW assessed that Ukrainian forces had reached the northeastern part of the village of Krynky, two kilometers southeast of the Dnipro River in Russian-occupied Kherson Oblast.

The exiled mayor of Melitopol claimed that Ukrainian partisans detonated a car bomb in the Aviamistechko district that targeted Russian looters.

Russian authorities started a military camp in occupied territories to train teenagers aged 14 to 17 years in "particular military occupational specialties" that Russian forces lack. Occupation authorities intend to involve every 1 in 10 children in the Young Army Cadets National Movement.

The Russian Aerospace Forces reinforced Belbek Airport in Crimea with at least four MiG-31 and some ten Su-27 and Su-30 fighter jets.

Ukraine claimed that the Russian Orthodox Church had set up a private military company using donations for funding and utilizing a cathedral for training.

In Moscow, OMON riot police detained worshippers at a mosque for forced enlistment. Authorities seized the worshippers' passports and had them sign military enlistment contracts without the presence of lawyers.

=== 21 October ===
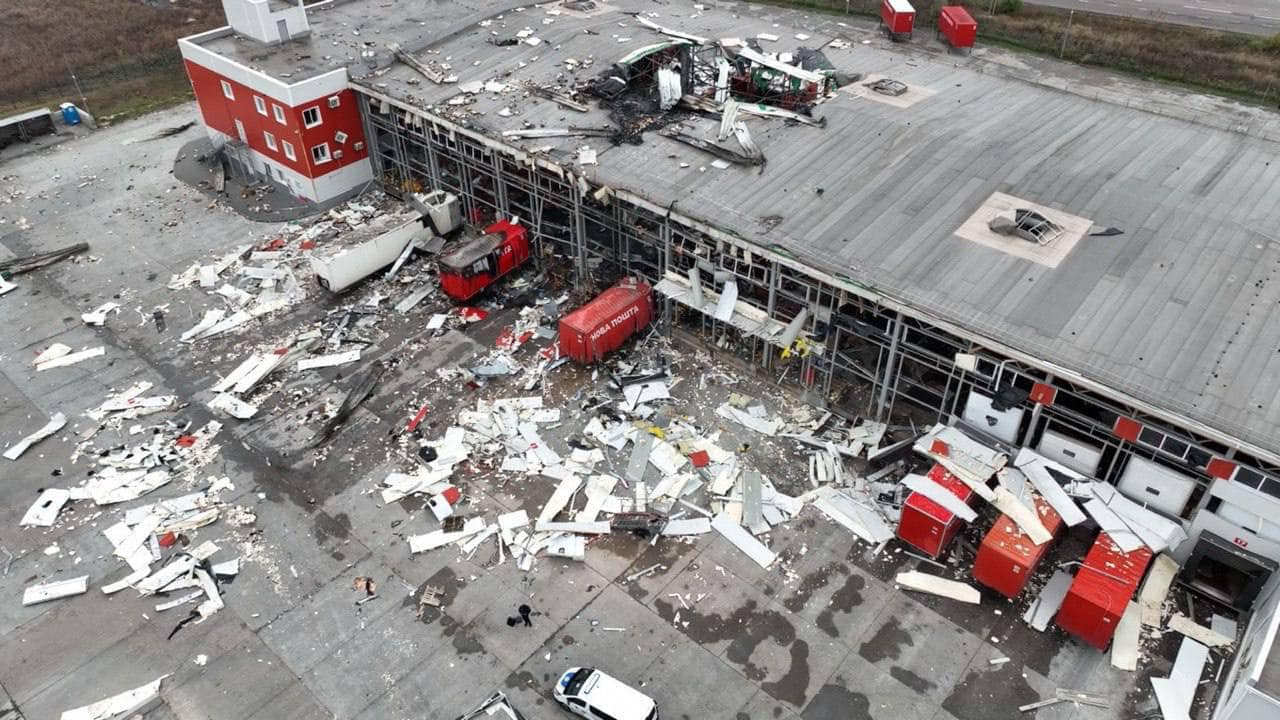
Postal distribution centre at Novyi Korotych after the strike

Eight postal workers were killed and 17 others were injured in a Russian missile attack on the privately owned Nova Poshta sorting office at Novyi Korotych, Kharkiv Oblast.

The United Nations found further evidence of war crimes committed by Russian forces during an investigation in Kherson and Zaporizhzhia Oblasts. It cited evidence for "indiscriminate attacks," as well as "war crimes of wilful killing, torture, rape and other sexual violence, and the deportation of children to the Russian Federation."

=== 22 October ===
Two people were killed in Russian attacks in Donetsk Oblast. A power plant operated by Ukraine's largest private energy company DTEK sustained significant damage in a separate attack.

In Crimea, explosions were reported in Sevastopol Bay. Russia claimed to have shot down three missiles over Kherson Oblast.

Ukraine claimed to have shot down five Russian Su-25s over the last ten days over Donetsk Oblast.

=== 23 October ===
Two people were killed by Russian shelling in Kherson Oblast. In Kherson city, transportation and food factories were hit. Ukraine's air defense systems destroyed six Russian drones and a cruise missile. Vladimir Saldo, the Russian-installed governor of Kherson Oblast, said Russia shot down three Ukrainian missiles heading for Crimea.

Ukrainian military intelligence claimed that four FSB agents were "liquidated" by partisans in a car bombing in Berdiansk.

The SBU arrested three residents of Kherson on suspicion of aiding Russian airstrikes on the city.

Ukrainian authorities ordered the mandatory evacuation of children and their parents or guardians from eight settlements in Donetsk Oblast and 23 settlements in Kherson Oblast due to heavy fighting.

The Washington Post reported that the SBU carried out dozens of assassinations in Russia since the invasion began, including the bomb attack on journalist Darya Dugina, which they had previously denied.

Turkish President Recep Tayyip Erdoğan submitted a bill to parliament for the ratification of Sweden's NATO membership.

Russian OMON police raided a Moscow mosque during Friday prayers, according to reports, and took those arrested to a military enlistment office. It was also alleged that they seized the worshippers' passports, and without legal advice, forced them to sign military contracts.

=== 24 October ===
Two people were killed by Russian shelling in Podoly, Kharkiv Oblast, another four in the region were injured. Four people, including a 12-year-old, were injured by Russian attacks in Kherson Oblast.

Russia claimed to have destroyed three Ukrainian naval drones following explosions in Sevastopol.

The Russian Federal Security Service accused the SBU of attempting to poison some 77 pilots of the Armavir Higher Military Aviation School for Pilots in Krasnodar Krai during a reunion by sending a poisoned cake and whiskey. The deliveryman, who came from occupied Melitopol, was sentenced to 15 days' imprisonment for hooliganism.

Germany announced a new military aid package for Ukraine valued at $1.4 billion that would include three Gepard anti-aircraft cannon systems, 40 RQ-35 and Vector reconnaissance drones, a Biber assault bridge system, three HX81 tank recovery vehicles, three tank recovery trailers, 13 border patrol vehicles, and 3,872 155 mm smoke shells.

=== 25 October ===
Sixteen people were injured in an overnight Russian drone attack on Slavuta, Khmelnytskyi Oblast. Twenty people were injured in a Russian strike employing Iranian Shahed drones in Netishyn, likely targeting the Khmelnytskyi Nuclear Power Plant. One person was killed in a Russian airstrike in Beryslav.

The Australian government announced a $20 million (AUD) aid package for the Ukrainian military that would include 3D printers, de-mining equipment, x-ray machines and anti-drone systems.

The Russian Federation Council unanimously approved a bill to revoke the ratification of the Comprehensive Nuclear-Test-Ban Treaty.

=== 26 October ===
Two people, including a 16-year-old, were killed by Russian shelling in Sumy and Kherson Oblasts.

Russia claimed that three drones tried to attack the Kursk Nuclear Power Plant. The FSB claimed to have killed a man working for Ukrainian intelligence in Tver who was planning to attack a military enlistment office following a shootout.

Romania installed an anti-drone system at the Danube Delta region bordering Ukraine following incidents of Russian drone debris landing on its territory during airstrikes.

Denmark pledged a military aid package to Ukraine worth 3.7 billion kroner ($520 million) that would include T-72EA tanks, BMP-2 infantry fighting vehicles, artillery shells, drones, small arms, and engineering and recovery vehicles. The US also pledged a military aid package worth around $150 million that would include munitions for NASAMS and HIMARS munitions, small arms, AIM-9M and Stinger missiles, Javelin anti-armor systems, night vision devices, and cold weather gear.

The new Slovak Prime Minister Robert Fico officially announced that his country would provide no further military aid to Ukraine and oppose further sanctions against Russia.

=== 27 October ===
An entire family consisting of nine people, including two children, was killed by Russian soldiers who wanted to seize their home in Volnovakha, occupied Donetsk Oblast. Russia said it had arrested two suspects.

Pro-Russian and former Ukrainian parliamentarian Oleg Tsaryov was shot and wounded near his home in Crimea. Russian officials said he was in hospital under intensive care. The FSB claimed that it had killed a Ukrainian military intelligence agent and arrested two others following a shootout in Zaporizhzhia Oblast.

US intelligence officials claimed that Russian forces were executing soldiers who had refused to follow orders in fighting near Avdiivka; Ukrainian forces claimed that some Russian units had suffered "mutinies".

Germany delivered a military aid package to Ukraine that included an IRIS-T SLM air defense system, IRIS-T SLS missiles, 5,000 155 mm artillery shells, four armored personnel carriers, eight VECTOR reconnaissance drones, a TRML-4D aerial radar, four ground radars, five unmanned surface ships, six border guard vehicles, ammunition for MARS II multiple-launch rocket systems, four tractors with semi-trailers, and 10,000 safety glasses.

The Institute for the Study of War assessed that some 70 Ukrainian prisoners of war had been recruited by Russian forces to fight against Ukraine. Russian state media reported that the Bohdan Khmelnytsky Battalion formed in February 2023 from Ukrainian POWs had joined a Russian military unit and would be deployed to the front after taking an oath.

In a phone call, President Zelenskyy told UK Prime Minister Rishi Sunak that Russian forces had lost at least a brigade's worth of soldiers during fighting near Avdiivka.

The bodies of 50 Ukrainian soldiers killed in action were returned to Ukraine in a cadaver exchange with Russia.

=== 28 October ===
Russia claimed to have destroyed 36 drones over the Black Sea and Crimea following explosions near Chornomorske and Saky.

=== 29 October ===
One person was killed in a Russian attack in Kherson Oblast.

A Russian Su-25 fighter jet was reportedly shot down by the State Border Guard Service of Ukraine near Avdiivka.

In Russia, a fire was reported at the Afipsky oil refinery near Novorossiysk. No damage or casualties were reported. Local media, quoting security officials, claimed the fire was started by a drone. Ukrainian media reported that the attack was organized by the SBU.

The Institute for the Study of War, citing Russian milbloggers, reported that Colonel General Oleg Makarevich was replaced as the commander of Russian forces in Kherson by Colonel General Mikhail Teplinsky.

=== 30 October ===
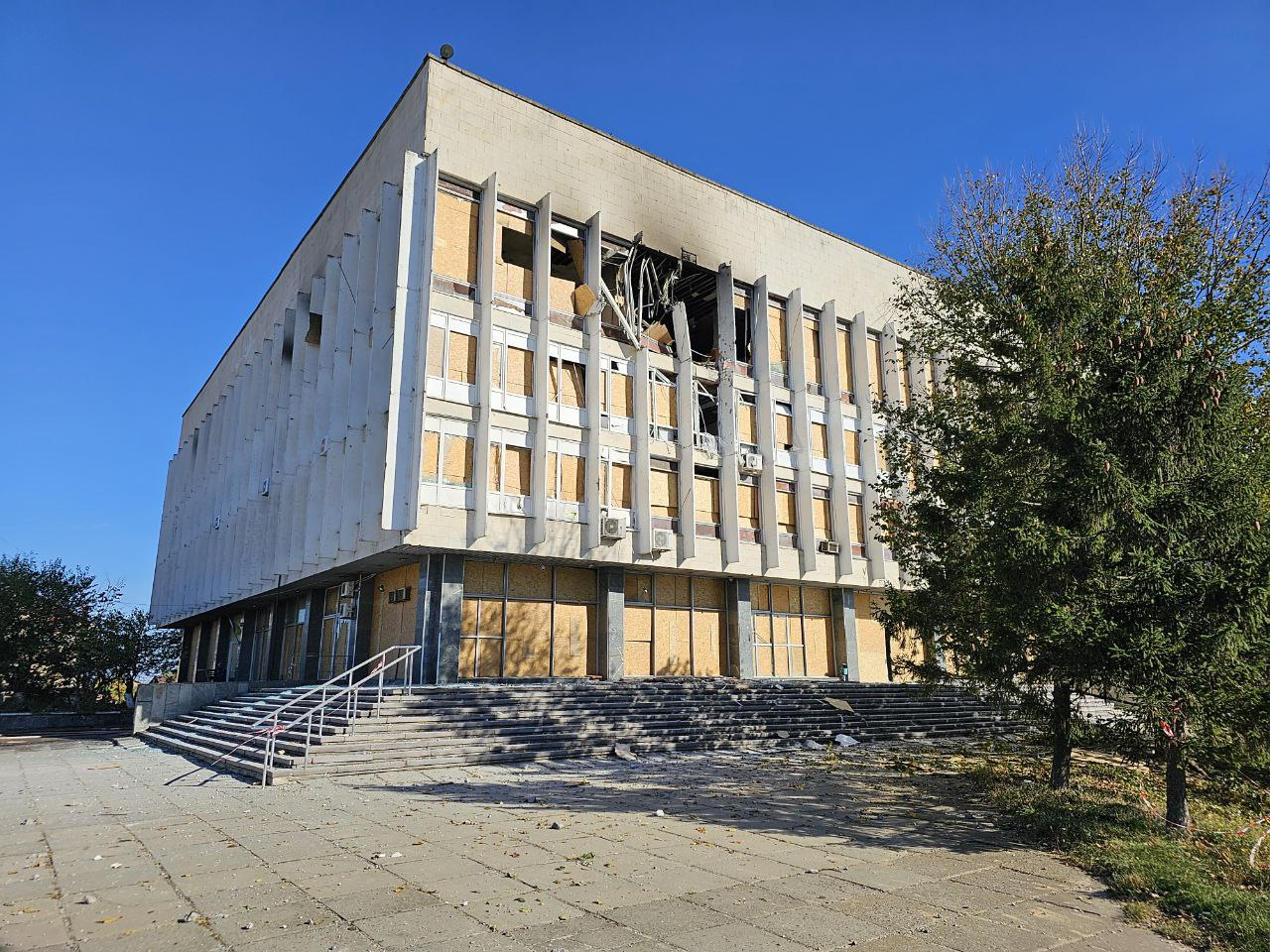
Kherson Oblast Scientific Library after Russian shelling on 30 October

One person was killed by Russian shelling in Kherson.

Ukraine claimed to have destroyed Russian air defence systems in a missile attack on Crimea. Russian milbloggers said that two missiles fell near Olenivka while three naval drones were intercepted near Sevastopol. The attack was believed to have targeted an S-300 missile battery, and injured about 17 Russian personnel. One person was reportedly injured following explosions in Sevastopol and Saky.

The FSB detained a Russian national in Sevastopol for allegedly passing sensitive information to Ukraine.

Latvia pledged 12 drones to the Ukrainian police.

The Russian private military company Redut opened recruitment for women as drone operators and snipers in the invasion of Ukraine.

An apartment owned by the Zelenskyys in Yalta, Crimea was auctioned off by Russian authorities after it was seized.

=== 31 October ===
One person was killed while two others were injured in a Russian attack in Kherson. Two people were killed in separate attacks in Donetsk and Kharkiv Oblasts.

An oil refinery in Kremenchuk was set on fire following a Russian attack.

The White House said that President Biden will veto any Republican funding bill for Israel if aid for Ukraine was excluded.

== November 2023 ==
=== 1 November ===
Five people were killed in separate Russian attacks in Dnipropetrovsk, Kherson and Zaporizhzhia Oblasts.

The Economist published an opinion piece from top Ukrainian commander Valery Zaluzhnyi in which he called the current state of the conflict a "stalemate". In response, the deputy head of President Zelenskyy's office, Igor Zhovkva criticized Zaluzhnyi's for allegedly going too far in disclosing battlefield information to the public.

The Ukrainian State Bureau of Investigation uncovered a massive scheme involving regional military enlistment offices receiving bribes in exchange for helping people evade mobilization. It said that nine recruitment officers were involved in the scheme, which was allegedly organized by the former head of the Kyiv Regional Military Commissariat and was primarily centered in Kyiv Oblast. At least 100 people were suspected to have availed of the scheme after paying between $6,000-10,000 in bribes.

A court in Russian-occupied Donetsk Oblast sentenced three Ukrainian soldiers to 30 years to life imprisonment for alleged war crimes during the Siege of Mariupol.

Switzerland extended the temporary protected status it granted for Ukrainian refugees until March 2025.

Italian Prime Minister Giorgia Meloni spoke to a pair of Russian pranksters posing as African leaders in a thirteen-minute audio clip, during which she admitted that there was a "lot of fatigue" over the war in Ukraine.

=== 2 November ===
Russia claimed to have shot down six drones over the Black Sea and Crimea.

Ukraine sustained its most extensive Russian artillery bombardment of 2023 over the last 24 hours according to Interior Minister Ihor Klymenko, with about 118 settlements shelled in ten regions. Authorities ordered the mandatory evacuation of children and their parents or guardians from 66 settlements in Kupiansk Raion, Kharkiv Oblast citing the "security situation".

South Korean officials said that North Korea had supplied Russia with several types of missiles for use in Ukraine including "short-range ballistic missiles, anti-tank missiles and portable anti-air missiles".

The NACP added Nestle to its International Sponsors of War list for continuing to operate in Russia.

=== 3 November ===
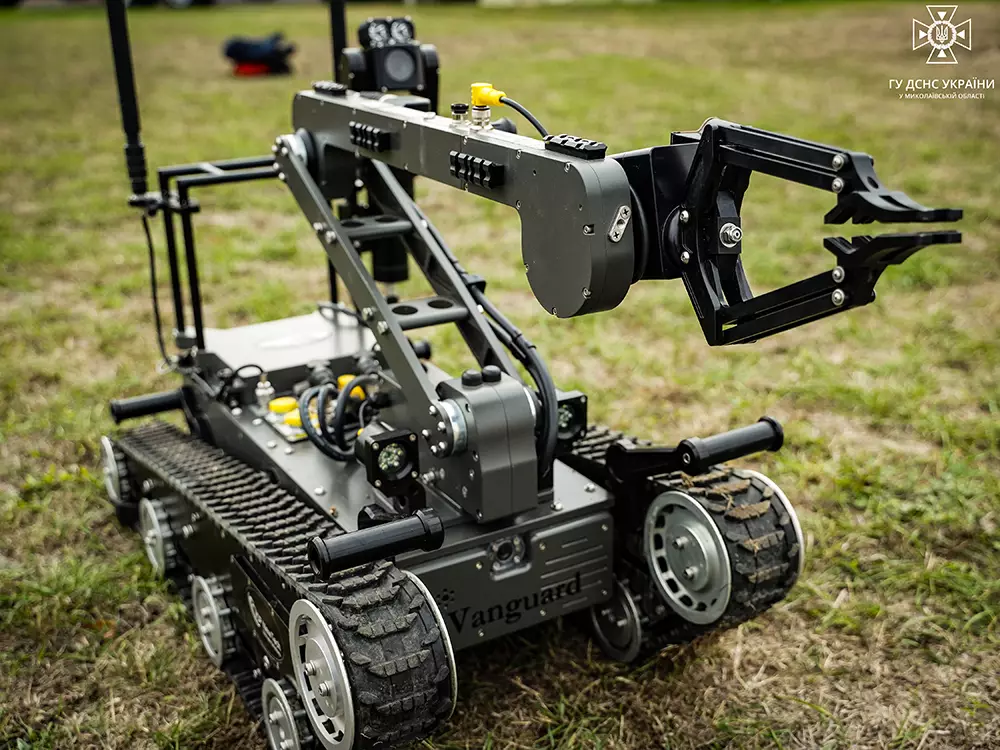
Demining robot in Mykolaiv Oblast

Nineteen soldiers from the Ukrainian 128th Mountain Assault Brigade "Zakarpattia" were killed and several others, including civilians were injured following a Russian missile attack on an awards ceremony to celebrate Artillery Day on the frontline village of Zarichne, Zaporizhzhia Oblast. The brigade's commander, Colonel Dmytro Lysiuk, who arrived late to the ceremony and was uninjured, was suspended from his position.

Russian-installed officials in occupied Kherson Oblast claimed that nine people were killed by Ukrainian shelling in Chaplynka.

President Zelenskyy announced the dismissal of Brigadier General Viktor Khorenko as commander of the Ukrainian Special Operations Forces and his replacement by Serhii Lupanchuk, following a request by defence minister Rustem Umerov.

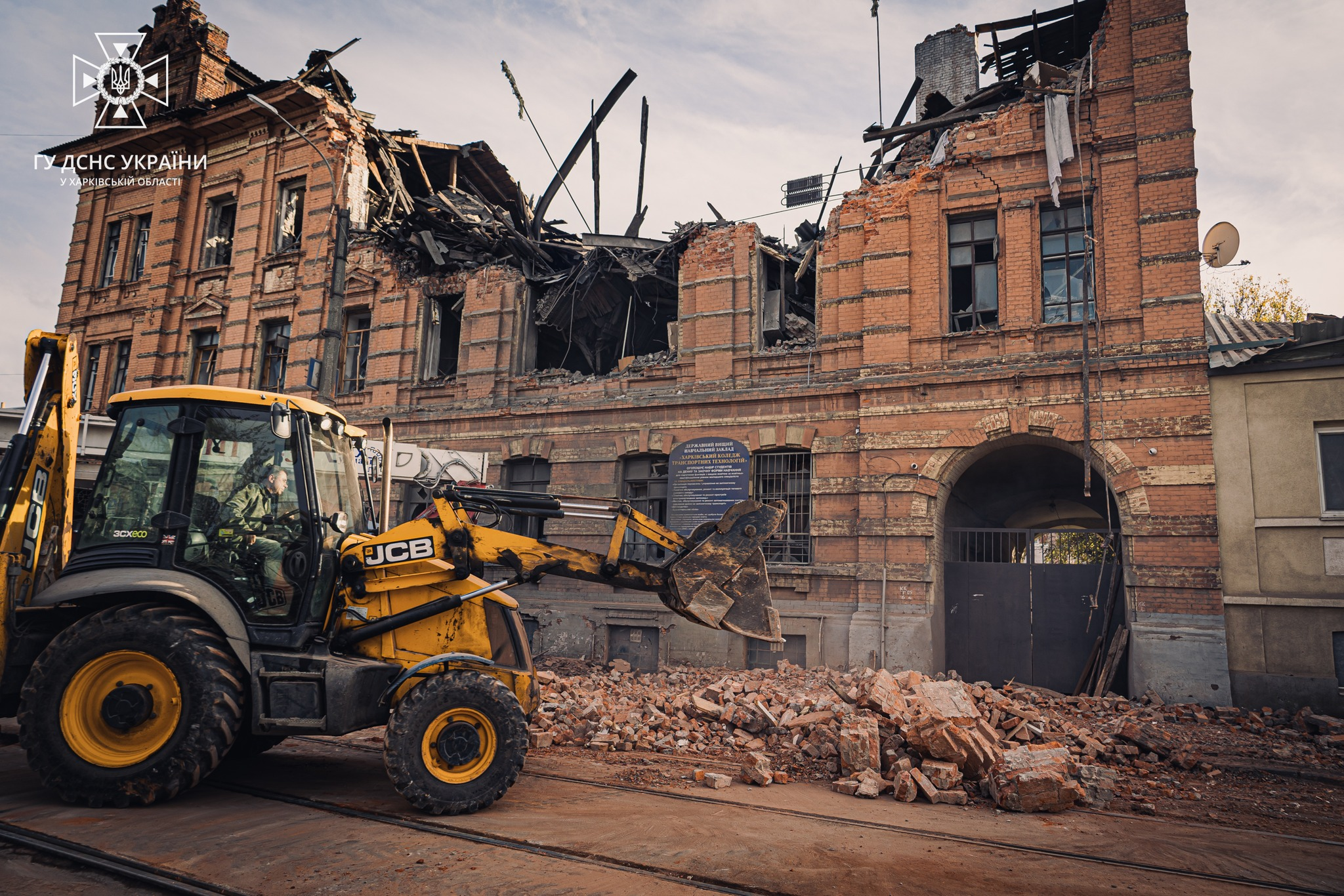
Kharkiv College of Transport Technologies after Russian drone attack on 3 November

Ukrainian military intelligence claimed that a car belonging to Igor Kuznetsov, the CEO of the Russian arms manufacturer GosNIImash, was set on fire in Nizhniy Novgorod by members of the "resistance" movement.

A court in Moscow sentenced activist Pyotr Verzilov in absentia to 8.5 years in prison for reporting on the Bucha massacre.

Dutch defence minister Kajsa Ollongren pledged ammunition to Ukraine worth €500 million ($532 million). The US pledged a $425 million military aid package to Ukraine that would include NASAMS and HIMARS munitions, TOW anti-tank missiles, 155 mm and 105 mm artillery rounds, Javelin and AT-4 anti-armor system, small-arms ammunition, and cold weather gear.

=== 4 November ===
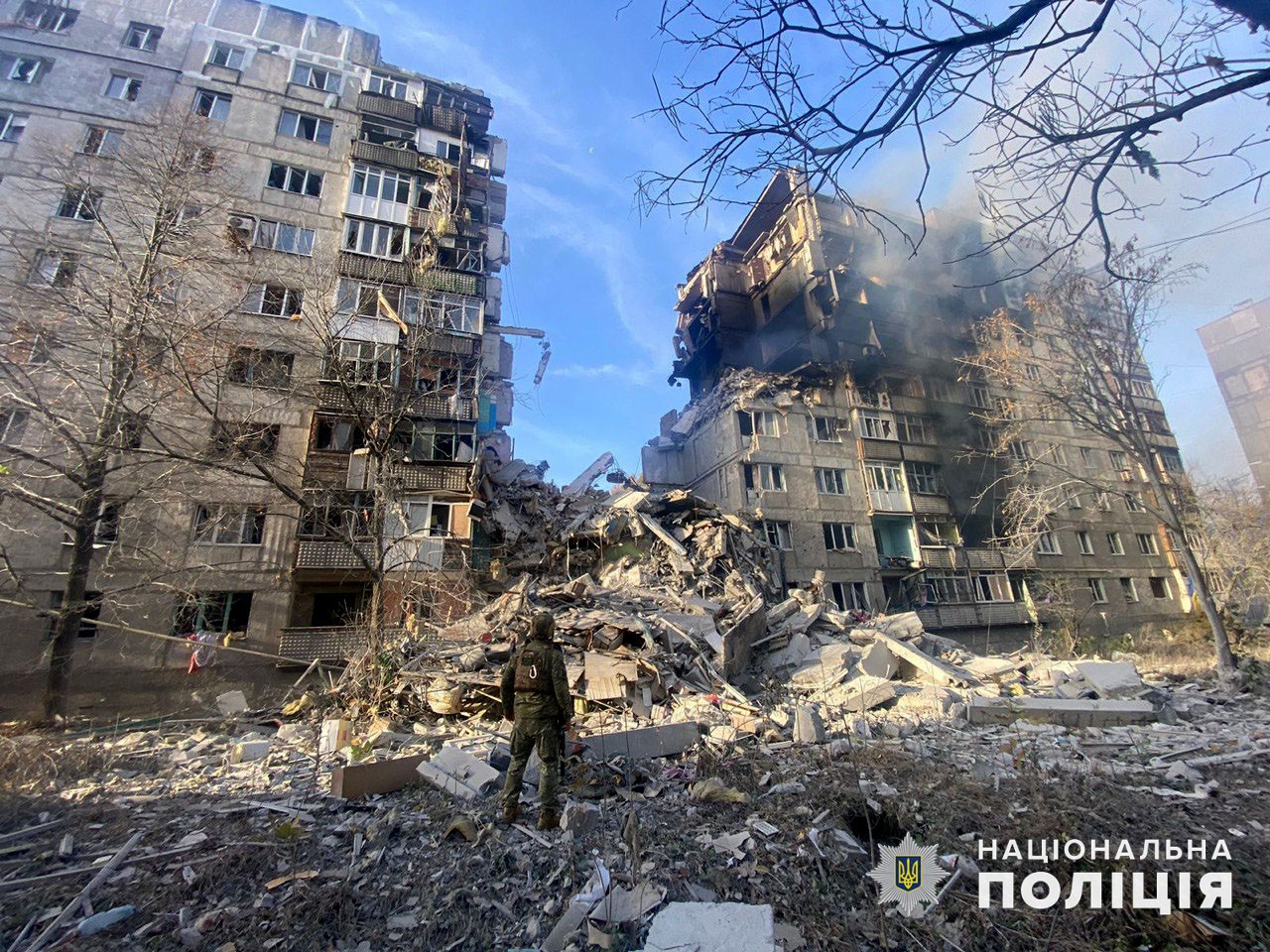
Residential building in Avdiivka after a strike

Ukraine launched a missile strike on the Zalyv Shipbuilding yard, also known as the BE Butoma shipyard, in Kerch, Crimea, hitting a dry dock and reportedly damaging the Russian cruise missile carrier Askold.

One person was killed by Russian shelling in Kherson. Another person was killed in a separate attack in Poltava Oblast.

The SBU formally charged the head of the Russian Orthodox Church, Patriarch Kirill of Moscow with supporting the Russian invasion of Ukraine and undermining the country's territorial integrity.

=== 5 November ===
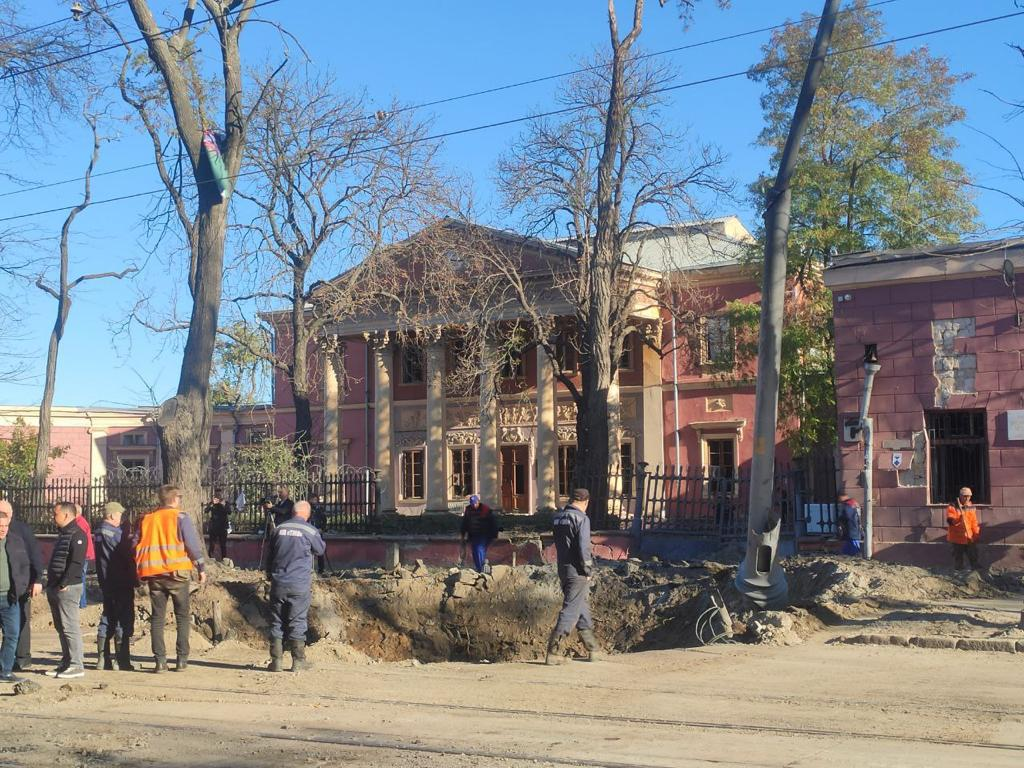
Missile crater in front of Odesa Fine Arts Museum

In the evening Russia launched an overnight air attack on Odesa, injuring eight people. 15 drones and a missile were reportedly shot down over the city. Mayor Gennadiy Trukhanov said significant damage was reported on the Odesa Fine Arts Museum housed in the Potocki Palace, where artwork was ripped from walls and windows blown off, as well as on 20 residential buildings and the water system. The museum, which was celebrating its 124th anniversary on the day of the attack, said none of its collections were destroyed.

One person was killed by Russian shelling in Dnipropetrovsk Oblast.

Ukrainian officials claimed that an explosion broke out at a Russian ammunition depot in Sedovo, occupied Donetsk Oblast.

Ukraine claimed to have destroyed a Russian Pole 21 electronic warfare system in the southern front.

=== 6 November ===
Two people were killed by Russian shelling in Donetsk and Sumy Oblasts.

Major Hennadiy Chastyakov, an aide to Ukrainian military commander General Valerii Zaluzhnyi was killed by a grenade given as a birthday present at his residence in Chaiky, Kyiv Oblast. His 13-year-old son was injured.

In his first definite statement on holding elections in wartime, President Zelenskyy called such thoughts "absolutely irresponsible" and adding that it was "not the right time" to hold such exercises.

Herman Smetanin, the head of the Ukrainian state weapons producer Ukroboronprom, announced that it had begun mass-producing of kamikaze drones with a maximum range of 1,000 kilometers in cooperation with foreign partners, adding they had been used against Russian targets.

The Russian-installed governor of Zaporizhzhia Oblast, Yevgeny Balitsky, announced the beginning of construction of a railway linking the region to Russia, starting at Yakymivka, outside Melitopol, and terminating at Rostov-on-Don and passing through Berdiansk and Mariupol. He added that the project would aid Russian military logistics by circumventing the Crimean Bridge.

The French weapons manufacturer Verney-Carron signed a 36 million euro ($38.6 million) contract to provide Ukraine with 10,000 assault rifles, 2,000 sniper rifles, and 400 grenade launchers.

Polish truckers blocked three crossings on the Poland-Ukraine border in protest over falling revenues they attributed to the relaxation of EU regulations on Ukrainian truckers. The Ukrainian government said the blockage had prevented the movement of about 20,000 vehicles on both sides of the border by 9 November.

The Kyiv Post released drone footage of what it claimed was Ukrainian special forces attacking Wagner PMC soldiers in Sudan with an explosive projectile.

=== 7 November ===
Three people were killed by Russian shelling in Bahatyr, Donetsk Oblast, while two others were killed in separate attacks in Kharkiv and Kherson Oblasts.

The Russian-installed head of the Donetsk People's Republic, Denis Pushilin, said that six people were killed and 11 others injured by Ukrainian shelling in Donetsk city.

Russia claimed to have destroyed or intercepted 15 drones over the Black Sea and Crimea, while explosions were reported near Belbek airbase.

The last 16 workers of the Avdiivka Coke and Chemical Plant were evacuated from the facility.

Ukraine imposed sanctions on nine companies linked to Russian oligarch Mikhail Fridman for providing support to the Russian war effort in Ukraine. An American court indicted seven individuals and three firms based in the US, Russia, Canada, and the United Arab Emirates for exporting US-made dual-use technologies to Russia.

A court in Moscow ordered the arrest of exiled Pussy Riot member Lucy Shtein for purportedly spreading false information on Russian military actions in Ukraine.

Five Ukrainian armoured vehicles, including a BTR-4, were deployed on the east bank of the Dnipro River near Krynky, Kherson Oblast, the first time such vehicles were seen in the area since the Russian occupation began.

President Zelenskyy said during an address that additional NASAMS systems had been received as part of increasing air defences ahead of winter without mentioning its supplier.

The Dutch Defence Ministry said five F-16s were sent to Romania for Ukrainian pilots to use in training.

=== 8 November ===
Mikhail Filiponenko, a separatist military commander of the Luhansk People's Republic during the War in Donbas and a member of the Russian-installed regional assembly, was killed by a car bomb planted by Ukrainian military intelligence and partisans in Luhansk city.

The Liberian-flagged cargo ship Kmax Ruler was hit by a Russian missile as it was entering Pivdennyi Port, Odesa Oblast to pick up iron ore bound for China, killing a Ukrainian pilot and injuring another port employee and four Filipino crew members. Two people were killed in separate attacks in Donetsk Oblast.

A court in Odesa convicted and sentenced the Russian-installed governor of Kherson Oblast, Vladimir Saldo, in absentia to 15 year's imprisonment for treason, collaborationism, and justifying the Russian invasion of Ukraine.

The European Union authorized the beginning of accession talks regarding Ukraine and Moldova joining the bloc in 2024.

In Russia, the FSB arrested a man in Buryatia for allegedly working with Ukrainian intelligence to convince Russian soldiers to defect upon deployment to Ukraine.

The UK imposed sanctions on 29 individuals and entities supporting the Russian war effort in Ukraine through "gold, oil, and strategic sectors." Among those sanctioned were a network of UAE-based gold traders believed to have channeled over $300 million in revenues to Russia, two of Russia's largest gold producers and its largest gold refiner, and the energy trading company Paramount Energy & Commodities.

The Ukraine-skeptic government of newly elected Slovak Prime Minister Robert Fico blocked the delivery of a 40.3-million-euro ($43.2 million) military aid package for Ukraine proposed by its predecessor.

=== 9 November ===
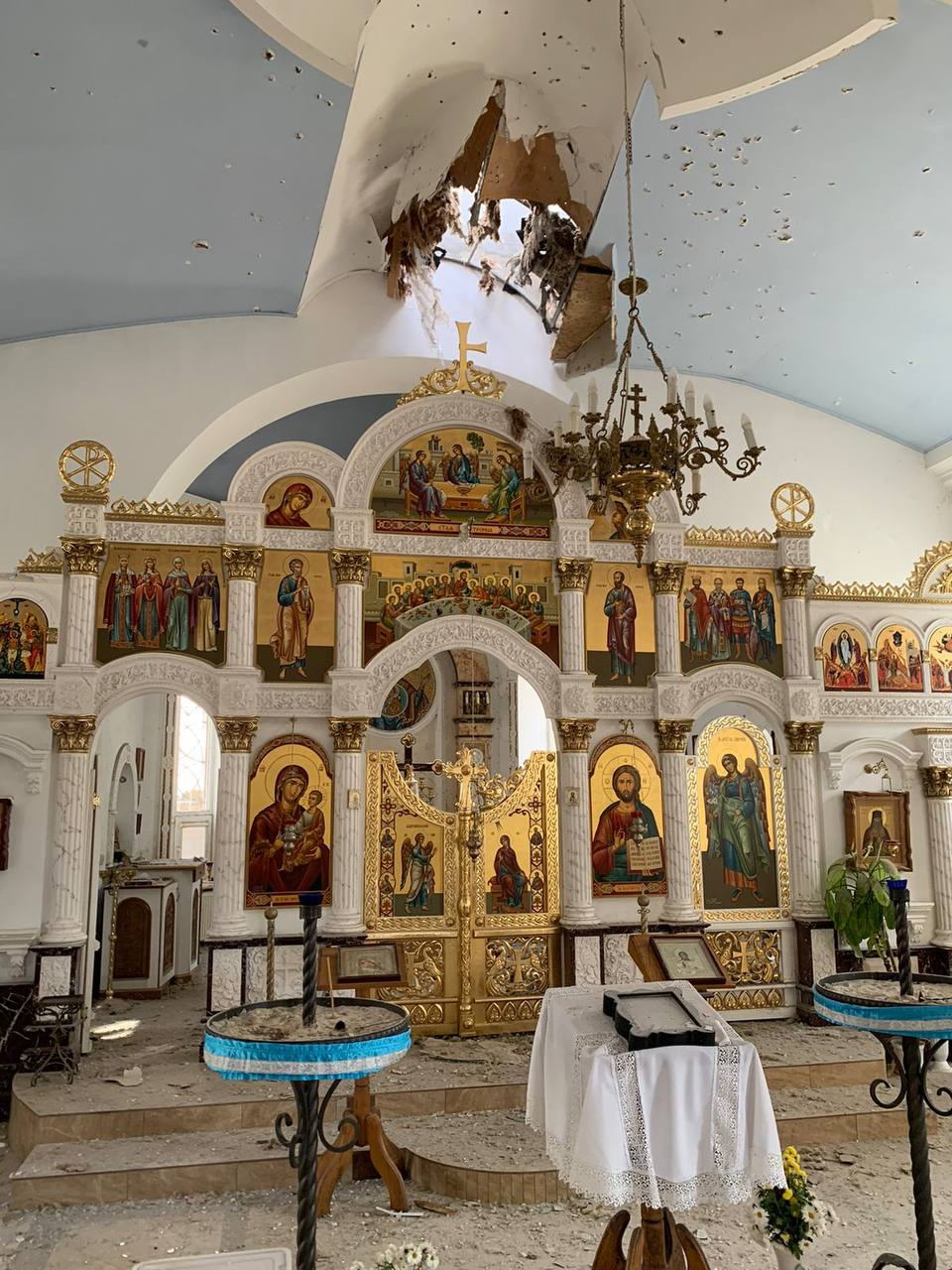
Church in Kherson after a strike

Two people were killed in Russian attacks in Kherson Oblast. 11 people were reportedly injured following a Ukrainian missile attack on occupied Skadovsk.

Russia claimed to have shot down a Ukrainian missile near the Crimean coast. Ukraine claimed to have destroyed a Tor missile system using a first-person-view drone on the Kupiansk front.

A Russian military court sentenced a Ukrainian soldier to 19 years imprisonment for alleged war crimes in Mariupol.

The NACP added the Bolero Group, one of Georgia's largest wine producers, to its International Sponsors of War list for continuing to operate in Russia.

Russian-installed officials announced that "private clinics" in Crimea have stopped providing abortions. The Russian-appointed health minister, Konstantyn Skorupskyi, said that the clinics "offered to contribute to improving the demographic situation by giving up providing abortions."

=== 10 November ===
Four people were killed in Russian attacks in Dnipropetrovsk, Kherson and Zaporizhzhia Oblasts.

Ukrainian military intelligence claimed one Serna-class landing craft and one Ondatra-class craft were sunk by naval drones in Vuzka Bay, Crimea.

Russia claimed to have intercepted two drones over Moscow and Smolensk Oblasts.

A car bomb targeting a Russian police officer was reportedly detonated by Ukrainian partisans in Mariupol.

The SBU arrested a resident of Odesa Oblast for passing information to Russian intelligence to use in air strikes. A court in Sumy sentenced a man to 15 years imprisonment for spying on behalf of the FSB and guiding a Russian column on its way to Kyiv with his car during the Northern Ukraine campaign in 2022.

The Russian State Duma was considering a bill that would allow private security to shoot down Ukrainian drones that approach energy infrastructure, which was previously reserved for "law enforcement, security agencies, and certain private security companies" with anti-terror powers.

=== 11 November ===
The Ukrainian Air Force claimed to have intercepted 19 of 31 Shahed drones launched from Russia. It also reported that Russia fired a Onyx missile from Crimea, a Kh-31 from the Black Sea and a S-300 from Belgorod Oblast. A ballistic missile was intercepted on its way to Kyiv while explosions were heard in the east bank of the Dnipro river section of the city in the first attack on the capital in 52 days.

Three people were killed by Russian shelling in Toretsk and Minkivka, Donetsk Oblast.

Ukrainian military intelligence claimed three Russian military officers were killed in a bombing orchestrated by partisans during a meeting between the FSB and Rosgvardiya at a garrison housed in a former post office in Melitopol.

In Russia, the governor of Belgorod Oblast claimed that three houses, power lines and "five railway carriages were damaged" in a Ukrainian airstrike on Valuyki. A freight train was derailed in Rybnoye, Ryazan Oblast, which officials blamed on an improvised explosive device which derailed 19 cars, damaged 15 of them and injured the driver's assistant.

A joint investigation by The Washington Post and Der Spiegel claimed that Roman Chervinsky, a former Ukrainian Special Forces commander who is currently in prison on unrelated charges was responsible for "logistics and support" for the six-person sabotage group that allegedly attacked the Nord Stream 2 pipeline. In a statement from his lawyer, Chervinsky denied any knowledge of the attack. The plan was reportedly designed to keep President Zelenskyy "in the dark".

=== 12 November ===
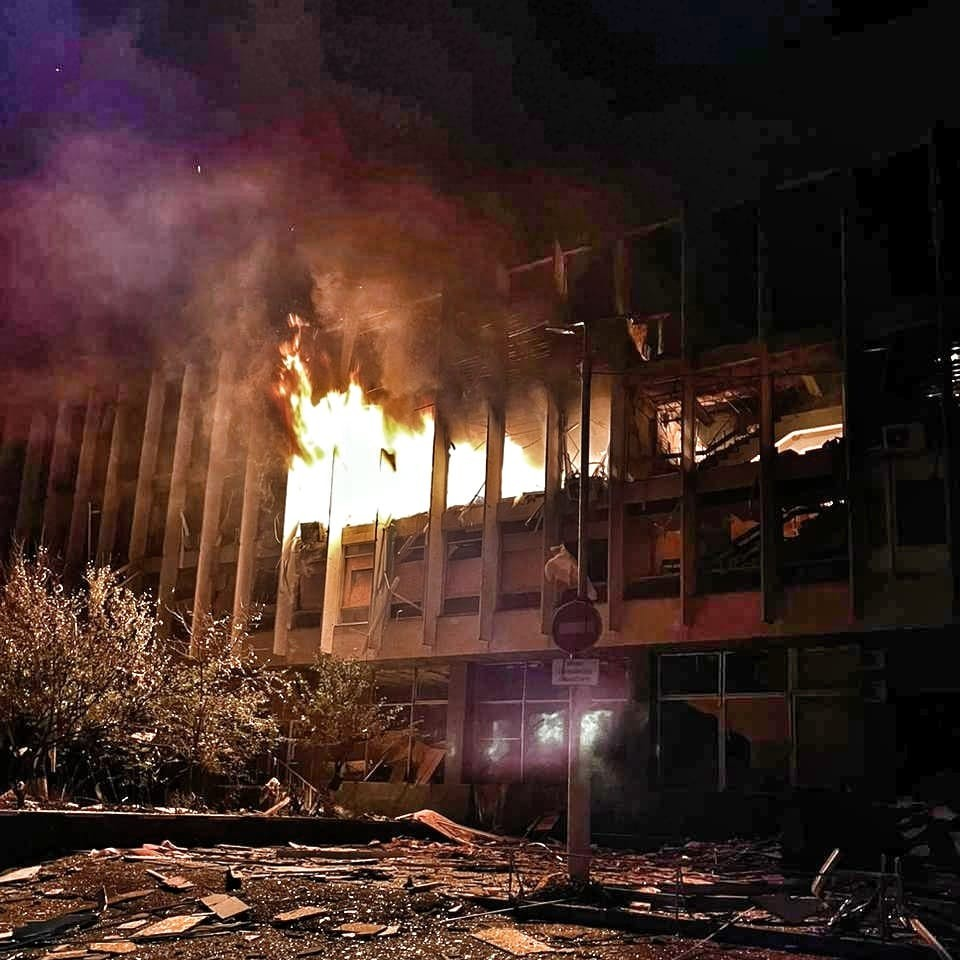
Kherson Oblast Scientific Library after Russian shelling on 12 November

One person was killed by Russian shelling in Kherson.

The Ukrainian Air Force said it had managed to reconfigure its Soviet-era Buk missile systems to enable them to fire US-made Sea Sparrow missiles.

Bloomberg reported that the government of German Chancellor Olaf Scholz will double military aid to Ukraine in 2024 to around 8 billion euros ($8.54 billion) and raise German defence spending to 2% of GDP in line with NATO policies. The German government also pledged two IRIS-T air defense systems to Ukraine.

=== 13 November ===
Three people were killed and 15 others were injured by Russian shelling in Kherson. 17 structures, including a hospital, as well as an ambulance and seven other vehicles were damaged.

The SBU arrested two people on suspicion of aiding Russian intelligence in launching airstrikes on Kyiv and Cherkasy.

A court in Lviv sentenced former MP Illia Kyva, who defected to Russia, in absentia to 14 years imprisonment for treason, following his call for Putin to launch a "pre-emptive strike" on Ukraine in 2022.

A man in Kharkiv was sentenced to life imprisonment for providing information to Russia that contributed to airstrikes on the city, including that on the regional state administration building in March 2022.

RIA Novosti and TASS published, then retracted a report saying that Russian forces were being withdrawn east of the Dnipro River. The Russian Defence Ministry attributed the report to a "fake account" linked to Ukraine, while the latter described the incident as a disinformation operation.

The US Department of Defense was reported to be purchasing approximately 60 Gepard air defence units from Jordan, which were in turn purchased from the Netherlands between 2013 and 2016, for use in Ukraine. Germany delivered a military aid package to Ukraine consisting of 10 Leopard 1A5 tanks, five Warthog armored ambulances, 10 Vector reconnaissance drones, 14 Bandvagn all-terrain vehicles, 1,000 rounds of 155 mm ammunition, 10,000 safety glasses, 1.4 million rounds of small arms ammunition, 16 more Zetros trucks, three border protection vehicles, a mine clearing tank, and 14 ground surveillance radars.

=== 14 November ===
One person was killed in a Russian drone strike in Nikopol.

Russia claimed that a munitions and explosives factory in Seltso, Bryansk Oblast was damaged by a Ukrainian drone, while other drones were shot down in Moscow, Tambov, and Oryol Oblasts. A resident of Krasnoyarsk Krai was sentenced to 7.5 years imprisonment for criticizing Russian military abuses in Ukraine and Joseph Stalin, while a resident of Tolyatti was sentenced to six years' imprisonment for defacing posters of Russian soldiers serving in Ukraine.

Sergei Khadzhikurbanov, one of five people jailed in connection with the murder of Russian journalist Anna Politkovskaya in 2006, received a presidential pardon after accepting and finishing a contract to fight in Ukraine. However, his lawyer said that he was still in Ukraine, having signed another contract to fight there as a volunteer.

The SBU arrested a man in Mykolaiv on suspicion of spying on Ukrainian air bases for Russia.

The EU pledged 100 million euros ($107.2 million) for humanitarian aid operations in Ukraine and 10 million euros ($10.7 million) to support Ukrainian refugees in Moldova. Rheinmetall announced that it was supplying 25 Leopard 1 tanks to Ukraine following an order financed by the German government.

German Defence Minister Boris Pistorius confirmed that the EU would not be able to supply Ukraine with one million 155 mm shells by March 2024.

The UK Ministry of Defence reported that Russia had increased its production of laser-guided 152 mm Krasnopol shells.

Ukraine launched an $50-million insurance program with the help of broker Marsh McLennan and Lloyd's of London to cover grain ships using its ports in case of attacks.

=== 15 November ===
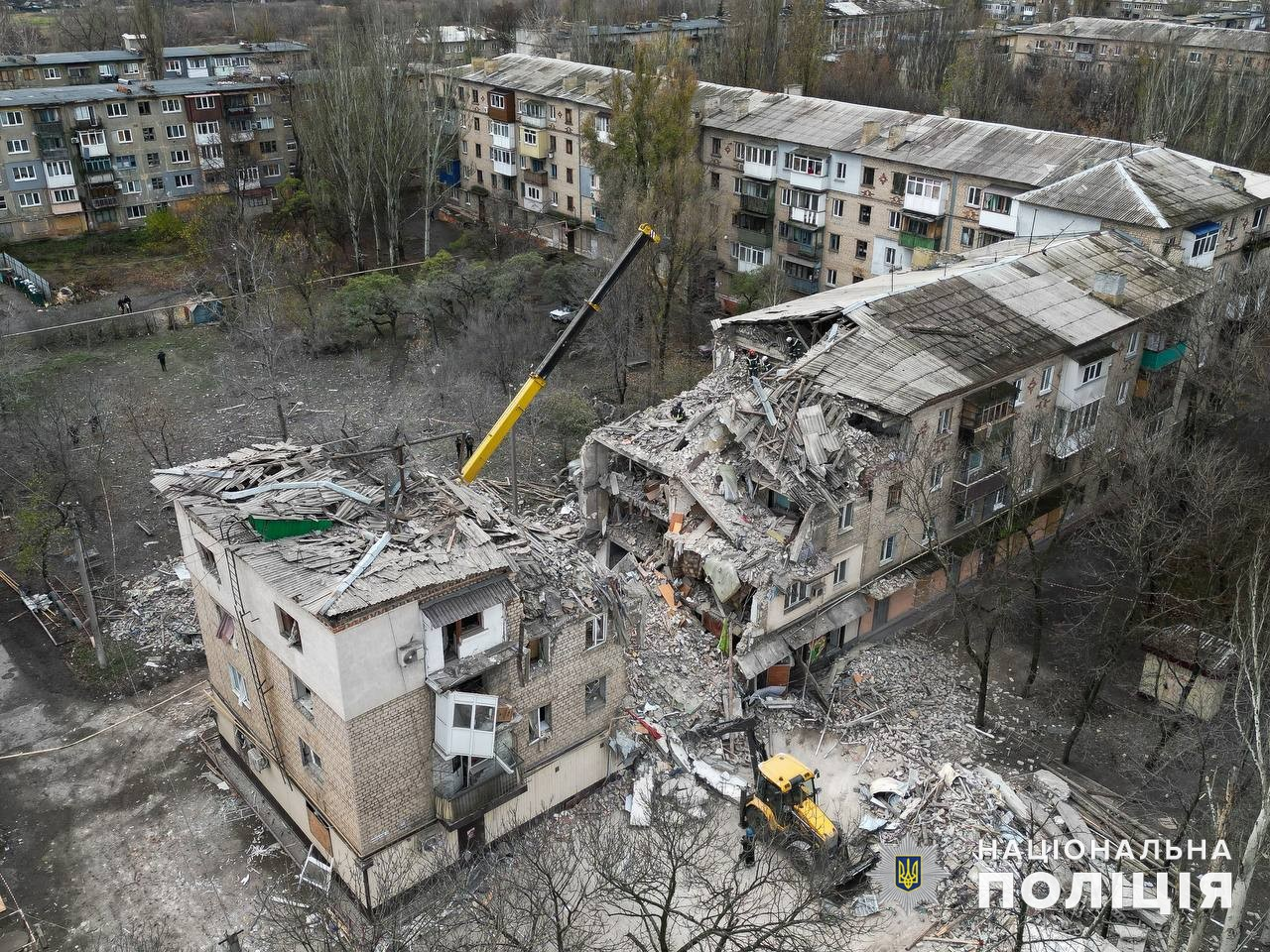
Apartment block in Selydove after the strike

Andriy Yermak, chief of staff to President Zelenskyy, acknowledged for the first time that Ukrainian forces were holding positions on the east bank of the Dnipro river. The Ukrainian military later said it had established a buffer zone of three to eight kilometers from the river's bank in Kherson Oblast.

Four Russian S-300 missiles struck Selydove, Donetsk Oblast, killing four people and injuring three. Six apartment blocks and 20 houses were damaged. Two members of the State Emergency Service of Ukraine were killed by Russian shelling in Zaporizhzhia Oblast while responding to an earlier missile attack.

The US government announced that major maintenance and repairs of Ukrainian F-16s would occur in Poland.

=== 16 November ===
One person was killed by Russian shelling in Kherson Oblast.

Ukraine claimed to have shot down 16 of 18 drones launched and a missile over Khmelnytskyi. Falling debris injured a truck driver and damaged a food warehouse.

In Russia, Oleksandr Slisarenko, the Russian-installed deputy head of the Kharkov Military–Civilian Administration, was reportedly killed in a car bombing orchestrated by the SBU in Belgorod.

A court in Saint Petersburg sentenced artist and musician Aleksandra Skochilenko to seven years' imprisonment for replacing supermarket price tags with antiwar slogans.

=== 17 November ===
Six people were killed in Russian attacks in Kherson Oblast.

Dutch defence minister Kajsa Ollongren said that the Netherlands would pledge two billion euros ($2.2 billion) in military aid to Ukraine in 2024.

The UK Defence Ministry said that it was "likely" that Russian forces were updating their A-50 early warning aircraft in anticipation of the West supplying modern fighter jets such as the F-16.

The US and Ukraine announced the holding of a joint "military industry conference" in Washington D.C. on 6–7 December 2023. The conference is in part aimed at increasing joint ventures and production between Ukraine and Western arms manufacturers.

=== 18 November ===
Ukraine claimed to have shot down 28 out of 39 Shahed drones launched by Russian forces during an attack against infrastructure that lasted the night of 17–18 November. An energy infrastructure unit and an administration building in Odesa were damaged. One civilian was wounded. In Chernihiv Oblast, two infrastructure buildings were also damaged. Drones launched towards Kyiv were all shot down.

The Russian Defence Ministry claimed that a drone was shot down over Moscow.

Ukraine imposed sanctions on 140 individuals and entities believed to be involved in the deportation of Ukrainian children from Russian-occupied territories.

=== 19 November ===
A Ukrainian attack on a dance hall hosting a theatrical performance for Russian soldiers in Kumachove, occupied Donetsk Oblast, killed 20 Russian personnel and an actress, and wounded another 100 personnel.

Ukrainian forces claimed to have expanded its bridgehead on the east bank of the Dnipro River and stopped 12 Russian attacks over the past day.

According to the Ukrainian military, some 20 Shahed drones were sent at Kyiv from multiple directions overnight; 15 were destroyed, some 10 were shot down over Kyiv and its outskirts. Five houses were damaged while an infrastructure building was "slightly damaged". One person was killed by Russian shelling in Sumy Oblast.

In Russia, a drone was reportedly shot down over Moscow Oblast.

President Zelenskyy announced the dismissal of Major-General Tetiana Ostashchenko as commander of the Ukrainian Medical Forces Command and her replacement by Major-General Anatoliy Kazmirchuk, citing the need for "a fundamentally new level of medical support" for the military.

A former Australian Army soldier fighting in the Ukrainian Army was announced to have been killed near Avdiivka sometime in October by Russian artillery.

Bohdan Yermokhin, an orphaned Ukrainian teenager from Mariupol who was deported to Russia and had publicly appealed to President Zelenskyy to help him avoid conscription in the Russian army and return to Ukraine, was repatriated following mediation by UNICEF and Qatar.

Pictures posted on X, formerly Twitter, indicated that Russia had modified its 122 mm shells for immediate use.

=== 20 November ===
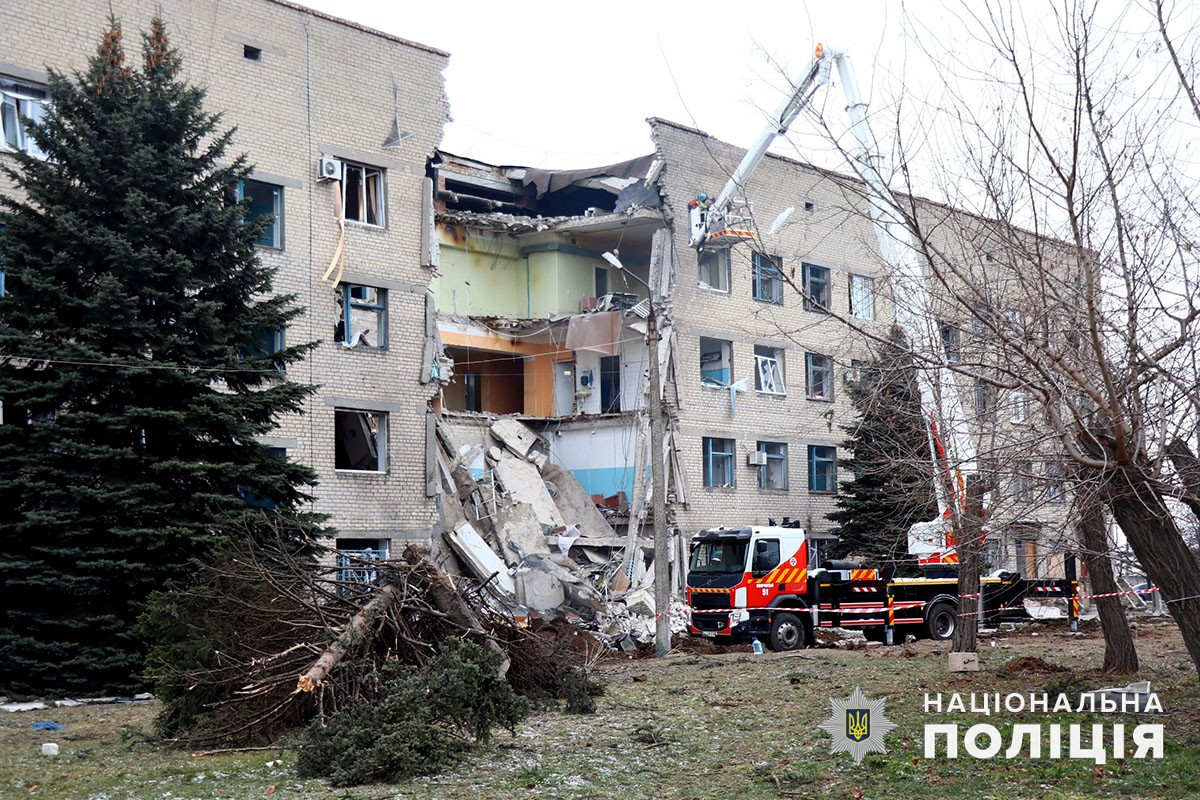
Central city hospital of Selydove after the strike

Two drivers were killed in Russian shelling of a transport facility in Kherson. An elderly woman was killed in a separate attack in Nikopol. One person was killed and 39 workers were briefly trapped following a Russian missile strike on a mine in Donetsk Oblast, while three people were killed in a missile attack on a hospital in Selydove.

The bodies of 94 Ukrainian soldiers killed in action were returned to Ukraine in a cadaver exchange with Russia, with the number of repatriated Russian personnel undisclosed.

The US government announced a $100 million military aid package to Ukraine that would include a new HIMARS launcher believed to have been fitted to fire GLSDBs, Stinger and TOW missiles and 105 mm and 155 mm shells. It also imposed sanctions on two Russian officers, Colonel Azatbek Omurbekov and Guard Corporal Daniil Frolkin for their role in the Bucha massacre.

Russia placed Ukrainian Crimean Tatar singer and Eurovision winner Jamala on its wanted list, with Russian media saying that she was wanted for posting information on the Bucha massacre.

=== 21 November ===
One person was killed in a Russian airstrike in Kherson Oblast.

In Russia, two drones were reportedly shot down over Kursk and Oryol Oblasts.

The SBU arrested a priest of the Ukrainian Orthodox Church-Moscow Patriarchate's Vinnytsia Diocese for spreading pro-Russian propaganda in his sermons and on social media.

During a visit to Kyiv, German Defence Minister Boris Pistorius announced a new military aid package valued at "1.3 billion euros ($1.42 billion)" that would include four IRIS-T missile units, anti-tank mines and 20,000 155 mm artillery shells. He also pledged the delivery of 140,000 155 mm shells to Ukraine in 2024.

=== 22 November ===
Two people were killed in Russian attacks in Donetsk Oblast. Two people were injured by Russian shelling in Nikopol which damaged eight homes and a gas pipeline and left 1,200 families without power due to damaged power lines. 14 Shahed drones were shot down while a cruise missile crashed in Zaporizhzhia causing damage to infrastructure.

Russia claimed to have destroyed four Ukrainian naval drones heading towards Crimea. It also claimed that Boris Maksudov, a journalist for Rossiya 24 was killed by a Ukrainian drone strike in the Zaporizhzhia front.

Lithuania delivered three million 7.62×51mm small arms ammunition, remote detonation systems, and winter equipment to Ukraine. Unnamed Ukrainian officials claimed that the delivery of 155 mm shells from the US had dropped by over 30% since the start of the Gaza war on 7 October, which the Pentagon denied.

A military court in Saint Petersburg sentenced a 17-year-old male to six years' imprisonment for attempting to set fire to military recruitment offices in protest over the war in Ukraine.

Poland filed espionage charges against 16 foreign nationals accused of being members of a Russian spy ring dismantled earlier in the year that sought to sabotage trains heading to Ukraine and spread anti-Ukrainian propaganda.

=== 23 November ===
Three people were killed while five others were injured following a Russian cluster munitions strike on Chornobaivka, Kherson Oblast. One person was killed in a separate attack in Beryslav.

In Russia, a student of Belgorod State University was placed in pre-trial detention on charges of terrorism after he was caught taking a photograph at a military recruitment office in Moscow. Authorities said that he planned to set the place on fire after coming into contact with Ukrainian groups, while his lawyer said he took a picture of the facility's operating hours in preparation for his draft registration.

The NACP placed Knauf on its list of International Sponsors of War for continuing to operate in Russia. Ukraine also imposed sanctions on 387 individuals and entities connected with Russia, including energy firms, former head of the Russian presidential administration Anatoly Chubais, former deputy secretary of the National Security and Defense Council of Ukraine Volodymyr Sivkovich and Leonid Kharchenko, who was convicted by a Dutch court for his role in the MH17 shootdown in 2015.

President Putin reportedly pardoned two cannibals who fought in Ukraine for six months with the Storm-Z penal battalion.

=== 24 November ===
One person was killed by Russian shelling in Kherson Oblast.

Russia claimed to have shot down 16 drones over Crimea and Volgograd Oblast.

A resident of Sloviansk, Donetsk Oblast was sentenced to 12 years imprisonment for spying on the Ukrainian military for Russia. A resident of Vinnytsia was sentenced to 15 years imprisonment for similar charges and aiding Russian airstrikes.

President Zelenskyy announced the dismissal of Yuriy Kondratyuk as first Deputy Commander of the Ukrainian National Guard and his replacement by Vadym Gladkov. Three other deputy commanders were also replaced.

The NACP removed three Greek shipping companies from its list of International Sponsors of War after they had stopped transporting Russian oil.

Russian and Chinese officials had reportedly started discussions about the possibility of building an undersea tunnel to connect Crimea to Russia, citing previous attacks on the Crimean Bridge.

The Head of the Ukrainian National Security and Defense Council, Oleksiy Danilov, told Radio Ukraine that a plan was being drawn up to demobilise conscripts who had completed their "service terms" in response to a protest held on 12 November by mostly female relatives of conscripts whom have been fighting for over 18 months.

Nearly 500 tons of humanitarian aid that arrived in Ukraine were found to have been illegally concealed from its proper recipients at three locations in Zaporizhzhia Oblast.

=== 25 November ===
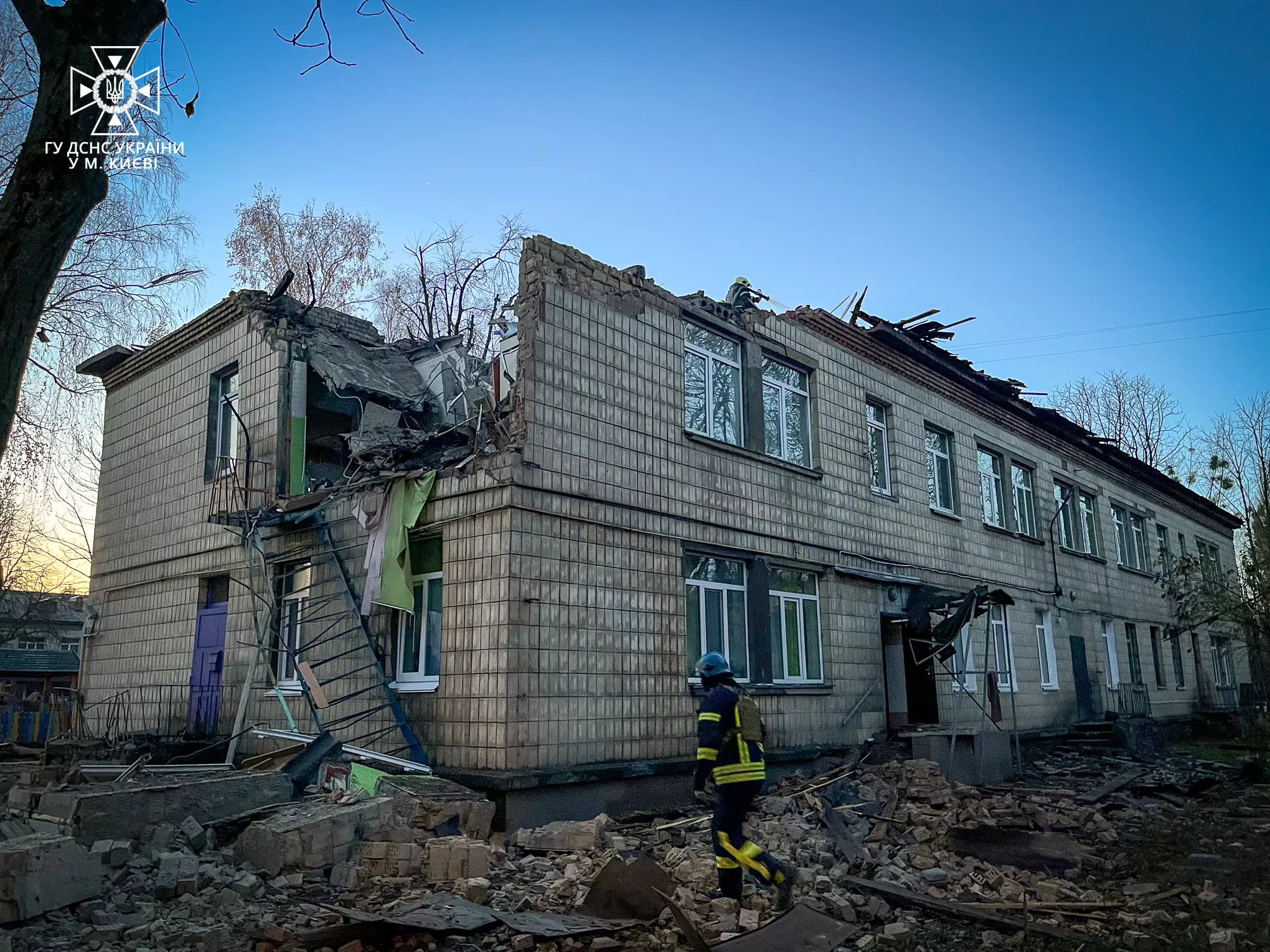
Kindergarten in Kyiv, damaged by remains of a downed drone

Ukrainian officials claimed that Russia launched what it called the largest drone attack since the invasion began at Kyiv. The Ukrainian Air Force claimed to have downed 74 out of 75 drones launched. The raid lasted some six hours. Damaged buildings were reported "in districts all across the city". Five were injured including an 11-year-old girl. A children's nursery was set on fire. Due to the attack some 200 buildings were left without power.

The EU pledged 50 million euros ($55 million) to repair Ukrainian port infrastructure damaged in Russian attacks. Azerbaijan delivered a Revival P mechanized demining machine to Ukraine.

=== 26 November ===
Russian forces claimed to have downed 24 Ukrainian drones over Moscow Oblast, Tula Oblast, Kaluga Oblast, Smolensk Oblast and the Bryansk Oblast. One civilian was injured in Tula when an intercepted drone struck an apartment building. Flights from major Moscow airports were halted. A Ukrainian strike cut off power and heat in Russian-occupied Donetsk according to officials. A "booster" from a Pantsir missile system smashed into a wall of a two-story wooden home in Moscow, starting a fire that was quickly put out by the occupants without casualties.

In Russia, an aircraft factory in Smolensk was reportedly attacked by a Ukrainian drone.

A M1A1 Abrams tank was seen in Kupiansk, the first time one was seen in Ukrainian usage.

Artem Sachuk, vice president of the Ukrainian Chess Federation, was announced by the organization to have been killed in action on the front lines.

=== 27 November ===
A car carrying pro-Russian Chechen fighters was reportedly attacked and blown up by Ukrainian partisans over the weekend in an ambush near Myrne, outside Melitopol.

Several military officials and a businessman in Kyiv Oblast were charged with allegedly selling food supplies from a military warehouse worth at least Hr 5 million ($138,000) commercially.

=== 28 November ===
Three people, including a seven-year-old child, were killed by Russian shelling in Seredyna-Buda, Sumy Oblast, while one person was killed by shelling in Nikopol.

The deputy commander of the Russian 14th Army Corps, Major General Vladimir Zavadsky, was killed by a landmine in Ukraine. Five other officers were reportedly killed in a Ukrainian airstrike that struck a meeting in occupied Yuvileine, Kherson Oblast.

Ukrainian media reported that Marianna Budanova, the wife of military intelligence head Kyrylo Budanov, had been hospitalized for heavy metal poisoning.

The SBU arrested a suspected member of a Russian spy network in Odesa who gathered intelligence to use in airstrikes.

A Russian national who was captured by Russian forces near Chernihiv during the 2022 invasion was sentenced to 12 years' imprisonment by a court in Kursk for allegedly fighting for the Ukrainian far-right group Right Sector. A court in Kazakhstan sentenced a 34-year old national to six years and eight months imprisonment for "mercenarism" after he admitted fighting for the Wagner Group in Ukraine due to financial needs.

Ukrainian truckers blocked the Medyka border crossing with Poland in protest over the ongoing blockade by Polish truckers.

=== 29 November ===
The Russian Black Sea Fleet released video of a frigate launching four Kalibr cruise missiles. Russian sources claimed that the missiles struck "enemy (Ukrainian) military infrastructure".

The Russian Ministry of Defence claimed that Russian forces had captured Khromove, a village located on the western outskirts of Bakhmut. Ukraine did not immediately give comment to the assertion.

In Russia, a warehouse storing Shahed drones in Bryansk was reportedly attacked by Ukrainian drones.

Ukrainian media reported that cyber specialists from the SBU, along with the Ukrainian hacker group Blackjack breached the website of the Russian Labour Ministry and gained access to 100 TB worth of data from its servers which included sensitive information regarding the invasion of Ukraine. It also reported that Ukrainian military intelligence orchestrated the hacking of television channels in Crimea to broadcast an evening address by President Zelenskyy.

A UK Ministry of Defence intelligence update indicated that Russian aircraft had begun deploying RBK-500 cluster bombs in glide bomb packages.

=== 30 November ===
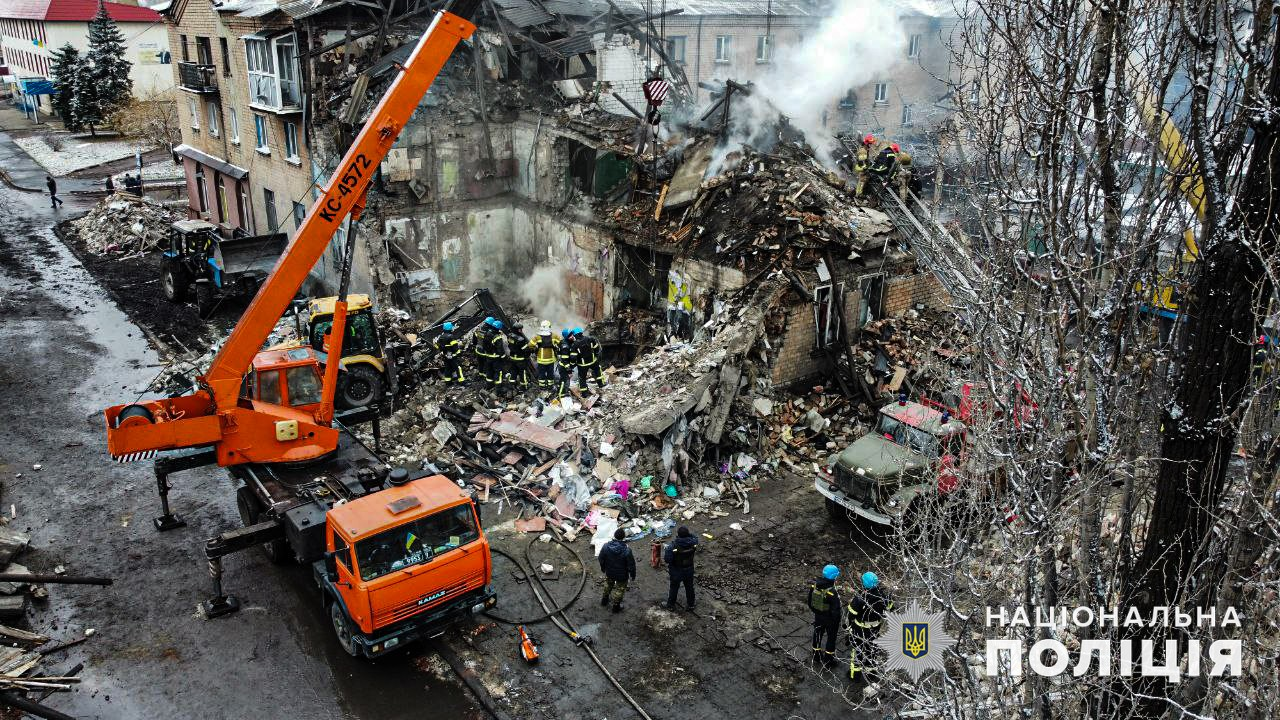
Destroyed residential building in Novohrodivka

Five people, including an eight-year-old child, were killed in a Russian airstrike on a residential building in Novohrodivka, Donetsk Oblast. Three people were killed in two attacks in Sadove, Kherson Oblast.

Ukrainian media reported that the SBU was behind a series of overnight explosions at the Severomuysky Tunnel along the Baikal-Amur Mainline in the far eastern Russian republic of Buryatia that targeted a freight train. Ukrainian military intelligence admitted responsibility for a series of sabotage attacks on railway infrastructure in Moscow Oblast.

Ukrainian Ombudsman Dmytro Lubinets said that Russia had halted prisoner exchanges with Kyiv.

The NACP added the Belgian energy firm Fluxys to its list of International Sponsors of War for storing and transporting Russian liquefied natural gas in its terminal in Zeebrugge.

Vladimir Urin resigned as director of the Bolshoi Theater in Moscow without explanation. He had previously signed an open letter calling for an end "to stop all armed activities" in Ukraine.

The Ukrainians claimed to have carried out a strike against occupied Tokmak, killing 14 Russians, "including many officers".

== See also ==
- 2023 in Russia
- 2023 in Ukraine
- 2023 Ukrainian counteroffensive
- Outline of the Russo-Ukrainian War
- Bibliography of Ukrainian history
- War crimes in the Russian invasion of Ukraine
- List of wars involving Russia
