= Timeline of the Russo-Ukrainian war (8 April – 28 August 2022) =

Timeline of the Russo-Ukrainian war (2022–present)
- Prelude; (up to 23 February 2022); Initial invasion; (24 February – 7 April 2022); Southeastern front; (8 April – 28 August 2022); 2022 Ukrainian counteroffensives; (29 August – 11 November 2022); Second stalemate; (12 November 2022 – 7 June 2023); 2023 Ukrainian counteroffensive; (8 June 2023 – 31 August 2023); 2023 Ukrainian counteroffensive, cont.; (1 September – 30 November 2023); 2023–2024 winter campaigns; (1 December 2023 – 31 March 2024); 2024 spring and summer campaigns; (1 April – 31 July 2024); 2024 summer–autumn offensives; (1 August – 31 December 2024); 2025 winter–spring offensives; (1 January 2025 – 31 May 2025); 2025 summer offensives; (1 June 2025 – 31 August 2025); 2025 autumn–winter offensives; (1 September 2025 – 31 December 2025); 2026 winter–spring offensives; (1 January 2026 – 31 May 2026); 2026 summer offensives; (1 June 2026 – 31 August 2026); 2026 autumn–winter offensives; (1 September 2026 – present)

This timeline of the Russo-Ukrainian war covers the period from 8 April 2022, when the area of heavy fighting shifted to the south and east of Ukraine, to 28 August 2022, the day before Ukraine announced the start of its Kherson counteroffensive.

== April 2022 ==
=== 8 April ===
A train station in Kramatorsk was hit by a Russian rocket strike, killing at least 57 people and wounding 109 others. Pavlo Kyrylenko, governor of Donetsk Oblast, said thousands of people had been at the station at the time the two rockets struck. The Russian Ministry of Defence denied responsibility for the attack.

As the European Council adopted a fifth package of restrictive measures against Russia, President of the European Commission Ursula von der Leyen met Ukrainian President Volodymyr Zelenskyy in Kyiv. The two visited Bucha's mass graves, where President von der Leyen told reporters that "the unthinkable" had happened there. Later that day the two held a press conference where von der Leyen handed over to Zelenskyy a questionnaire for joining the EU. She was accompanied by Josep Borrell, who expressed "confidence that EU states would soon agree to his proposal to provide Ukraine with an additional €500 million to support the armed forces in their fight against the Russian army."

A Russian defence ministry spokesperson said high-precision missiles of the Bastion coastal missile system destroyed a foreign mercenary assembly and training centre near the village of Krasnosilka northeast of Odesa. However, this could not be verified.

=== 9 April ===
Russian president Vladimir Putin appointed Army General Aleksandr Dvornikov, commander of the Southern Military District, as commander of Russian forces in Ukraine. Dvornikov had previously commanded Russian forces during the Russian military intervention in Syria.

Russian forces hit a storage tank containing nitric acid in Rubizhne, according to Serhiy Haidai, the governor of Luhansk Oblast. He added that the tank contained about three tons of acid.

New graves with dozens of Ukrainian civilians were found in Buzova, a liberated village near Kyiv that for weeks had been occupied by Russian forces.

The United Kingdom's Prime Minister Boris Johnson met Zelenskyy in Kyiv, offering armored vehicles, anti-ship missile systems, and promising loans and an easing of tariffs.

=== 10 April ===
Valentyn Reznichenko, the head of Dnipro's military administration, said that Dnipro Airport and its surrounding infrastructure was completely destroyed by Russian shelling.

=== 11 April ===
The Russian Defence Minister stated that high-precision sea-based Kalibr missiles on the southern outskirts of Dnipro destroyed equipment from a S-300 anti-aircraft missile division supplied to Ukraine by a European country, which was hidden in a hangar. Four S-300 launchers and up to 25 Ukrainian Armed Forces personnel were also hit. The Government of Slovakia, having previously confirmed a donation of its S-300 air defence system to Ukraine, denied Russian claims.

Chancellor of Austria Karl Nehammer met with Putin in Moscow, the first visit from a Western leader since the invasion began. He said the conversation with Putin was "very direct, open and tough" and that the meeting with Putin was "not a friendly visit".

The Ukrainian Catholic relief organisation Caritas-Spes announced that two of its workers and five other people were killed in a Russian attack on its Mariupol office.

=== 12 April ===
In a Telegram statement, the Azov battalion stated that Russian forces dropped "a poisonous substance of unknown origin" from an unmanned aerial vehicle onto Ukrainian military and civilians in the besieged port city of Mariupol. Petro Andryushchenko, an adviser to the mayor of Mariupol, said that city officials were awaiting additional information from military forces, and speculated that in one possible scenario, the "discharge of an unknown chemical" could be "a test".

The Russian Defence Ministry claimed that high-precision air-based and sea-based missiles destroyed one ammunition depot and a secure hangar containing aircraft at Starokostiantyniv Air Base in Khmelnytskyi Oblast, as well as one ammunition depot near Gavrilovka near Kyiv.

=== 13 April ===
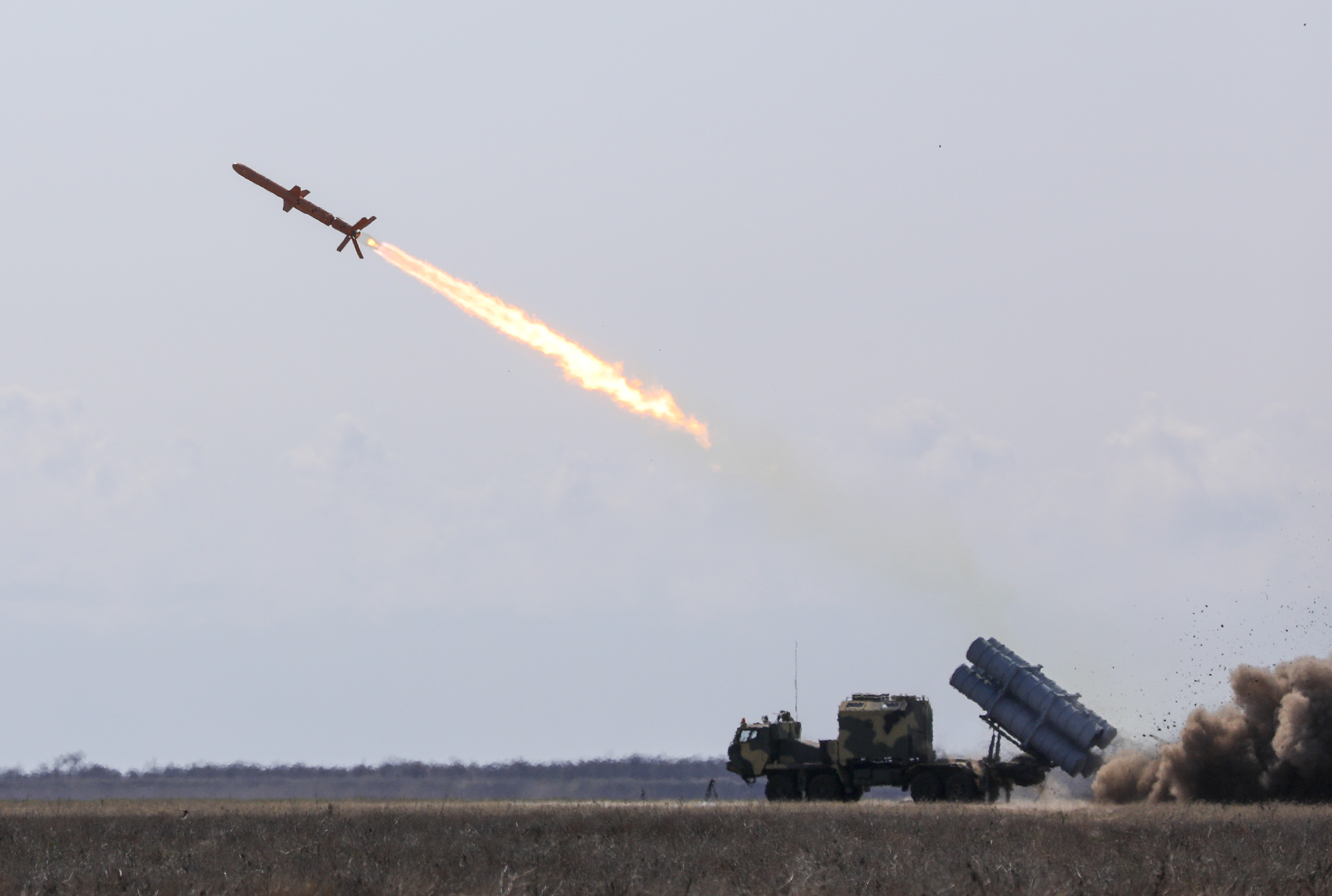
R-360 Neptune anti-ship cruise missile, two of which, according to Ukraine, struck the Moskva before it sank.

The Russian Defence Ministry claimed 1,026 soldiers of Ukraine's 36th Marine Brigade, including 162 officers, surrendered in Mariupol. The Ukrainian Defence Ministry said it had no information about this, but Denys Prokopenko, commander of the Azov Regiment, later confirmed that some defenders had surrendered.

Ukraine claimed that the Russian guided-missile cruiser Moskva, flagship of the Black Sea Fleet, was hit by two Ukrainian Neptune anti-ship cruise missiles and set on fire. The Moskva later suffered a munition explosion due to the fires. The Russian Defence Ministry confirmed that the warship had suffered serious damage and that all its crew had been evacuated but it remained afloat, which the Pentagon confirmed. Russia claimed the damage was due to an accidental fire, and measures were being taken to tow the ship back to port. It subsequently sank.

Russian Deputy Foreign Minister Sergei Ryabkov warned that Russia would see U.S. and NATO vehicles transporting weapons on Ukrainian territory as legitimate military targets. He added that any attempts by the West to inflict significant damage on Russia's military or its separatist allies in Ukraine would be "harshly suppressed".

Ivan Ariefiev, the military administration spokesperson of Zaporizhzhia Oblast, said that Russian forces attacked Novodanylivka village with phosphorus bombs.

=== 14 April ===
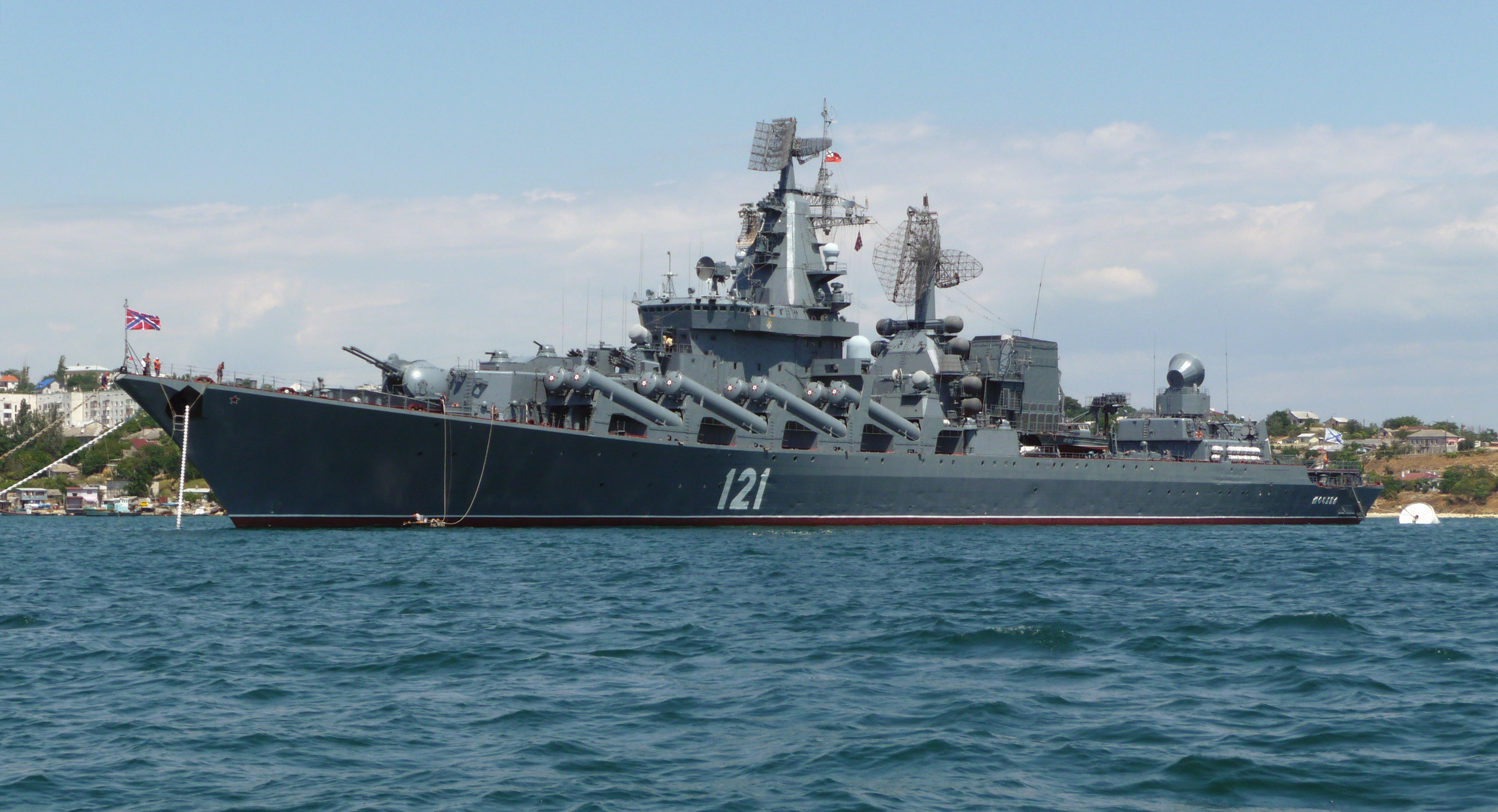
Russian cruiser Moskva which sank in the Black Sea, purportedly following Ukrainian military action.

Russia claimed two heavily armed Ukrainian combat helicopters conducted at least six airstrikes on residential buildings in Bryansk Oblast. The governor of Belgorod Oblast said that a village there was also attacked, but that no one was injured.

Russian authorities accused Ukraine of shelling the town of Klimovo and the village of Spodorashino. Additionally, Russia's Federal Security Service (FSB) stated that Ukrainian soldiers opened fire at the Novye Yurkovichi border checkpoint in Bryansk Oblast.

Russia's Ministry of Defence stated that the Russian cruiser Moskva, which Ukraine said it had hit the previous day, had sunk in the Black Sea while being towed to port.

=== 15 April ===
The Russian Defence Ministry stated that its S-400 defense systems had shot down a Ukrainian Mi-8 helicopter allegedly used to attack Klimovo. It also said that the Illich Steel and Iron Works in Mariupol had been taken by Russian forces and claimed that its strategic rocket forces had "eliminated up to 30 Polish mercenaries" in a strike on the village of Iziumske.

Ukrainian forces regained control of Rohan in Kharkiv Oblast.

=== 16 April ===
Russia said that it had destroyed production buildings of an armoured vehicle plant in Kyiv and a military repair facility in Mykolaiv using high-precision air-launched long-range weapons. It also claimed to have downed a Ukrainian Su-25 jet near Izium.

Russian officials said that Major general Vladimir Frolov was killed in combat in Ukraine. Russian officials also stated that there had been 23,677 deaths of Ukrainian military personnel so far. This was the first time that Russian officials had made public claims regarding this death toll.

=== 17 April ===
Russia claimed to have destroyed an ammunitions factory near Brovary in Kyiv Oblast using high-precision, air-launched missiles.

=== 18 April ===
Putin bestowed an honorary title on the 64th Motor Rifle Brigade accused by Ukraine and by the international community of committing war crimes in Bucha, giving them the title of Guards for their defense of the "motherland and state interests" and praising the "mass heroism and valor, tenacity, and courage" [sic] of its members.

Lviv was hit by five missiles according to Lviv Oblast Governor Maksym Kozytskyy. Three of the missiles damaged military infrastructure installations and one hit a tyre shop, causing several civilian deaths.

President Zelenskyy announced that Russia had begun an offensive in the Donbas.

=== 19 April ===
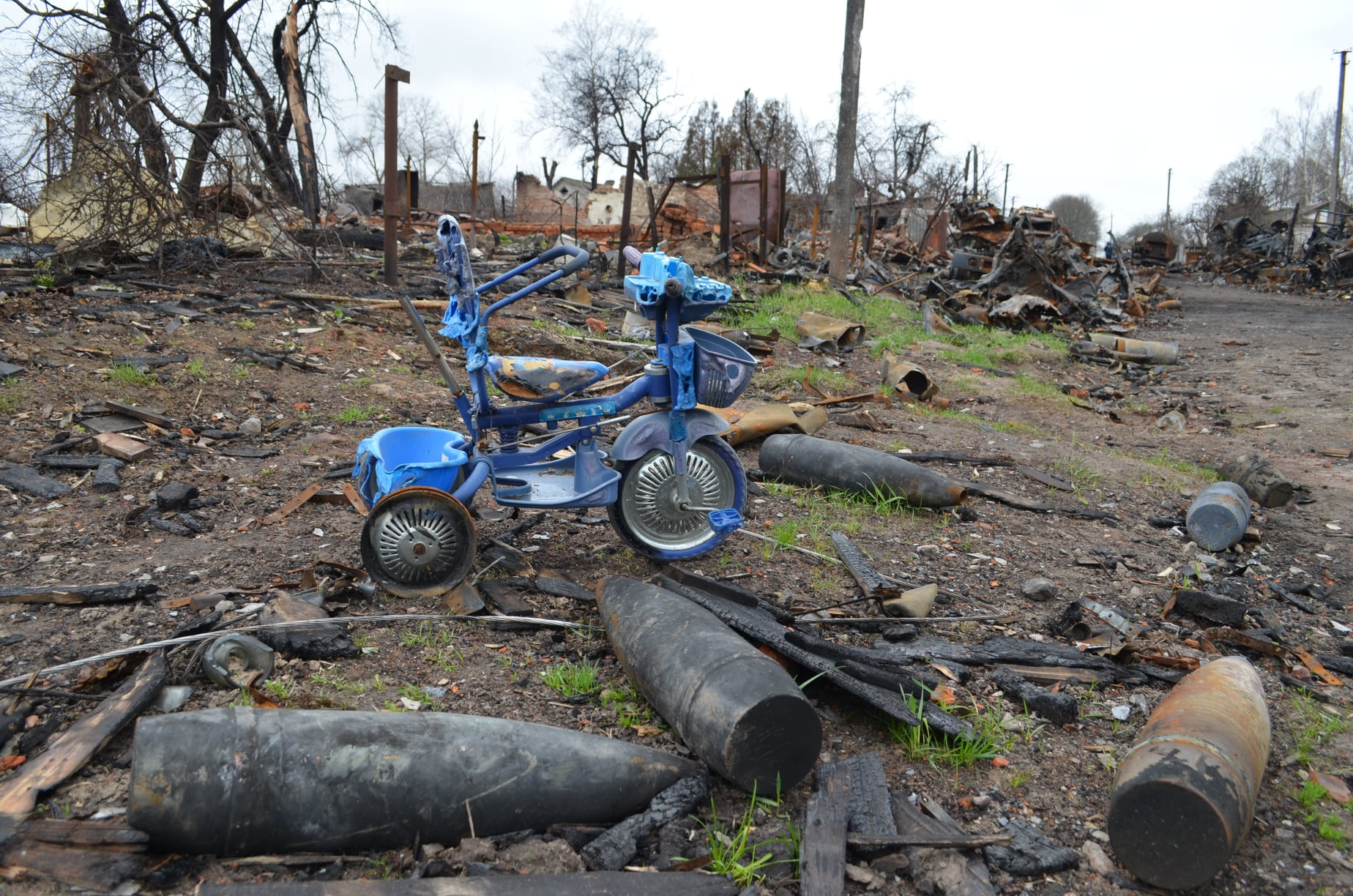
Aftermath of the invasion in Shestovytsia village, 19 April

Serhiy Haidai, governor of Luhansk Oblast, said that Russian forces had seized the city of Kreminna. Russian Foreign Minister Sergei Lavrov said that "another phase" of the invasion had begun.

=== 20 April ===
The Russian Defence Ministry said that its forces had hit 1,053 Ukrainian military facilities overnight and destroyed 106 firing positions.

Ukraine accused Russia of bombing a hospital sheltering 300 people in Mariupol.

=== 21 April ===
Putin declared victory in Mariupol in spite of remaining Ukrainian holdouts at the Azovstal Iron and Steel Works. In a televised meeting, Russian Minister of Defence Sergei Shoigu said that it would take three or four days to clear the plant; however, Putin said that such an operation would be "impractical" and ordered a blockade of the plant instead. Prime Ministers Pedro Sánchez of Spain and Mette Frederiksen of Denmark visited Ukraine to meet with Zelenskyy.

=== 22 April ===
Major General Rustam Minnekayev, the deputy commander of Russia's Central Military District, admitted that the aim of the "second phase" of the country's invasion of Ukraine was to fully seize Donbas and Southern Ukraine, and to establish a land corridor with Transnistria, a Russian-occupied breakaway republic which is internationally recognized as being part of Moldova. He added that there was "evidence that the Russian-speaking population is being oppressed" in Transnistria, without providing further detail into his accusations. The Ministry of Defence of Ukraine criticized this and accused Russia of imperialism.

A Ukrainian Antonov An-26 transport plane crashed in Zaporizhzhia Oblast, killing the pilot and injuring two other people. The administration said initial information indicated the plane hit an electricity pole, but some Russian reporters suggested in social media posts that Ukrainian forces had accidentally downed the plane with MANPADS.

Ukrainian officials acknowledged that Russia had taken control of 42 small towns and villages in eastern Ukraine.

=== 23 April ===
The Ukrainian military hit a Russian command post near Kherson, allegedly killing two Russian generals and wounding one.

A Russian missile strike hit Odesa. Anton Gerashchenko, an adviser to the Interior Ministry, said that at least one missile had landed and exploded, and residential buildings were hit. Officials said at least six people had died.

=== 24 April ===
Ukrainian forces bombard Russian positions in the Izium region, April 2022

The Russian Defence Ministry stated that its high-precision missiles struck nine Ukrainian military targets overnight, including four arms depots near Kharkiv where artillery weapons were stored. It also said that its missile and artillery forces destroyed four more depots in the area, and hit a facility producing explosives for the Ukrainian army near Dnipropetrovsk.

Ukrainian officials said that Russian forces conducted airstrikes on the besieged Azovstal Iron and Steel Works to try to dislodge the Ukrainian troops inside.

=== 25 April ===
Russia stated that it struck Ukrainian military installations and the Kremenchuk Oil Refinery near the Dnipro River. The Russian Defence Ministry said that high-precision long-range weapons destroyed six railway stations near Krasnoe, Zdolbuniv, Zhmerynka, Berdychiv, Kovel, and Korosten, through which foreign weapons and military equipment were supplied to the Ukrainian troops in Donbas. Russia announced a ceasefire around the steelworks to allow civilians to leave, but a senior Russian diplomat declared that "a general ceasefire is not a good option at the moment, because it will give Ukrainian forces the chance to regroup and to stage more provocations". However, the Ukrainian Deputy Prime Minister said that no agreement on a corridor had been reached for the evacuation of civilians from the Azovstal steel plant.

Several explosions reportedly occurred at the State Security Ministry in Transnistria, according to the Interior Ministry. Ukraine's Defence Ministry said the incident was a "planned provocation" by Russia itself to instill "panic and anti-Ukrainian sentiment".

US Secretary of State Antony Blinken and Secretary of Defense Lloyd Austin took a train from Poland to meet Ukrainian officials, including Zelenskyy, in Kyiv.

=== 26 April ===
UN Secretary-General António Guterres made a three-day trip to Russia and Ukraine amid criticism for the limited role played by the United Nations in the crisis. Guterres had a "frank discussion" with Foreign Minister Lavrov and met with Putin.

=== 27 April ===
Russia stated that a series of blasts hit targets in oblasts bordering Ukraine. Officials also reported a fire at an ammunition depot and that a Ukrainian drone had been intercepted.

=== 28 April ===
Ukraine's military said that Russia was "increasing the pace" of the invasion, while Putin promised "lightning-fast" strikes on anyone who interfered with Russia's goals.

Russia began ordering the occupied city of Kherson to use rubles as currency.

The Russian Defence Ministry stated that it had destroyed six Ukrainian arms and fuel depots and hit 76 Ukrainian military facilities.

Russia-backed separatist forces in Donetsk Oblast said that they had arrested more than 100 Ukrainian troops suspected of being involved in crimes.

Two powerful blasts were heard in the Russian city of Belgorod. Ukraine did not directly accept responsibility but described the incidents as payback and "karma" for Russia.

United Nations Secretary-General António Guterres met with Zelenskyy and visited Borodyanka, Bucha, and Irpin, where he said: "The war is evil. And when one sees these situations our heart, of course, stays with the victims". As he went back to Kyiv, one missile reportedly struck the lower floors of a 25-storey residential building, injuring at least 10 people and killing one, according to Ukrainian officials. Dmytro Kuleba, the Minister of Foreign Affairs of Ukraine, called the Russian missile strikes in Kyiv a "heinous act of barbarism".

=== 29 April ===
Roman Starovoyt, the governor of Russia's Kursk Oblast, said that mortars were fired at a checkpoint in the village of Krupets. He added that the Russian border guards and military responded with retaliatory fire.

=== 30 April ===
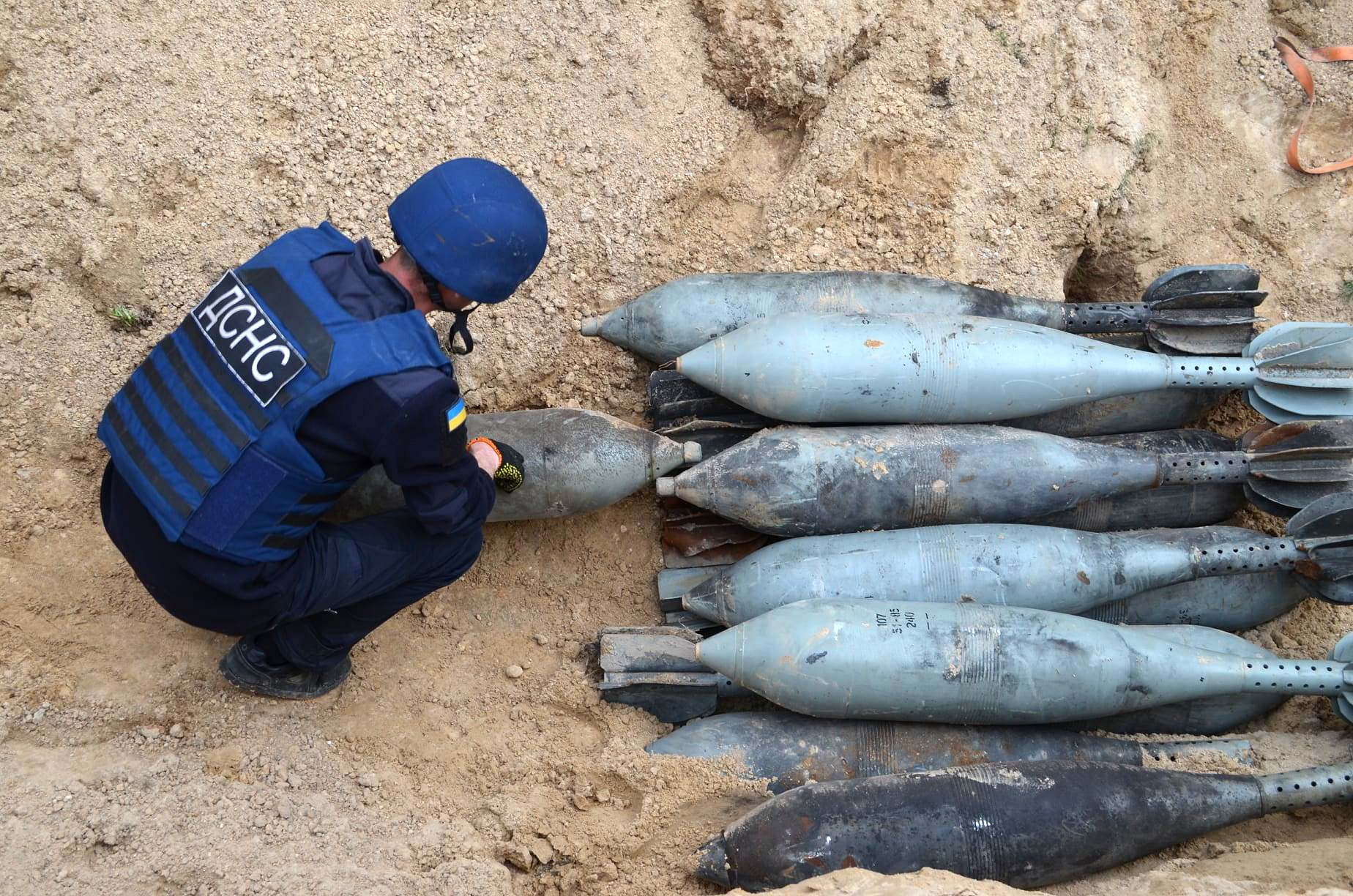
Disposal of ammunition from 2S4 Tyulpan near Chernihiv after the siege of the city.

Russia stated that it had destroyed 389 military facilities in Ukraine overnight, including 35 control centres and 15 arms depots.

The Ukrainian military said that Russia had conducted a missile strike at Odesa Airport, damaging the runway and rendering it unusable. Odesa's regional governor, Maksym Marchenko, stated that Russia had used a Bastion system in Crimea; the Russian Defence Ministry said that it had used high-precision Onyx missiles.

== May 2022 ==
Surveillance footage of a missile strike on a grain warehouse in Dnipropetrovsk Oblast.

=== 1 May ===
The Russian Defence Ministry stated that its air defence systems had shot down two Ukrainian Su-24M bombers over Kharkiv Oblast overnight.

=== 2 May ===
Authorities in Odesa Oblast said that a Russian rocket strike hit a strategically important bridge across the Dniester Estuary.

Ukraine stated that its Bayraktar drones sank two Russian Raptor patrol boats near Snake Island. The Ukrainian Defence Ministry also released aerial thermal camera footage showing explosions on two small military vessels.

=== 3 May ===
Dmytro Zhyvytskyi, the governor of Sumy Oblast, said that Russia had shelled three villages overnight, with no reported casualties.

=== 4 May ===
Ukraine stated that Russian troops had entered the Azovstal Iron and Steel Works complex after launching an all-out offensive on the area. However, Russia denied this.

The Russian military said that it had used sea- and air-launched precision guided missiles to destroy electric power facilities at five railway stations across Ukraine, while artillery and aircraft also struck troop strongholds and fuel and ammunition depots.

=== 5 May ===
The Russian Defence Ministry stated that its missiles destroyed aviation equipment at the Kanatove airfield in Kirovohrad Oblast and a large ammunition depot in Mykolaiv.

=== 6 May ===
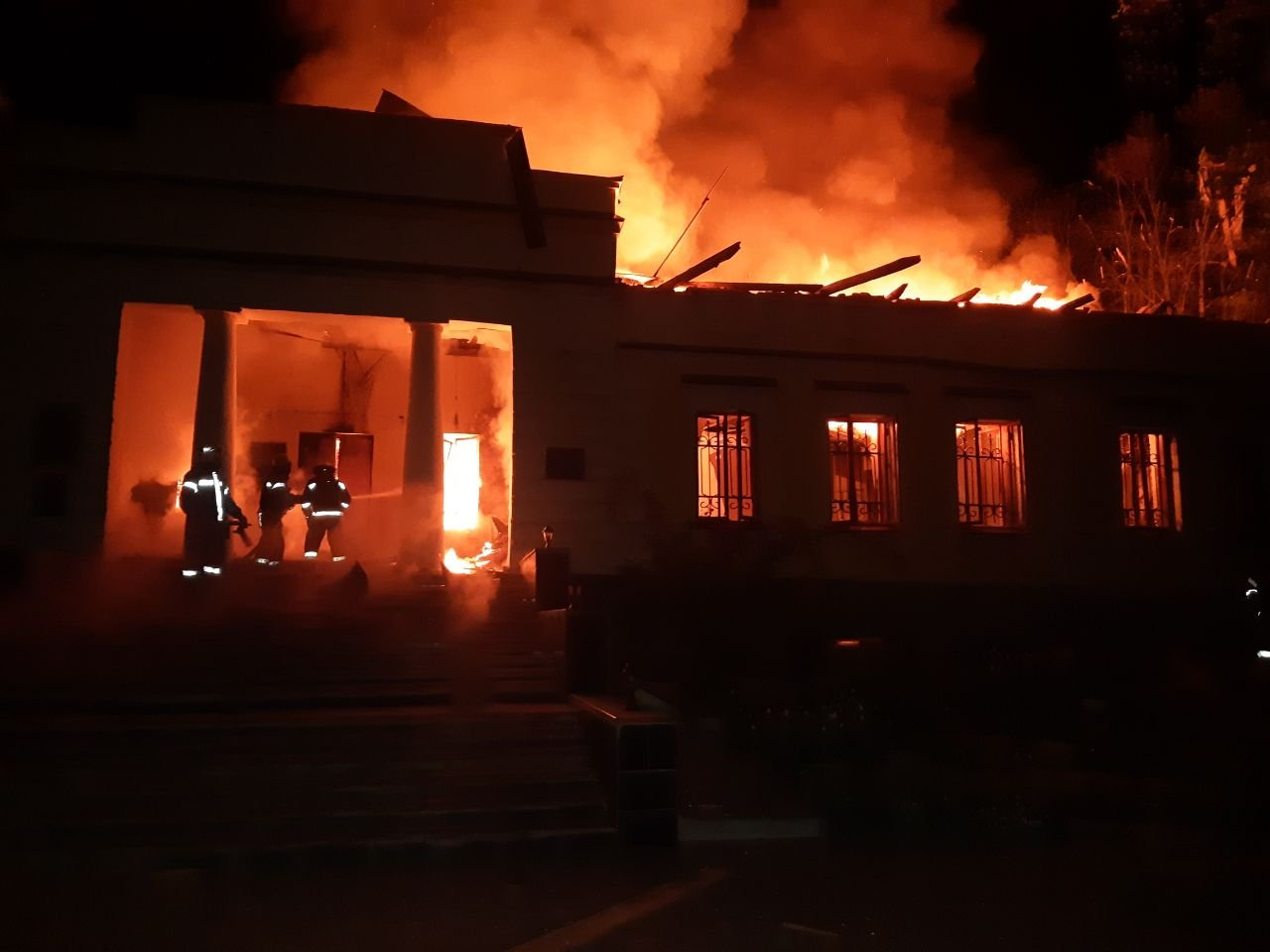
Memorial museum of Gregory Skovoroda in Kharkiv Oblast after shelling on 6 May

Ukraine said that the Russian frigate Admiral Makarov, part of the Black Sea Fleet, was hit by a Ukrainian Neptune anti-ship cruise missile, setting the ship on fire. Dumskaya, a Ukrainian-state news site, said Russian forces had sent helicopters to rescue the crew of the ship. Ukrainian presidential adviser Anton Herashchenko stated that Russian navy ships stationed in Crimea were sent to help the Admiral Makarov. On 7 May, the adviser to the Office of the President of Ukraine Oleksii Arestovych said that the report was a "misunderstanding", and that the vessel attacked near Snake Island was actually a Serna-class landing craft.

Oleh Synyehubov, governor of Kharkiv Oblast, reported multiple shelling attacks, one of which caused a fire that nearly destroyed the Hryhoriy Skovoroda Literary Memorial Museum.

=== 7 May ===
Russia claimed to have destroyed a large stockpile of military equipment from the United States and European countries near the Bohodukhiv railway station in Kharkiv Oblast. It also claimed to have hit 18 military facilities overnight, including three ammunition depots in Dachne, and that Russian aircraft had shot down a Sukhoi Su-24, a Su-27 fighter jet, three Mil Mi-8 helicopters, and two Bayraktar TB2 drones near Snake Island; the Ukrainian lead vessel of the 47 ton Centaur-class, DSHK-1 Stanislav, was also said to be destroyed.

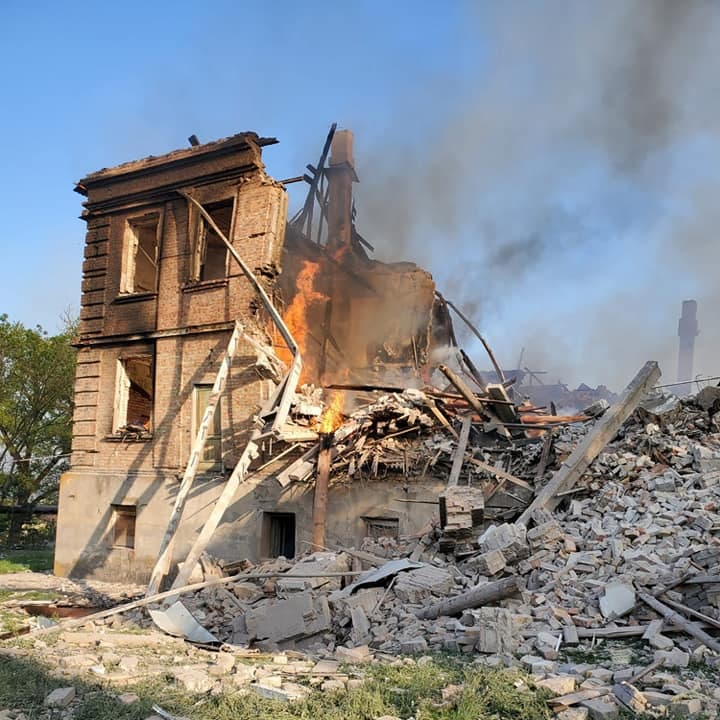
School in Bilohorivka after bombing.

Serhiy Haidai, governor of Luhansk Oblast, said that Russia dropped a bomb on a school in the village of Bilohorivka. Two people were killed, and 60 others were feared dead. In addition, he said that according to preliminary information, shelling in the village of Shypilovo had destroyed a house, and 11 people were trapped under the building's debris.

Ukraine said that it had used a Bayraktar TB2 drone to strike a Russian Serna-class fast-landing craft docked at Snake Island. It also said that it had destroyed a Forpost reconnaissance and strike UAV over Odesa.

Ukraine confirmed that Colonel Ihor Bedzay, the deputy head of the Ukrainian Navy, was killed when his Mi-14 was shot down by a Russian Su-35.

=== 8 May ===
Serhiy Haidai said that Ukrainian forces withdrew from Popasna.

Haidai also said that Russian forces tried multiple times to cross the Siverskyi Donets River using a pontoon bridge in order to encircle Sievierodonetsk. He said that local forces had destroyed speed boats and helicopters and "ruined Russian boat bridges three times". He added that in repeated attacks, Ukrainian troops had "eliminated approximately 70 units of Russian heavy weapons and equipment", disrupting attempts to cross.

Russian shelling hit Sumy Oblast, damaging a historic Jewish cemetery in Hlukhiv.

=== 9 May ===
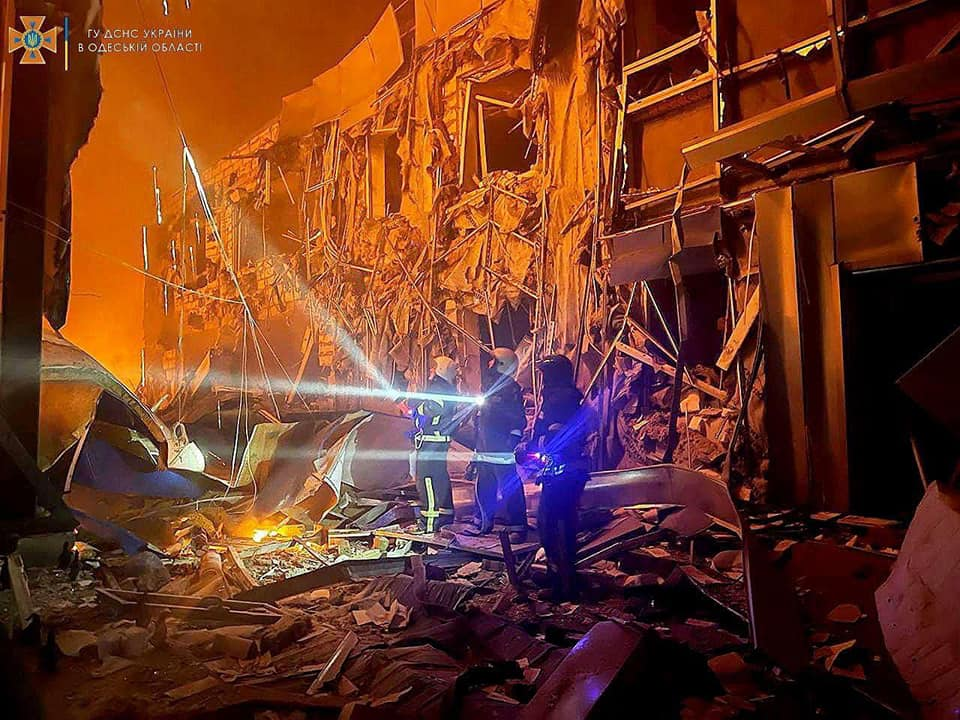
Shopping mall near Odesa after the bombing on 9 May

A shopping mall and two hotels were hit by Russian missile strikes near Odesa, causing multiple casualties.

=== 10 May ===
American Defense Intelligence Agency Director Scott Berrier said that both sides were "at a bit of a stalemate", with neither side making advancements in the south or east.

Ukraine repulsed a Russian attempt to cross the Siverskyi Donets River, causing tens of Russian equipment losses and hundreds of casualties.

=== 11 May ===
Kirill Stremousov, deputy head of the Moscow-controlled Kherson Military-Civilian Administration, said that there would be a request to make Kherson Oblast a full-fledged constituent of Russia.

Sloviansk mayor Vadym Lyakh said that Russian missiles hit two districts.

Russia reportedly lost "the better part of two or more army battalions" (including over 70 armored vehicles) attempting to cross the Siverskyi Donets River for the second time in 24 hours.

=== 12 May ===
Russia claimed its forces hit two ammunition depots in Chernihiv Oblast. It also claimed to have destroyed a Ukrainian S-300 air defence missile system in Kharkiv Oblast and a radar station near Odesa, and shot down a Ukrainian drone near Snake Island. It was also reported that Russian forces had seized Rubizhne.

Ukraine claimed to have damaged the Russian logistics support ship Vsevolod Bobrov. It was later reported that the ship suffered major fire damage on the night of 11–12 May close to Snake Island.

=== 13 May ===
U.S. Secretary of Defense Lloyd Austin and Russian Minister of Defense Sergei Shoigu held telephone talks for the first time since the start of the invasion.

=== 14 May ===
Ukraine's general staff said that the Russians were withdrawing from Kharkiv and focusing on guarding supply routes.

Russia dismissed Ukraine's assertion it had damaged the Vsevolod Bobrov and showed photos of what it said was the vessel with no signs of damage.

=== 15 May ===
Ukraine said that it had launched a counter-attack against Russian forces near Izium.

NATO Deputy Secretary General Mircea Geoana said that the Russian invasion was "losing momentum" and that "Ukraine could win this war". The UK MoD said that Russia had likely lost one-third of its forces deployed since February.

Ukrainian forces stated that they had reached the Russian border after advancing from Kharkiv. Zelenskyy said that the Russian forces were at a "dead end".

Ukraine stated that its forces destroyed 11 Russian aerial targets, including two cruise missiles, seven Orlan-10 UAVs, one Ka-52 helicopter, and one Mi-28 helicopter.

=== 16 May ===
The Ukrainian military reported that Russian troops had destroyed or damaged 23 houses in Donbas.

Russia's Defence Ministry said that its forces shot down a Su-25 aircraft near the settlements of Yevhenivka in Mykolaiv Oblast, another Su-25 near Velyka Komyshuvakha in Kharkiv, and a Su-24 near Snake Island.

Mykolaiv Mayor Oleksandr Senkevych stated that Russia had shelled a residential area, setting a store and a car on fire, while also damaging a gas pipeline.

=== 17 May ===
Ukrainian forces surrendered to Russian and DPR troops and were evacuated from the Azovstal plant, marking the end of the Siege of Mariupol. Deputy Defence Minister Hanna Malyar said, "Thanks to the defenders of Mariupol, Ukraine gained critically important time to form reserves and regroup forces and receive help from partners. And they fulfilled all their tasks. But it is impossible to unblock Azovstal by military means." 211 soldiers were evacuated via a humanitarian corridor to Olenivka, a town in the DPR. Another 260 soldiers, including 53 seriously wounded, were taken to a hospital in the DPR town of Novoazovsk.

=== 18 May ===
The Melitopol regional administration stated that a Russian armored train carrying troops and ammunition overturned, causing the ammunition to detonate.

Russian forces secured full control over Mariupol.

=== 19 May ===
Russia said that it was using a new generation of powerful laser weapons in Ukraine to burn up drones.

=== 20 May ===
Rocket strike on the Lozova Palace of Culture building

Russia hit the Palace of Culture in Lozova in Kharkiv Oblast with missiles. Zelenskyy condemned the attack, describing it as "absolute evil" and "absolute stupidity".

Russia said that it had almost completely captured Luhansk Oblast.

=== 21 May ===
Russia claimed to have launched Kalibr cruise missiles to destroy a large consignment of weapons and military equipment supplied to Ukraine by the United States and Europe. Russia also said that it had struck fuel storage facilities near Odesa and shot down two Ukrainian Su-25 aircraft and 14 drones.

=== 22 May ===
President Zelenskyy extended the country's martial law for three months through to 22 August.

Russia said that it hit Ukrainian forces with airstrikes and artillery in Mykolaiv Oblast and the Donbas, targeting command centres, troops, and ammunition depots.

Russia's RIA news agency reported that Andrei Shevchik, the Russian-appointed mayor of Enerhodar, was in intensive care after being injured in a blast.

=== 23 May ===
Denis Pushilin, the leader of the Donetsk People's Republic, said that the Ukrainian fighters who surrendered at the Azovstal steel plant in Mariupol would face a trial in the separatist region. However, he did not specify what charges the fighters would face.

=== 24 May ===
Kirill Stremousov, the deputy head of the civil-military regional administration of Kherson, said that a request would be made to Russia to set up a military base in Kherson. He added that a Russian military base was essential for the security of the region and its inhabitants.

Ukraine stated that Russian forces had launched an all-out assault to encircle Ukrainian troops in the twin cities of Sievierodonetsk and Lysychansk, which are situated on the east and west banks of the Siverskiy Donets river respectively.

Pavlo Kyrylenko, the head of the Donetsk regional military administration, said that Russian forces had taken control of the town of Svitlodarsk and that Ukrainian forces had withdrawn in order to regroup.

President Zelenskyy said that 50–100 Ukrainian soldiers were being killed per day. He also stated that the previous week, 70+ soldiers were killed in a single attack on a military base near Kyiv.

Ukraine stated that it had shot down retired Major General Kanamat Botashev flying a Su-25 using a Stinger missile. It was unknown if he was in service, or was a private military contractor.

=== 25 May ===
The Russian State Duma passed a law that allows for the recruitment of older soldiers. A note accompanying the proposed law read: "For the use of high-precision weapons, the operation of weapons and military equipment, highly professional specialists are needed. Experience shows that they become such by the age of 40-45."

Russian forces were reported to be shelling Sievierodonetsk with mortars. Ukraine said that 6 people were killed.

=== 26 May ===
Ukraine stated that Russia was conducting offensive operations across multiple sectors of the front, with efforts focused on establishing full control over the village and rail hub of Lyman, as part of alleged preparations for a renewed assault on Sloviansk. The village of Ustynivka, south of Sievierodonetsk, was reportedly assaulted in an effort to improve Russian positions in the area. Russian forces were also reported to be continuing attacks near the Lysychansk-Bakhmut road, with assaults on Komyshuvakha, Lypove, and Nahirne. Assaults were also reported around Avdiivka, and near the village of Zolota Nyva. Additionally, Russian forces were reported to be resuming offensives to establish full control over Kherson Oblast, with assaults against the village of Tavriyske to the south of Mykolaiv, and Mykolayivka to the south of Kryvyi Rih. Shelling was also reported against civilian and military targets across the front.

=== 27 May ===
Ukrainian officials stated that ~90% of buildings in Sievierodonetsk had been damaged.

UK Prime Minister Boris Johnson said that Russian forces were "continuing to chew through ground", adding that they were making slow, but palpable progress. Following requests by Ukraine for the US and UK to provide them with Multiple Launch Rocket Systems (MLRS), Johnson stated that these would enable Ukrainians to defend themselves against Russian artillery, and that "that's where the world needs to go."

Ukraine said that one of its MiG-29s shot down a Russian Su-35 during an aerial dogfight over Kherson Oblast, at approximately 2:00 p.m. local time.

Ukraine stated that it had shot down a retired Russian pilot, Colonel Nikolai Markov, who was reportedly flying an Su-25 over Luhansk Oblast.

=== 28 May ===
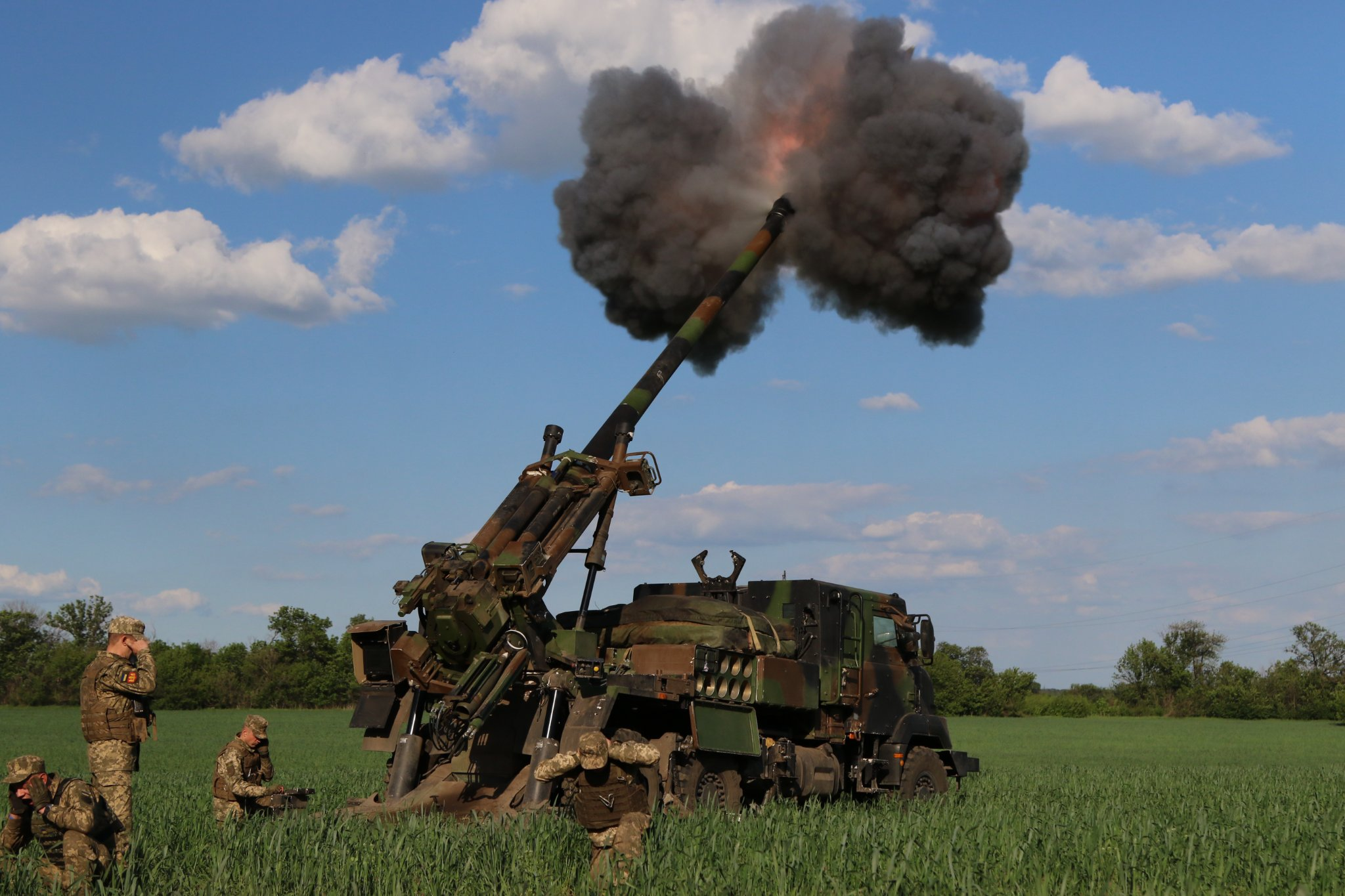
Ukrainian artillerymen fire a CAESAR howitzer in May 2022

Serhiy Haidai said that Ukrainian forces near Sievierodonetsk may have to retreat from Luhansk Oblast to avoid encirclement and capture by Russian forces.

Russia captured Lyman in Donetsk Oblast, which contained road and rail bridges crossing the Siverskyy Donets River.

President Zelenskyy said that the situation in Ukraine was very difficult, especially in the Donbas and Kharkiv Oblast.

=== 29 May ===
The Institute for the Study of War said that Russian forces had suffered "fearful casualties" in the Battle of Sievierodonetsk, but that Ukraine had also lost forces. Governor Haidai stated that the Lysychansk-Bakhmut road was the last one connecting Sievierodonetsk to the outside, and that it was expected to be the focus of continued attacks by the Russians, as they attempted to complete a pincer maneuver.

President Zelenskyy visited Kharkiv, marking his first official visit outside Kyiv since the start of the war.

Ivan Fedorov, the mayor of Melitopol, stated that a bomb blast had occurred, injuring two people.

=== 30 May ===
Serhiy Haidai said that Russian troops had entered the outskirts of Sievierodonetsk, amid heavy fighting.

The US announced that it would not send Ukraine MLRS systems that fire missiles with a 185-mile range, capable of striking well into Russia. Former Russian President Dimitri Medvedev said the decision was "reasonable". The US noted that it was still considering sending shorter-range (20–40 mile) MLRSes.

=== 31 May ===
Ukraine stated that it had a limited counteroffensive in the northern part of the Kherson Oblast. Russian forces reportedly launched a number of assaults during the previous 48 hours against Ukrainian positions near the Inhulets River, apparently without either side making progress.

== June 2022 ==
=== 1 June ===
The United States agreed to send the High Mobility Artillery Rocket System (M142 HIMARS) to Ukraine on the assurance from the leaders of Ukraine that it would not be used against targets in Russia. Kremlin spokesman Dmitry Peskov said that this move was "pouring fuel on the fire."

Ukraine said that a nitric acid tank in a chemical factory in Sievierodonetsk was hit by Russian bombardment, forcing people to stay indoors.

German Chancellor Olaf Scholz said that Germany will supply Ukraine with modern surface to air missiles to protect cities from Russian air attacks.

Mykolaiv Regional Governor Vitaliy Kim stated that Russian forces had started blowing up bridges near Kherson as "they were afraid of a counterattack by the Ukrainian army".

=== 2 June ===
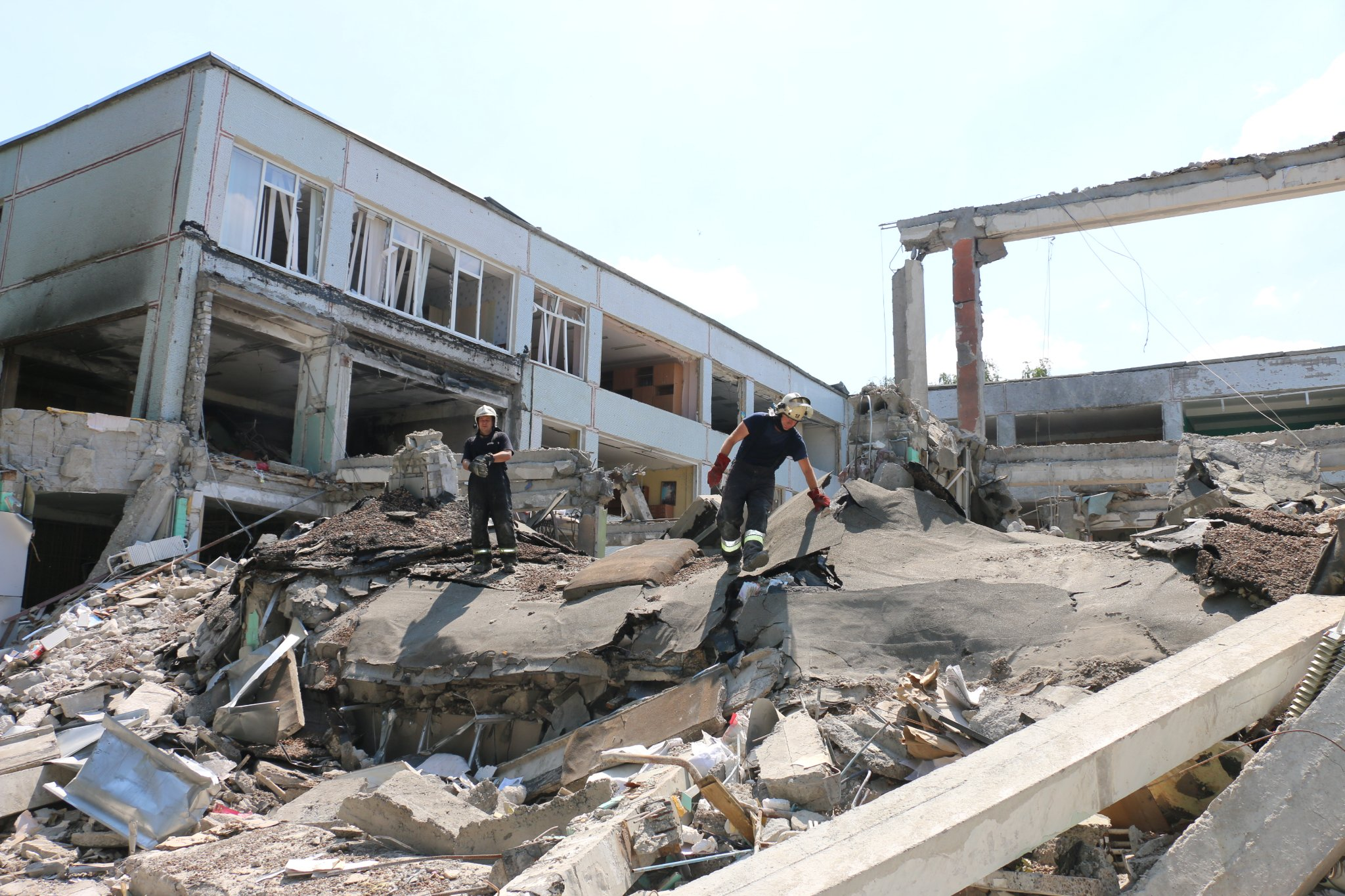
Rubble of Kharkiv Specialized School No. 17 after Russian shelling on 2 June.

The United States Cyber Command confirmed that it was conducting cyber operations on behalf of Ukraine. General Paul Nakasone, the commander of USCYBERCOM, said, "We've conducted a series of operations across the full spectrum: offensive, defensive, [and] information operations."

President Zelenskyy said that Russia controlled 20% of Ukrainian territory, equivalent to almost 125,000 square kilometres.

=== 3 June ===
Serhiy Haidai stated that Ukrainian troops engaged in a block-by-block fight for Sievierodonetsk and managed to push back Russian forces by 20%.

=== 4 June ===
Alexander Bogomaz, the Governor of Russia's Bryansk Oblast, said that Ukrainian forces carried out strikes on a village.

Russia claimed to have shot down a Ukrainian military transport plane carrying weapons and munitions near Odesa.

Zelenskyy claimed that Russian artillery hit Sviatohirsk Lavra, an early 17th-century Ukrainian Orthodox monastery in Donetsk Oblast, engulfing its main church in flames. Russia denied involvement and accused Ukrainian troops of setting fire to the monastery before pulling back.

A private airfield in Kharkiv Oblast was reportedly hit by a missile strike, damaging planes and destroying several hangars.

Putin did an interview on the Rossiya-1 TV channel. He was asked about possible "deliveries of long-range missiles to Kyiv". He replied, "If they are supplied, we will draw appropriate conclusions from this and use our own weapons, of which we have enough, in order to strike at those facilities we are not targeting yet." He also commented on the supplies of M270 MLRS and M142 HIMARS, saying, "We understand that this supply [of advance rocket systems] from the United States and some other countries is meant to make up for the losses of this military equipment. This is nothing new. It doesn't change anything in essence." Putin further stated that Russia was finding Ukrainian weapons and "cracking them like nuts".

Ukraine said that a Russian missile flew "critically low" over a large nuclear power plant.

=== 5 June ===
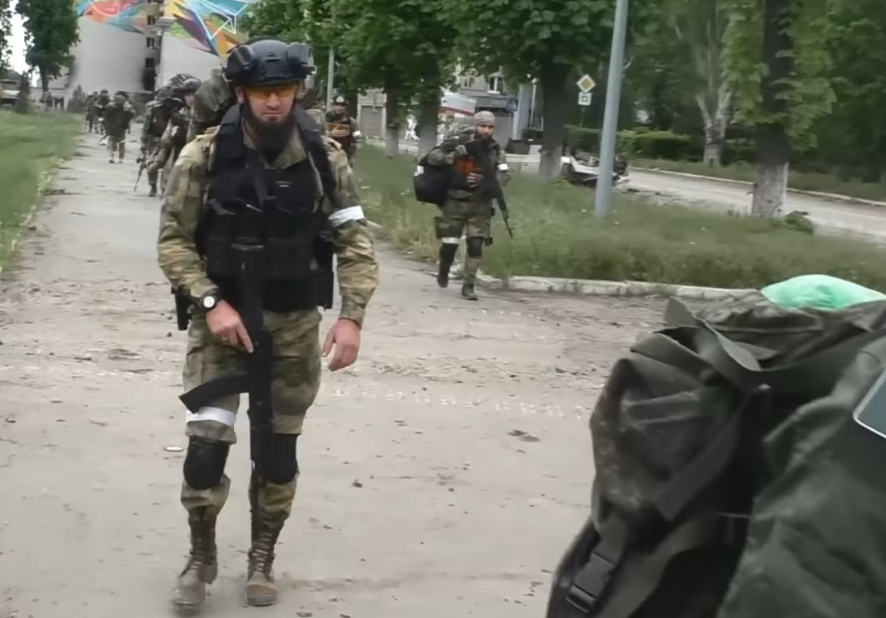
Chechen troops during the battle of the Donbas, June 2022

Ukraine said that it had killed the commander of the 29th Combined Arms Army, Lieutenant General Roman Berdnikov. Additionally, the death of Major General Roman Kutuzov was confirmed by Russian state television.

=== 6 June ===
The Ukrainian Army stated that it had pushed back Russia's Black Sea Fleet to a distance of more than 100 kilometres from Ukraine's Black Sea Coast.

=== 7 June ===
The website of the Russian Ministry of Construction, Housing and Utilities was hacked. Attempts to open the website through an internet search led to a "Glory to Ukraine" sign in Ukrainian.

=== 8 June ===
Mayoral aide Petro Andryushchenko said up to 100 bodies found in the ruins of high-rise buildings in Mariupol were transported to morgues and landfills, according to The Associated Press. He described the removal of the bodies as an "endless caravan of death" in a post on Telegram.

The Chief Rabbi of Moscow, Pinchas Goldschmidt, fled Russia after refusing to publicly support the war in Ukraine.

=== 9 June ===
Serhiy Haidai said that Russian forces controlled most of Sievierodonetsk, with Ukrainians holding ground in its industrial zone.

=== 10 June ===
Russian Airborne Forces fire artillery in Ukraine. Video released by the Russian Ministry of Defence.

Ukraine stated that it had nearly exhausted its supplies of artillery ammunition, using 5,000-6,000 rounds daily, and was now reliant on the West to resupply them. It also said was losing 100-200 soldiers per day, and that Russia fired 60,000 rounds and rockets daily. Ukrainian Intelligence stated that Russia had pulled out of storage T-62 tanks, 152 mm artillery pieces, landmines from the 1950s and other "MLRS" systems.

Ukrainian forces struck a Wagner base in Kadiivka, reportedly killing between 60 and 300 mercenaries, with Luhansk Oblast’s military governor Serhiy Haidai claiming that only one mercenary survived. LPR officials acknowledged the strike, initially claiming only two killed and four wounded, later claiming that the death toll rose to 22.

President Putin gave a speech on Peter the Great in Saint Petersburg, during which he said: "What was he doing? Taking back and reinforcing. That's what he did. And it looks like it fell on us to take back and reinforce as well."

Dmytro Zhyvytsky, the Governor of Sumy Oblast, said that Russian troops struck villages with kamikaze drones and a quadcopter. He stated that no one was injured and a house was damaged.

According to a Russian news outlet, Ukrainian forces sank their own anti-submarine corvette Vinnytsia.

=== 11 June ===
President Zelenskyy said that Ukraine had launched airstrikes in Russian-occupied Kherson.

Ukraine also stated that a flamethrower was used by Russian forces in the village of Vrubivka.

The British Ministry of Defense stated that Russia was using anti-ship missiles, like the Kh-22, against ground targets, adding that such missiles were "highly inaccurate" and could cause "severe collateral damage and casualties."

Local officials claimed that the first Russian passports had been handed out to residents in Kherson and Zaporizhzhia Oblasts.

=== 12 June ===
The Russian Defence Ministry stated that it used Kalibr cruise missiles to destroy a large depot with Western weapons in Ternopil Oblast. It also claimed to have shot down three Ukrainian Su-25s near Donetsk and Kharkiv.

=== 13 June ===
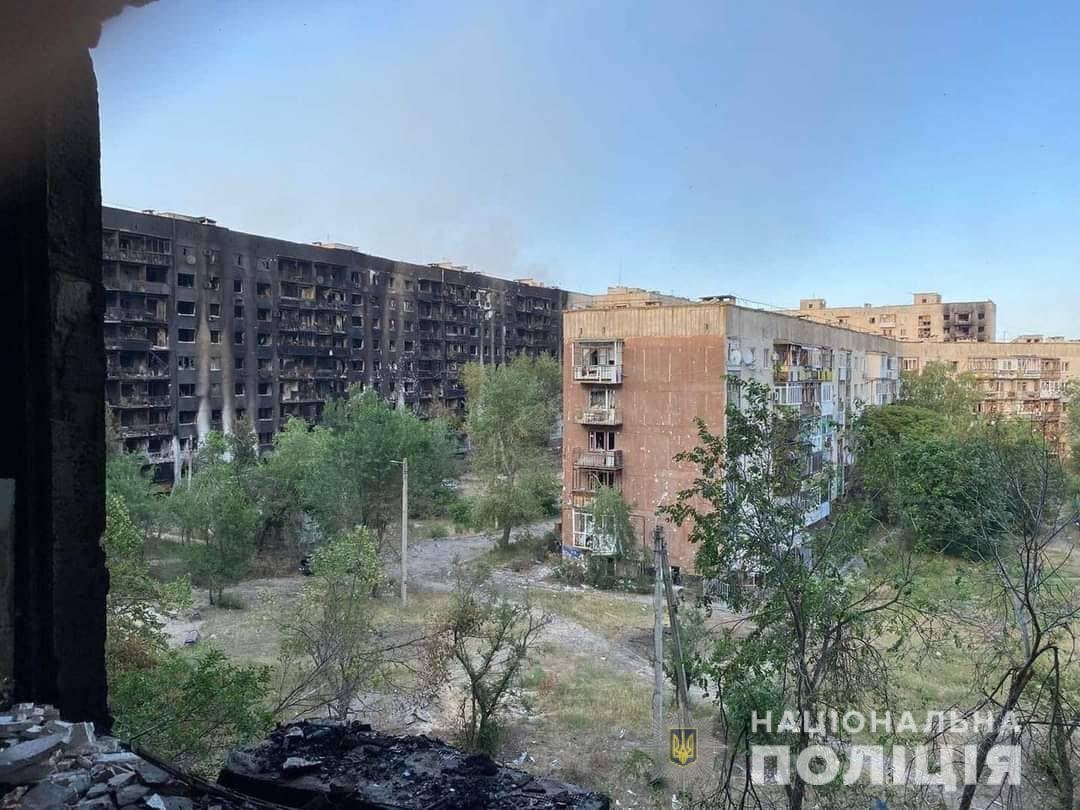
Scorched residential area in Luhansk Oblast on 13 June

Serhiy Haidai stated that the last of the three bridges connecting Sievierodonetsk to the rest of Ukraine had been destroyed. He said that the residents left in the city were facing "extremely difficult conditions". He further added that Russian forces controlled 80% of the city.

=== 14 June ===
Russian-backed separatists said that five were killed and twenty-two were wounded as a result of the Ukrainian shelling of Donetsk.

=== 15 June ===
Mikhail Mizintsev, head of Russia's National Defense Management Center, asked Ukrainian forces holed up in the Azot chemical plant in Sievierodonetsk to lay down their arms at 8:00 am Moscow time (0500 GMT). He added that civilians present in the plant would be let out through a humanitarian corridor.

Russia's military claimed to have destroyed an ammunition depot in Donetsk Oblast and an air control radar station in Lysychansk. It also said that it had killed 300 Ukrainian soldiers as a result of fierce fighting.

Ukrainian forces reportedly made gains in Kherson Oblast.

=== 16 June ===
Ukraine stated that it had sunk the Russian tug Spasatel Vasily Bekh with two Harpoon missiles.

=== 17 June ===
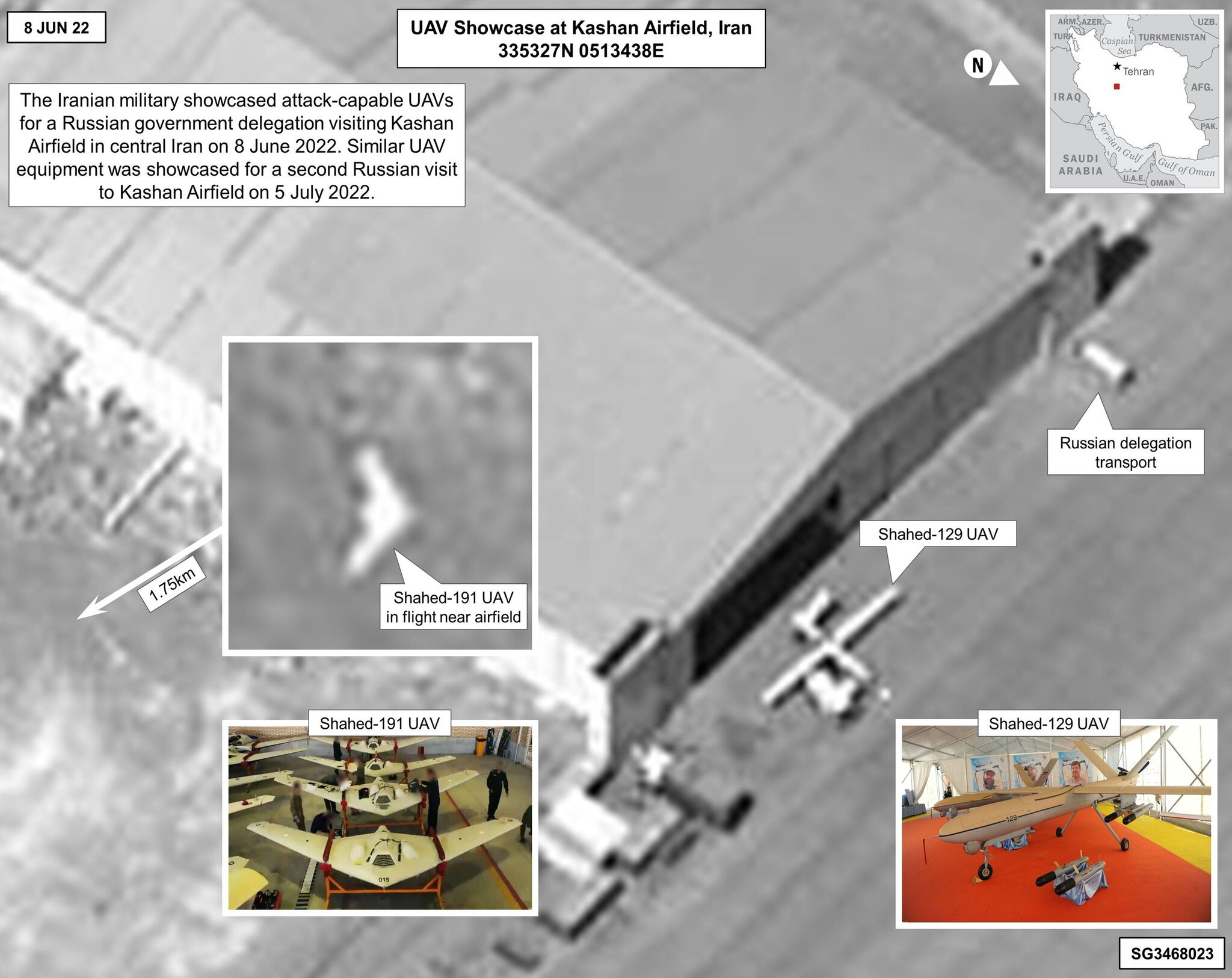
Russian delegation reportedly viewing Iranian drones, including the Shahed 129 and the Shahed Saegheh, at Kashan Airfield earlier in June 2022

Admiral Sir Tony Radakin, Chief of the UK Defence Staff, said, "President Putin has used about 25% of his army's power to gain a tiny amount of territory and 50,000 people either dead or injured. Russia is failing."

President Putin spoke to investors at an economic forum in St. Petersburg about economic sanctions, saying "the economic blitzkrieg against Russia had no chance of succeeding from the very beginning". He further said that they would hurt those imposing them more than Russia, calling them "mad and thoughtless". He said to the Russian investors, "Invest here. It's safer in your own house. Those who didn't want to listen to this have lost millions abroad."

Ukrainian Commander of the Land Forces Logistics Volodymyr Karpenko stated that the Ukrainian Army had lost between 30% and 50% of their heavy equipment.

=== 18 June ===
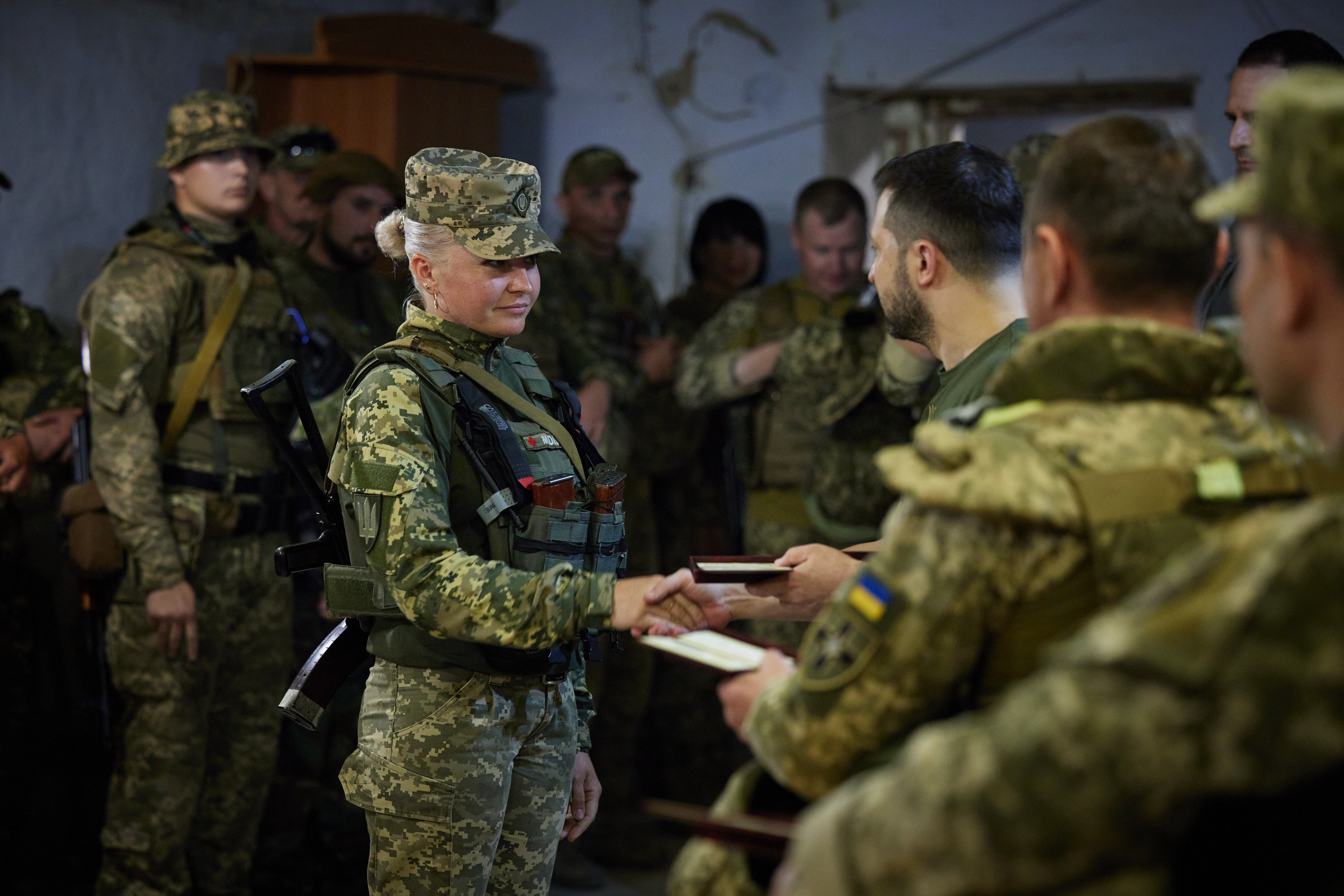
President Zelenskyy on working trip to Mykolaiv and Odesa Oblasts

The US said that it was considering doubling the number of HIMARS systems being supplied to Ukraine. Ukraine also requested long-range rockets that the HIMARS is capable of launching.

Valentyn Reznichenko, the head of the regional administration of Novomoskovsk, said that 3 Russian missiles destroyed a fuel storage depot in the town.

The Australian government said the first 4 of 14 M113AS4s it donated to Ukraine had been loaded onto a Ukrainian An-24 in the past week.

=== 19 June ===
The Russian Ministry of Defence claimed to have hit a command post near Dnipro with multiple Kalibr missiles and eliminated "over 50 generals and officers of Ukrainian military".

Russian officials complained about Lithuanian restrictions on transport of rail goods between Russia and Kaliningrad. Konstantin Kosachev wrote on Telegram, "As an EU member state, Lithuania is violating a whole series of legally binding international legal acts." He also said this "incipient blockade" was affecting 40-50% of all rail goods.

The New York Times examined Russian weapons used in Ukraine and said that more than 210 of them were banned under various international treaties. It added that the majority of weapons used by Russian forces were unguided.

=== 20 June ===
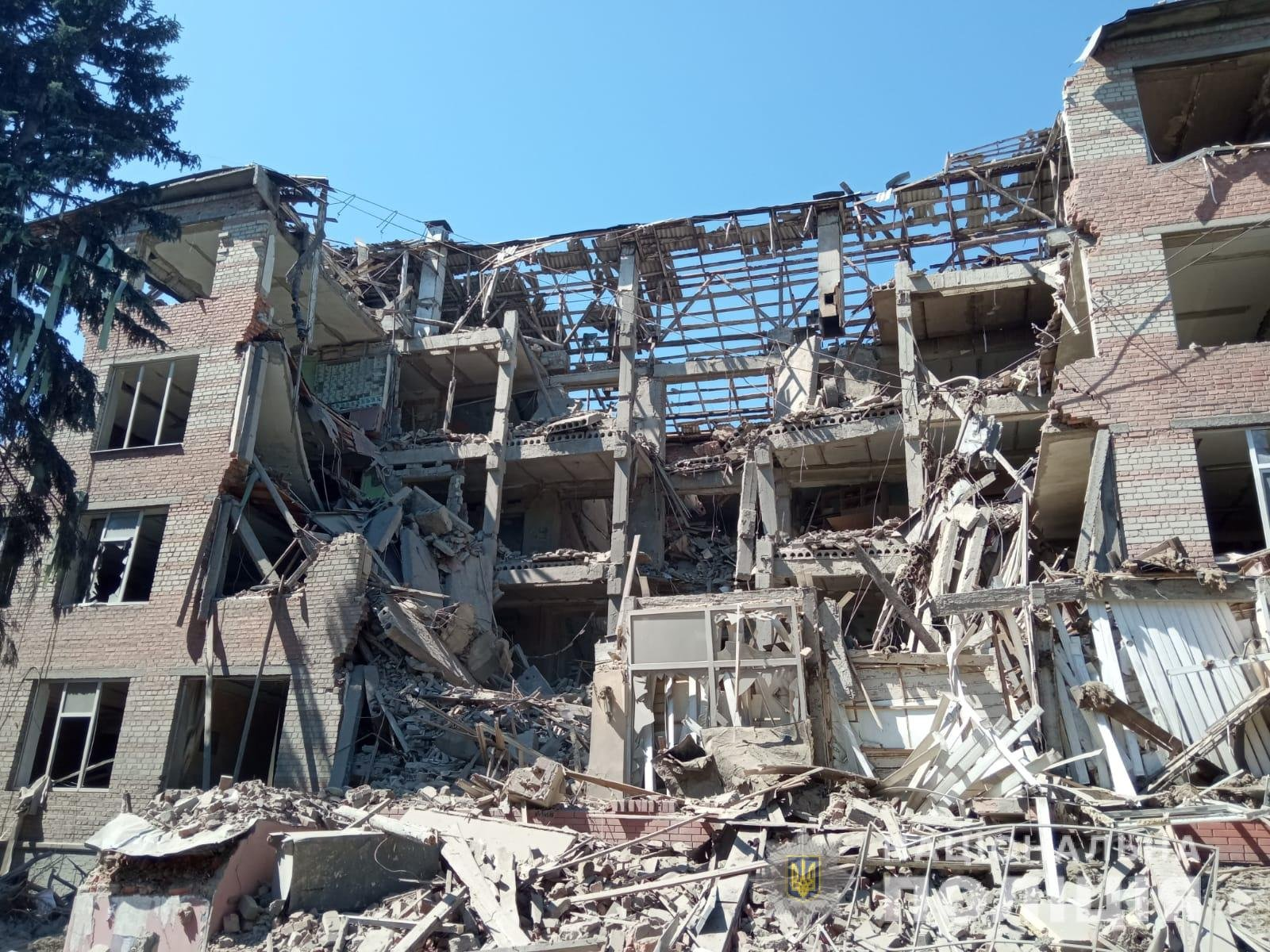
Housing and Communal College in Kharkiv destroyed by rocket strike on 20 June

Serhiy Haidai confirmed that Russian forces captured Metiolkine on Sievierodonetsk's eastern outskirts.

Josep Borrell, a diplomat at the EU, called Russia's blocking of grain a "real war crime".

In an address to the African Union, President Zelenskyy said that Africa was "a hostage" due to the blockage of grain.

=== 21 June ===
Russia summoned the EU ambassador in Moscow over Lithuania's ban on some goods going to Kaliningrad from the Russian mainland by rail. The Russian foreign ministry said that the country reserved the "right to take actions to protect its national interests", calling it "unprecedented" and "illegal". Lithuanian foreign minister Gabrielius Landsbergis said that the restrictions were in accordance with sanctions imposed by the European Commission.

Russia took control of Toshkivka. Twelve Panzerhaubitze 2000 were deployed to Ukraine, seven from Germany and five from the Netherlands. The Donetsk People's Republic's militia had lost 55% of its force during the fighting in the Donbas according to the UK MoD. The DPR ombudsman said that 2,128 fighters had been killed, 8,897 wounded, and 654 civilians had been killed. Ukrainian intelligence stated that since Russia had stopped sending conscripts they were relying on local fighters in what UK intelligence called "extraordinary attrition".

=== 22 June ===
Two drones flying from the direction of Ukraine hit a major Russian oil refinery near the border on Novoshakhtinsk.

At an indefinite point in early summer, the Ukrainian army completely used up the last of its older Soviet heavy artillery munitions, and the related guns fell silent for a few days.

=== 23 June ===
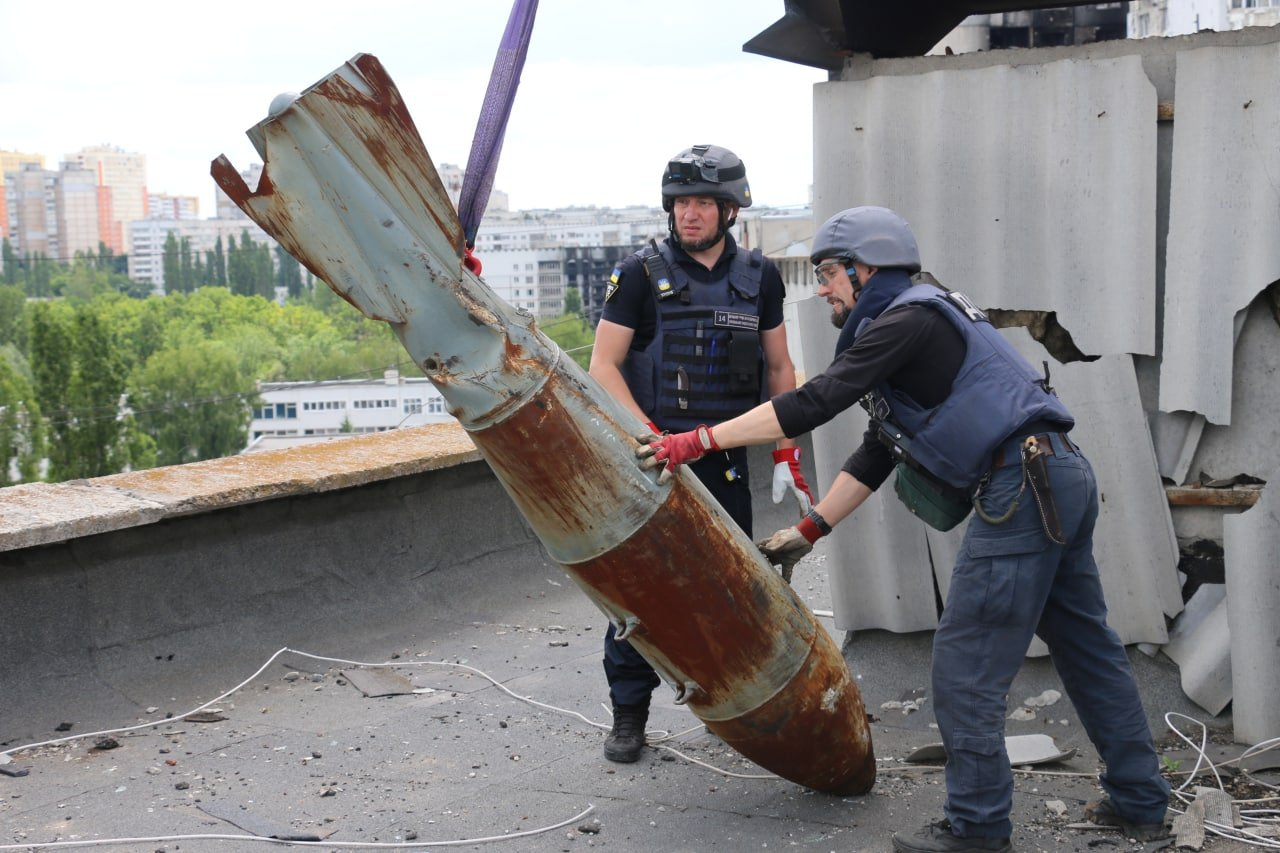
Removal of an unexploded air-dropped Russian FAB-500 bomb, which pierced the roof of a 9-storey residential building in Kharkiv

Russian troops surrounded Ukrainian troops in the settlements of Zolote and Hirske.

=== 24 June ===
Ukrainian forces were ordered to withdraw from Sievierodonetsk according to Serhiy Haidai: "Remaining in positions that have been relentlessly shelled for months just doesn't make sense. They have received orders to retreat to new positions... and from there continue their operations. There is no point in staying in positions which have been destroyed over several months just for the sake of staying". The head of the Hirske Community Oleksiy Babchenko announced that the whole city is under Russian control. The Russian Ministry of Defence said that they have encircled 2,000 Ukrainian soldiers in the Zolote/Hirske cauldron.

=== 25 June ===
Ukraine started deploying the HIMARS. According to Ukraine's General Staff, artillerymen "skillfully hit certain targets" on Ukrainian territory.

The Ukrainian military said that during this strike over 40 soldiers were killed, including Colonel Andrei Vasilyev. The strike occurred on a Russian military base near Izyum. Russia acknowledged the attack but said it hit a hospital and killed 2 civilians.

=== 26 June ===
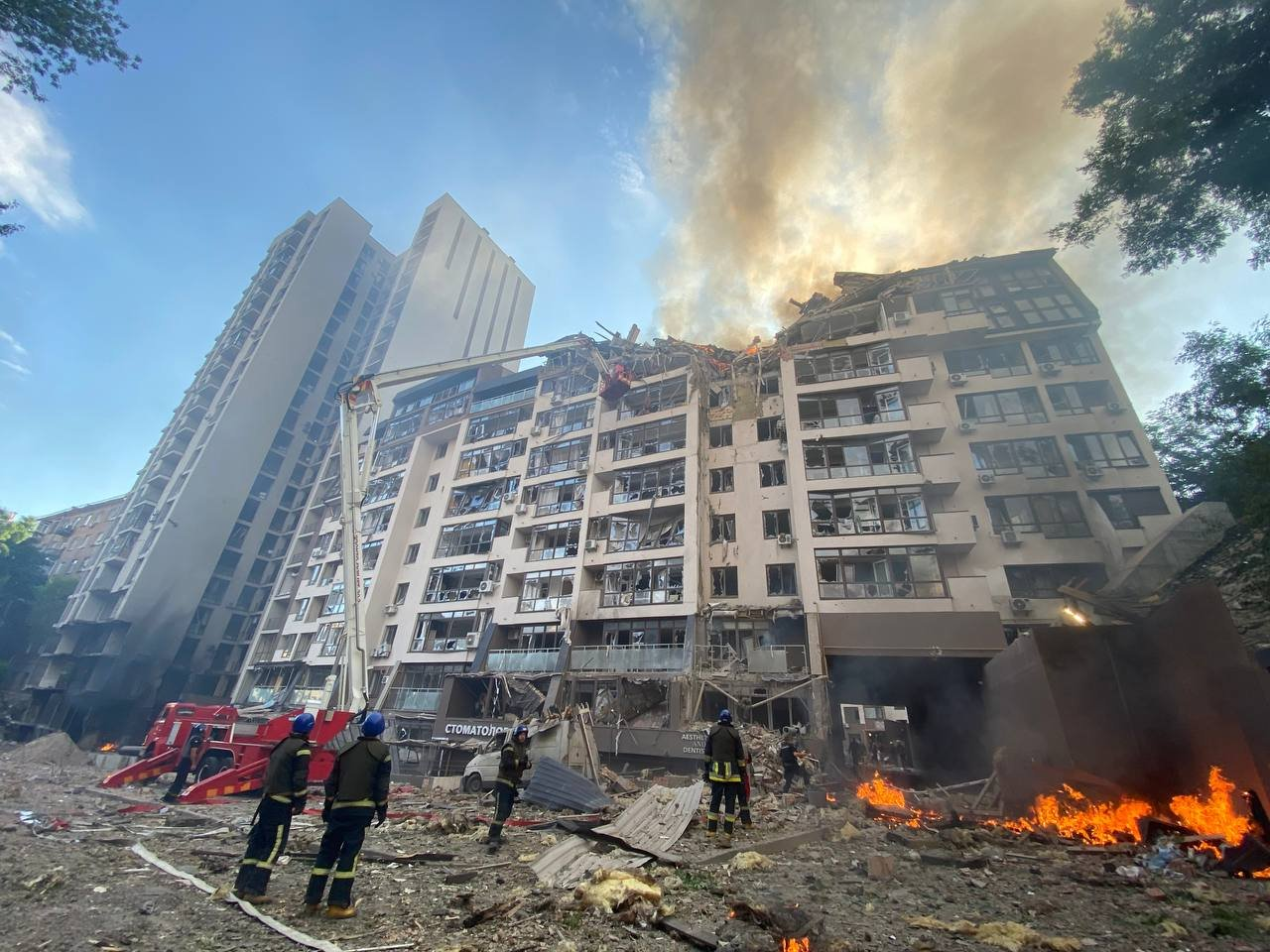
Apartment complex in Kyiv after the strike

Russia fired 14 missiles on Kyiv, some of them being X101 missiles fired from Tu-95 and Tu-160 bombers over the Caspian Sea, damaging residential buildings and a kindergarten. The strikes were the first strikes on Kyiv in three weeks, and killed one person and injured six others. According to "a source familiar with the matter", the U.S. was going to announce a medium to long air defence system for Ukraine, which the U.S. will purchase for Ukraine. The suggested system was NASAMS which would require more training for Ukrainian users. The aid package would also include more Javelin missiles, radars for counter-battery, air defence and artillery ammunition. No drones were to be sent due to concerns over their vulnerable nature and valuable technology.

=== 27 June ===
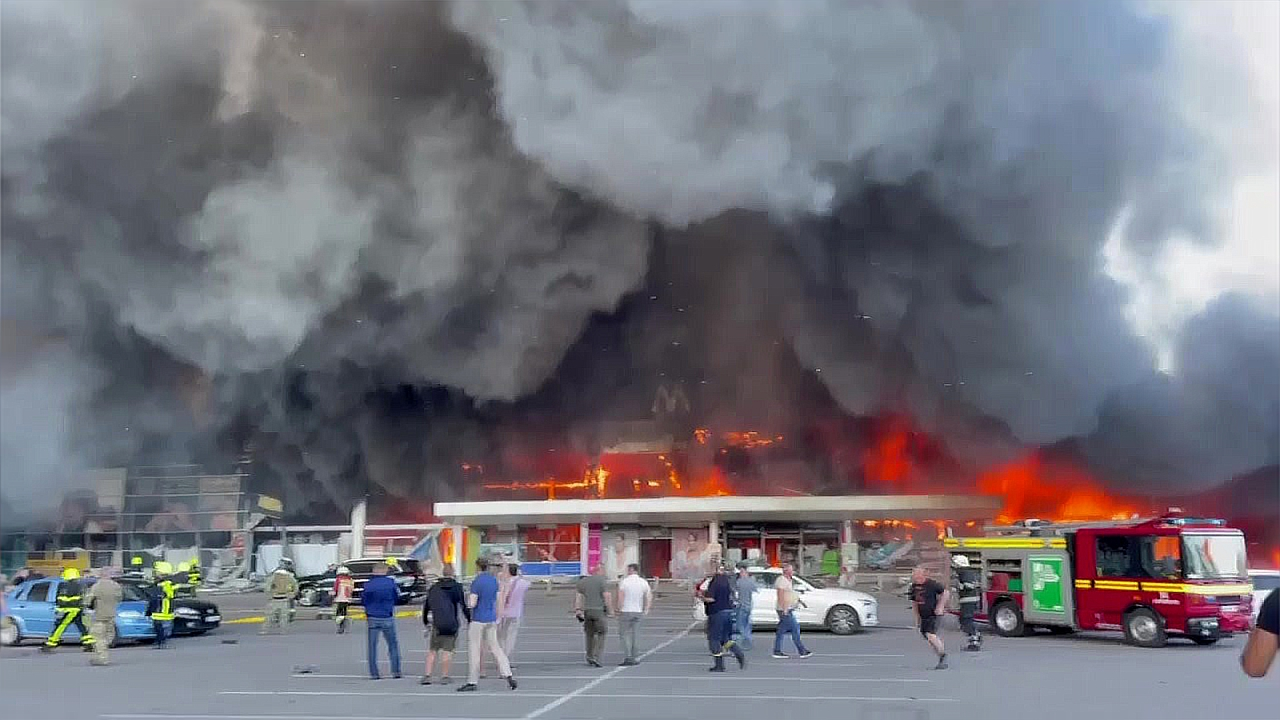
Shopping centre in Kremenchuk after the strike

Russia launched missiles at a shopping centre in Kremenchuk with more than 1,000 people inside, killing at least 20 people. Russia reportedly denied hitting the shopping mall. President Zelenskyy called the attack a "calculated Russian strike."

=== 28 June ===
The Luhansk People's Republic Ambassador to Russia, Rodion Miroshnik, stated that Ukrainian forces began withdrawing from Lysychansk, continuing a fighting retreat towards strongholds in Siversk, Kramatorsk, and Sloviansk.

Russian forces continued to shell Kharkiv and nearby settlements and launched unsuccessful operations in northwestern Kharkiv oblast, likely in order to prevent Ukrainian forces from reaching the Russia-Ukraine border, and to defend its positions near Izyum.

Ukrainian forces reportedly recaptured the settlements of Zelenyi Hai and Barvinok north of Kherson.

=== 29 June ===
Russian troops withdrew from Snake Island overnight, allowing the Ukrainian army to recapture it in the morning. Syria recognized the independence of the Donetsk and Luhansk People's Republics.

=== 30 June ===
The lower house of the State Duma passed new laws allowing the Russian prosecutor-general to shut down foreign media from countries that have banned Russian media, due to bans on Russian media over the war in Ukraine.

== July 2022 ==
=== 1 July ===
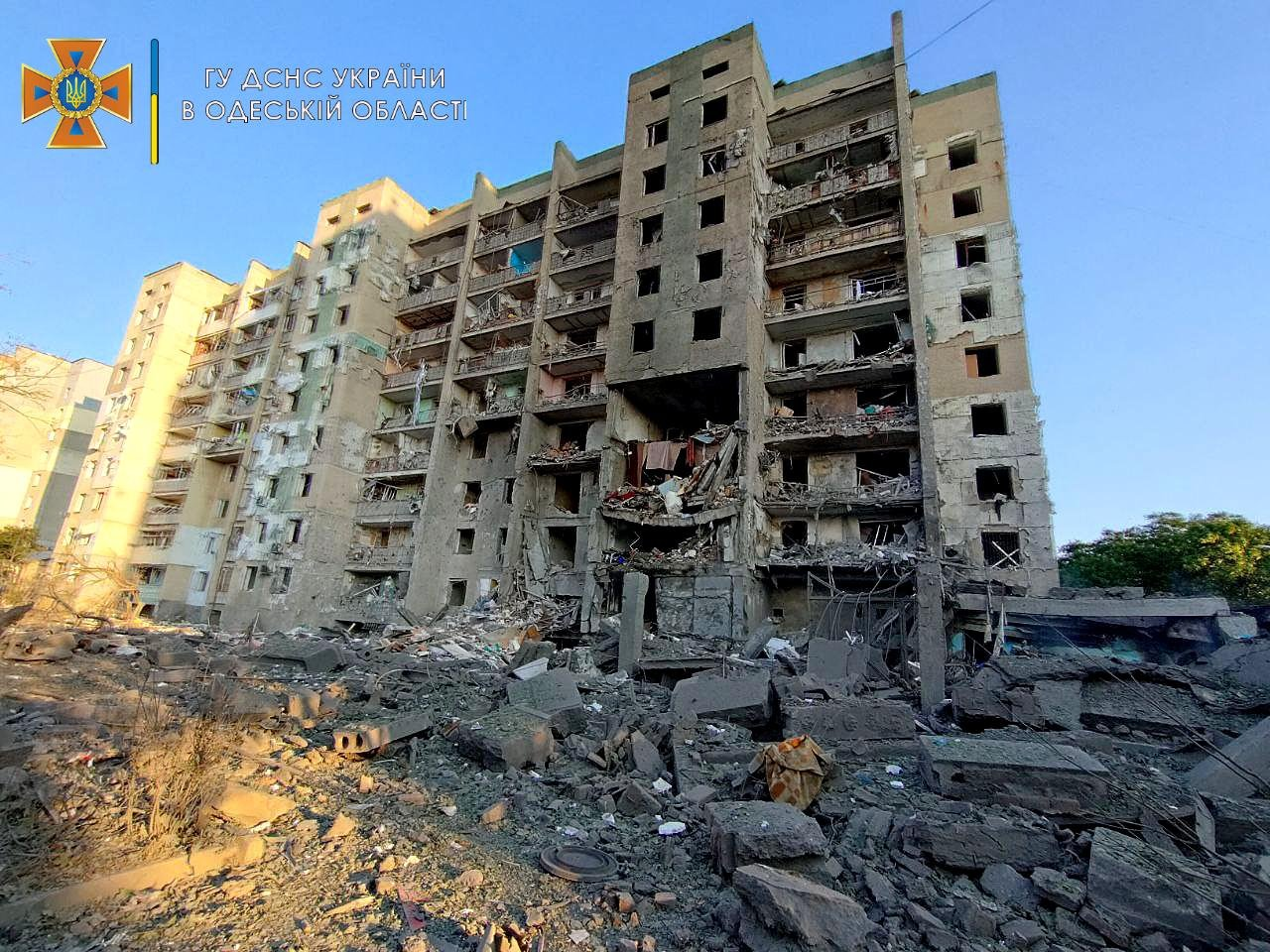
An apartment building in Serhiivka after the strike

The Russian army fired three missiles on the Serhiivka settlement in Odesa Oblast, destroying a residential building and a recreation center. At least 21 people were killed.

The United States government announced its 14th aid package for Ukraine, worth $820 million in total, including additional ammunition for High Mobility Artillery Rocket Systems (HIMARS), two National Advanced Surface-to-Air Missile Systems (NASAMS), 150,000 rounds of 155 mm artillery ammunition and four additional counter-artillery radars.

The Ukrainian army said Russian Su-30 jets conducted two strikes with phosphorus bombs on Snake Island.

=== 2 July ===
Two Britons, Andrew Hill and Dylan Healy, were charged by the Donetsk People's Republic as being mercenaries, the same charge that two other Britons, Shaun Pinner and Aiden Aslin, were convicted of in June and sentenced to death for.

Russia claimed to have destroyed five Ukrainian command posts in the Donbas and Mykolaiv Oblast.

Rob Lee, a defence blogger, tweeted a video of Chechen Rosgvardia soldiers outside the administration building in Lysychansk. Furthermore, the Russian forces tweeted a video of a Soviet flag in the ruins of the same building. Ukraine maintained that it was in control of the city. However, its forces were "enduring intense Russian shelling".

Ukrainian partisans reportedly derailed a Russian armored train carrying ammunition near Melitopol.

=== 3 July ===
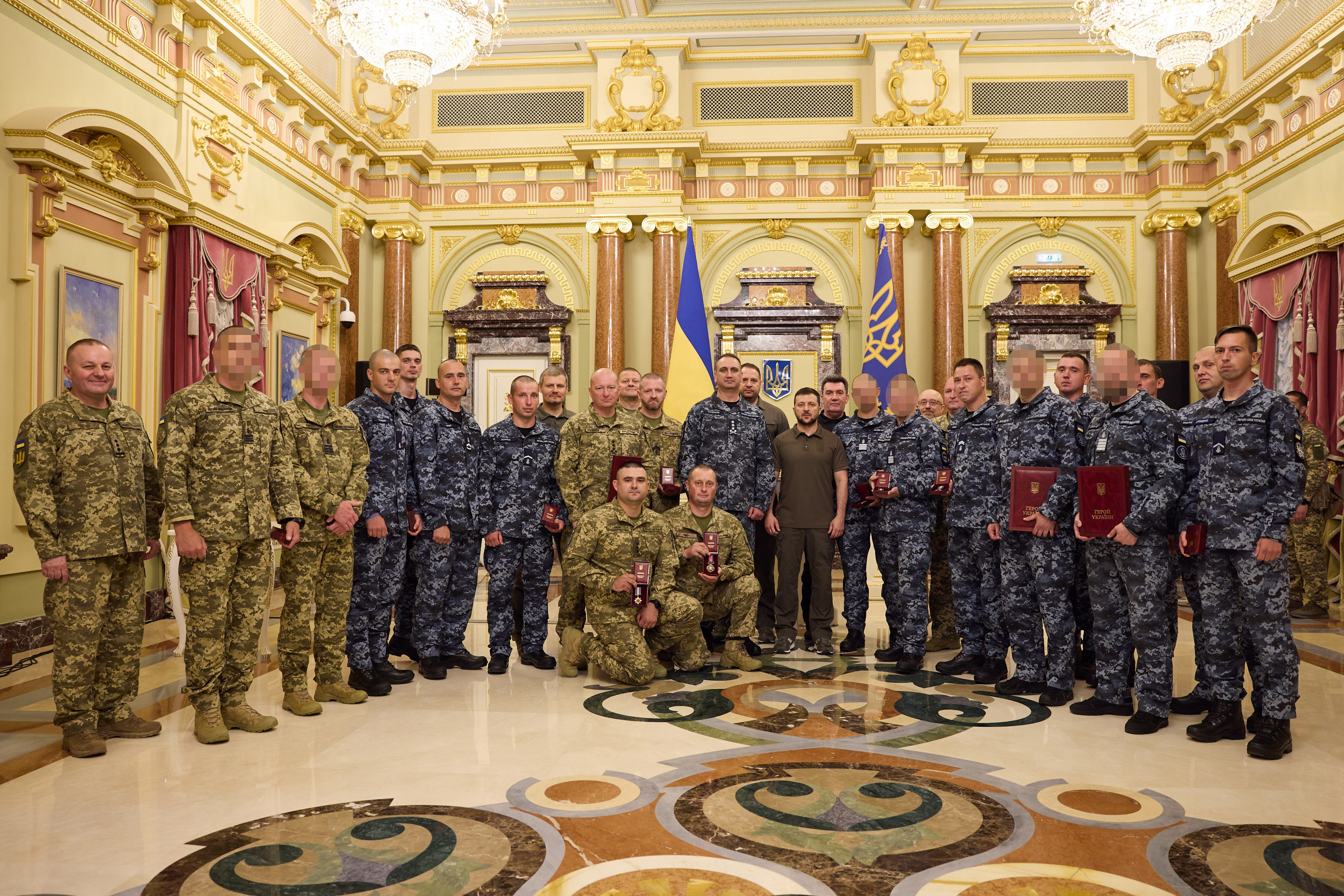
President Volodymyr Zelenskyy with servicemen on Navy Day 2022

In Russia, three people were killed by Ukrainian shelling in Belgorod, according to the local governor Vyacheslav Gladkov, who also said that 11 apartment buildings and 39 private residences were destroyed. The claims could not be independently verified. The governor of Kursk Oblast wrote on Telegram that their "air defenses shot down two Ukrainian Strizh drones". In Russian-occupied parts of Ukraine, mainly Kherson, there were three assassination attempts on pro-Russian officials over the last two weeks, thought to have been carried out by loosely organized resistance fighters.

UK and New Zealand soldiers began training Ukrainian soldiers to use the L118 howitzer and the M270 MLRS. The number of Ukrainian soldiers trained was listed as "hundreds", and occurred in Wiltshire, England.

President Zelenskyy acknowledged the loss of Luhansk Oblast, saying: "If the commanders of our army withdraw people from certain points at the front, where the enemy has the greatest advantage in firepower, and this also applies to Lysychansk, it means only one thing. That we will return thanks to our tactics, thanks to the increase in the supply of modern weapons." The Ukrainian army said in a statement about the withdrawal from Lysychansk: "The continuation of the defence of the city would lead to fatal consequences. In order to preserve the lives of Ukrainian defenders, a decision was made to withdraw." Sergei Shoigu, the Russian Defence Minister, informed President Putin that all of Luhansk Oblast had been "liberated".

Australian Prime Minister Anthony Albanese visited Kyiv and promised sanctions against Russia over its invasion, banning imports of Russian gold, and imposing sanctions and travel bans on 16 senior politicians and oligarchs. Military assistance would include 14 M113 APCs, 20 more Bushmaster Protected Mobility Vehicles, and other military equipment. This would bring the total to 88 vehicles given to Ukraine by Australia: 60 Bushmasters and 28 M113 APCs.

=== 4 July ===
The governor of Luhansk Oblast, Serhiy Haidai, said Russian forces fighting in Luhansk were "not taking all their wounded with them" due to the heavy fighting; he also said "the hospitals are full to bursting – as are the morgues." President Putin said that Russian forces "that took part in active hostilities and achieved success, victory ... should rest, increase their combat capabilities."

=== 5 July ===
Russia's State Duma started preparing legislation to convert to a war economy to be able to order companies to produce war supplies and make workers work overtime.

According to the United States, Russia sought to acquire military drones from Iran, reporting that a Russian delegation visited Kashan Airfield, south of Tehran, earlier in June and on 5 July 2022 to observe drones manufactured by Iran. Iran disputed the assessment by the United States, saying that it would not supply Russia or Ukraine with military equipment during the war, instead demanding that both nations seek a peaceful resolution.

=== 6 July ===
Igor Konashenkov, the Russian defence ministry's chief spokesman, said that Russian air-launched high precision missiles had destroyed two U.S.-supplied HIMARS systems in Ukraine. The Ukrainian military denied the claim, calling it "nothing more than a fake". The Russian military released video allegedly showing the attack, but it could not be independently verified.

Former Russian President Dmitry Medvedev wrote on Telegram that "it would be crazy to create tribunals or courts for the so-called investigation of Russia's actions [...] These proposals are not only legally void. The idea of punishing a country that has one of the largest nuclear potentials is absurd in itself. And potentially poses a threat to the existence of humanity. [...] America brings chaos and devastation around the world under the guise of 'true democracy'". He further criticized the United States over various issues including the treatment of Native Americans, dropping atomic weapons on Japan and being a part of wars in Syria, Iraq and Afghanistan. "The US and its useless stooges should remember the words of the Bible: 'Judge not, lest you be judged; so that one day the great day of His wrath will not come to their house, and who can stand?'" concluded Medvedev.

=== 7 July ===
President Zelenskyy said of Western artillery: "This significantly reduces the offensive potential of the Russian army. The losses of the occupiers will only increase every week, as will the difficulty of supplying them." Russian forces appeared to be recruiting veteran soldiers and conscripts more intensely, offering them contracts to serve as professional soldiers in the army for a limited time. In Chechnya, there were reports of people being kidnapped and forced to fight in Ukraine. A report by IStories indicated that the brigades hardest hit by the war in Ukraine have started advertising online for soldiers, recruiting unemployed people, sometimes without any training.

General Igor Konashenkov confirmed that Russian forces had paused to rest and regain their combat capabilities. Though minor ground offensives and continuous shelling and bombing across Ukraine still continued, the majority of the Russian forces were thought to have begun to fortify positions and resupply troops for another major offensive in the coming weeks or months.

President Putin said to parliamentary leaders: "Today we hear that they want to defeat us on the battlefield. What can you say, let them try. We have heard many times that the West wants to fight us to the last Ukrainian. This is a tragedy for the Ukrainian people, but it seems that everything is heading towards this. Everyone should know that, by and large, we haven't started anything yet in earnest. At the same time, we don't reject peace talks. But those who reject them should know that the further it goes, the harder it will be for them to negotiate with us." Mykhailo Podolyak, the Ukrainian chief negotiator, wrote on Twitter in response: "There is no 'collective West' plan. Only a specific z-army which entered sovereign Ukraine, shelling cities and killing civilians. Everything else is a primitive propaganda. That's why Mr. Putin's mantra of the 'war to the last Ukrainian' is yet another proof of deliberate Russian genocide."

=== 8 July ===
Russia's ambassador to Britain, Andrey Kelin, said during a media interview that Russian and pro-Russian forces were unlikely to withdraw from southern Ukraine as part of any future peace negotiations. He also vowed that Russia would "liberate" the Donbas, and said that further Russian escalation in the war was possible if the flow of Western weapons into Ukraine "was organised in such a way that it endangers our strategic situation, our defense...."

Alexei Gorinov, a Moscow City Councilor, was sentenced to 7 years in prison after he made anti-war comments during a children's drawing contest in the Krasnoselsky district. On 15 March he was filmed saying: "How can we talk about any Children's Day drawing contests [...] when we have children dying every day in Ukraine?" During his trial Gorinov held up a placard saying: "Do you still need this war?". Afterwards he said: "They took away my spring, they took away my summer, and now they've taken away seven more years of my life." Russian lawyer Pavel Chikov noted on Telegram that so far only two individuals had been convicted under this law: one with a fine, and another a suspended sentence as punishment.

Ukrainian presidential advisor Mykhailo Podolyak said that 37,000 Russian soldiers had been killed, and another 98,000-117,000 people had been wounded, including 10 generals. He also said that 1,605 Russian tanks had been destroyed, along with 405 planes and helicopters. This was one of the few times that Ukrainian sources had commented on the total number of Russian forces wounded.

The governor of the Mykolaiv Oblast, Vitaly Kim, claimed that Russia had been using the surface-to-air S-300 missile system in a surface-to-surface capacity. He also claimed that some 12 missiles were fired after being retrofitted with GPS guidance, yet remained inaccurate. However, this was not independently verified.

=== 9 July ===
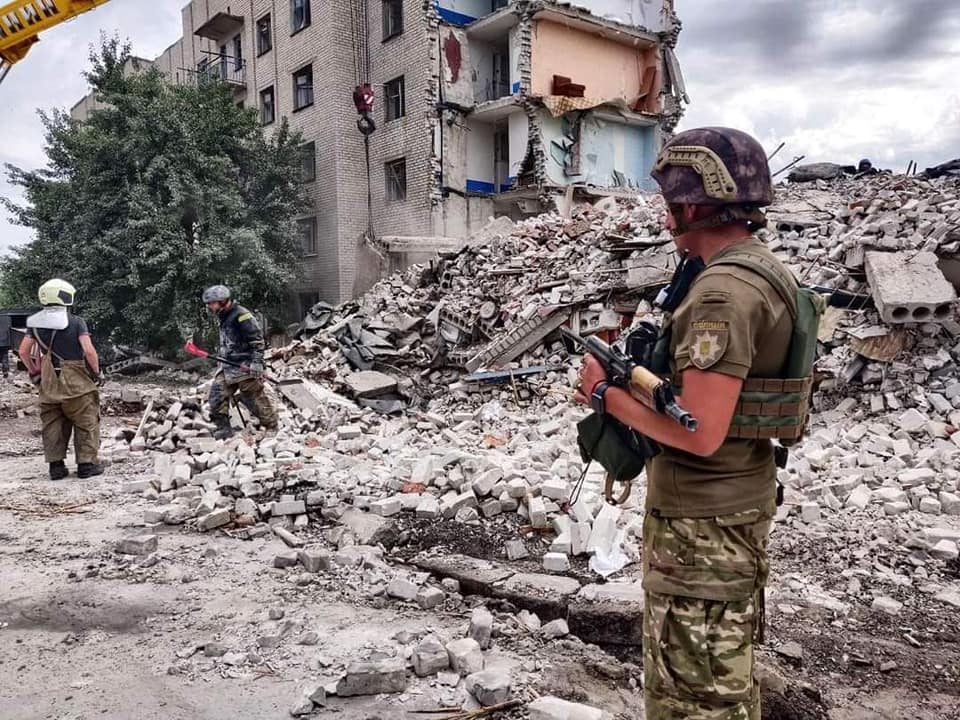
Aftermath of the Chasiv Yar rocket attack on 9 July 2022

Rockets fired by Russian forces struck an apartment building in Chasiv Yar, killing at least 48 people.

Ukrainian artillerymen from the 24th Separate Mechanized Brigade attacked and destroyed a column of over a dozen Russian tanks and BMPs in Luhansk Oblast.

=== 10 July ===
Iryna Vereshchuk, the Deputy Prime Minister of Ukraine and the Minister of Reintegration of Temporarily Occupied Territories, urged Ukrainian refugees "waiting out the war" inside Russian territory to immediately return to Ukraine or evacuate to European Union countries, warning that an "iron curtain" was impeding their ability to flee. She claimed the Russians had already begun setting up "filtration camps" on its borders to Estonia to prevent Ukrainians from leaving Russia for the EU. She also reassured Ukrainian refugees in Russia that they would not be considered collaborators, and were entitled to government assistance.

Paul Urey, a British national being held by the Donetsk People's Republic (DPR), died while in custody. He was working as an aid worker when he was seized at a checkpoint near Zaporizhzhia on 25 April. He suffered from type 1 diabetes and needed insulin. The Human Rights Ombudsman of the DPR, Daria Morozova, said on social media that Urey had been suffering from "diabetes and respiratory, kidney and cardiovascular issues". She also commented: "On our part, despite the severity of the alleged crime, Paul Urey was provided with appropriate medical assistance. However, given the diagnoses and stress, he passed away on July 10." In August his body was handed over to Ukrainian authorities who described it as having signs of torture.

=== 11 July ===
Oleh Kotenko, the Ukrainian Ombudsman, claimed that 7,200 Ukrainian personnel had gone missing since the start of the war, revising a previous claim of 2,000 missing. He expressed hope that these personnel, which include "National Guard, border guards and the security service", could be returned to Ukraine through prisoner swaps with Russia.

In an interview, Ukrainian Defence Minister Oleksii Renikov noted plans to retake southern Ukraine with a "million-strong army", though analysts considered this more of a "rallying cry" than a concrete military plan.

The first NASAMS system for Ukraine arrived in Poland from Norway. It appeared to be a NASAMS II variant, and was delivered by a Ukrainian An-124.

The Russian-appointed head of Velykyi Burluk, Yevgeniy Yunakov, was killed by a car bomb, according to TASS.

=== 12 July ===
President Zelenskyy said that Ukraine had become an associate member of NATO's Multilateral Interoperability Program, allowing it to not only implement NATO standards, but also contribute to the development of new standards. He claimed that this was a "contribution to the development of collective security in Europe". He also said of Western-supplied artillery: "The occupiers have already felt very well what modern artillery is[...]. Russian soldiers – and we know this from interceptions of their conversations – are truly afraid of our Armed Forces." He however acknowledged Ukrainian losses: "There are victims – wounded and killed. In Donbas, offensive attempts do not stop, the situation there does not get easier, and the losses do not get smaller."

The spokesman for Odesa Oblast claimed that the chief of staff of Russia's 22nd Army Corps, Major General Artyom Nasbulin, was killed during a strike near Kherson by a HIMARS rocket. Ukraine also claimed the death of some five Colonels in the same strike. Russia confirmed the attack, but denied the death of the officers, claiming that the rocket hit a warehouse that contained chemicals, which then exploded.

=== 13 July ===
North Korea recognised the independence of the Donetsk and Luhansk People's Republics, prompting Ukraine to introduce sanctions against the North Korean government.

The interior ministry of the Luhansk People's Republic reported that their troops and Russian troops had entered Siversk.

=== 14 July ===
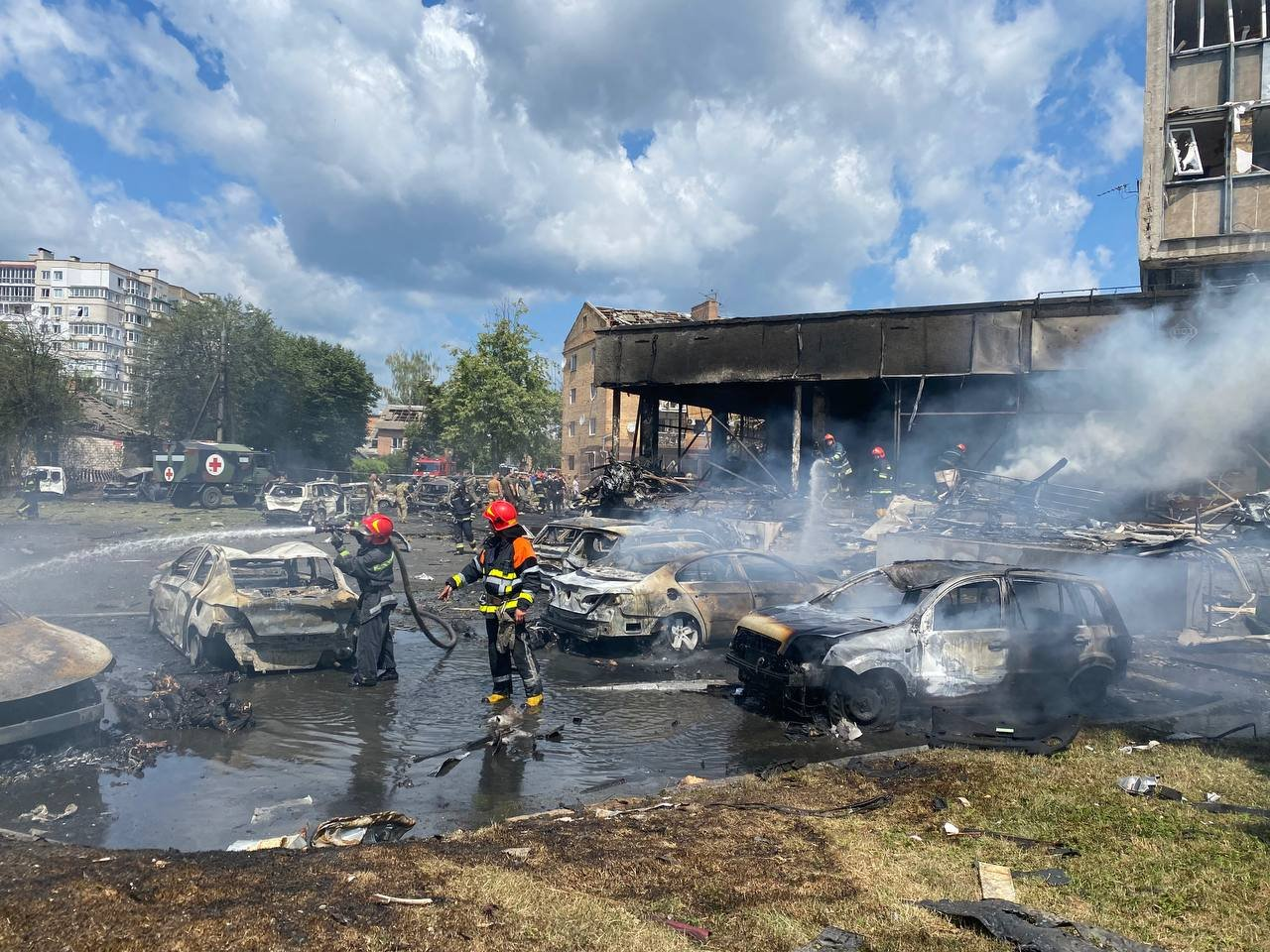
Aftermath of the 14 July Vinnytsia missile strike

A Russian missile strike in Vinnytsia killed 26 people, including a woman and seriously wounded her 11-year-old son.

Russia started a "volunteer mobilisation": by the end of the month, 85 federal areas, including Crimea and Sevastopol, were expected to recruit 400 men each. Those signing a six month contract were to receive "3,750 to 6,000 US dollars per month". Some regions also offered a bonus of US $3,400. The Wagner Group also started recruiting prisoners.

President Putin signed into force a number of laws including the recently announced "special economic measures", including forcing private companies to take government contracts, allowing the government to "temporarily reactivate mobilization capacities and facilities" while "unlocking state reserve material assets", and unilaterally change the work conditions of employees, such as increased operating hours.

=== 15 July ===
President Zelenskyy urged the international community to recognize Russia as a "terrorist state".

The US House of Representatives passed an amendment that set aside $100 million to train Ukrainian pilots on US fighter jets. Representative Adam Kinzinger said, "Last night the House passed my bipartisan Ukrainian Fighter Pilots Act, which authorizes the training of Ukrainian fighter pilots in the U.S. I urge the Senate to get this critical legislation to the President's desk. Slava Ukraini!"

Ukraine claimed that Russia was using the Zaporizhzhia Nuclear Power Station to store weapons, and as a base from which to fire them.

=== 16 July ===
During an inspection of troops at an unnamed "command post" in the Donbas, Russian defence minister Sergei Shoigu ordered troops to escalate buildup "in all operational directions" in Ukraine, suggesting that the Russian army was probably putting an end to the reported "operational pause" along front lines.

Mikhail Mizintsev, chief of Russia's national defence control centre, said during a briefing that over the last 24 hours, "28,424 people, including 5,148 children" had been evacuated from the Donbas and other parts of Ukraine to Russia. In total since 24 Feb, some "2,612,747 people, of which 412,553 are children" had been evacuated to Russia. Ukrainian authorities were not involved in these evacuations, and both US and Ukrainian officials regarded them as forcible deportations.

=== 17 July ===
The UK Chief of the Defence Staff, Admiral Sir Tony Radakin, said that the Russian army had suffered 50,000 soldiers killed or wounded, along with nearly 1,700 tanks and nearly 4,000 fighting vehicles, a loss of more than 30% of Russia's ground forces. He also stated that Russian soldiers were especially struggling with morale.

The Ukrainian President proposed to dismiss Ivan Bakanov, the Head of the Security Service of Ukraine, and the Prosecutor General of Ukraine Iryna Venediktova; up to 60 employees of both agencies were found to have been collaborating with Russia.

=== 18 July ===
President Zelenskyy said that Ukraine could inflict "significant losses" on Russian forces due to Western weapons. The commander of the Ukrainian Armed Forces, Valerii Zaluzhnyi, said: "An important factor contributing to our retention of defensive lines and positions is the timely arrival of M142 HIMARS, which deliver surgical strikes on enemy control posts, ammunition and fuel storage depots."

Russian forces reinforced their positions in southern Ukraine. The Ukrainian army claimed that Russian forces were now trying to hide "behind the civilian population".

President Putin acknowledged that international sanctions were causing a "colossal amount of difficulties" to Russia, but that completely cutting the country off in the modern world was "impossible". He said Russia would "competently look for new solutions".

Ukraine claimed to have repulsed multiple attacks by Russian forces in Donetsk Oblast.

The UK MoD said Russian forces were facing "a dilemma between deploying reserves to the Donbas or defending against Ukrainian counterattacks in the south-western Kherson sector".

=== 19 July ===
Alexander Bogomaz, governor of Russia's Bryansk Oblast, claimed that the village of Novye Yurkovichi was shelled from Ukraine; no casualties were reported.

The Verkhovna Rada voted to dismiss Prosecutor-General Iryna Venediktova and the Head of the Security Service of Ukraine Ivan Bakanov; other intelligence officials were also fired, including Bakanov's deputy.

The Antonivka Road Bridge was damaged by Ukrainian rocket fire.

=== 20 July ===
Syria formally broke off diplomatic ties with Ukraine.

In its 16th aid package the US government announced the supply of additional HIMARS systems, rockets and artillery shells to Ukraine.

According to Interfax, Russian officials claimed a second day of rocket attacks on the Antonivka Road Bridge. Some rockets were intercepted, but 11 rockets struck, seriously damaging but not closing it to traffic.

The US Chairman of the Joint Chiefs of Staff, General Mark Milley, estimated that Russian forces had gained 6–10 miles of territory over the last 90 days in the Donbas, with "tens of thousands of artillery rounds" fired every day and night. Former Ambassador to Russia and current head of the CIA, William J. Burns, said that Putin was "entirely too healthy" amid speculation over his health. Burns estimated Russian losses at nearly 15,000 killed and 45,000 wounded, while Ukraine's figure was "a little less".

=== 21 July ===
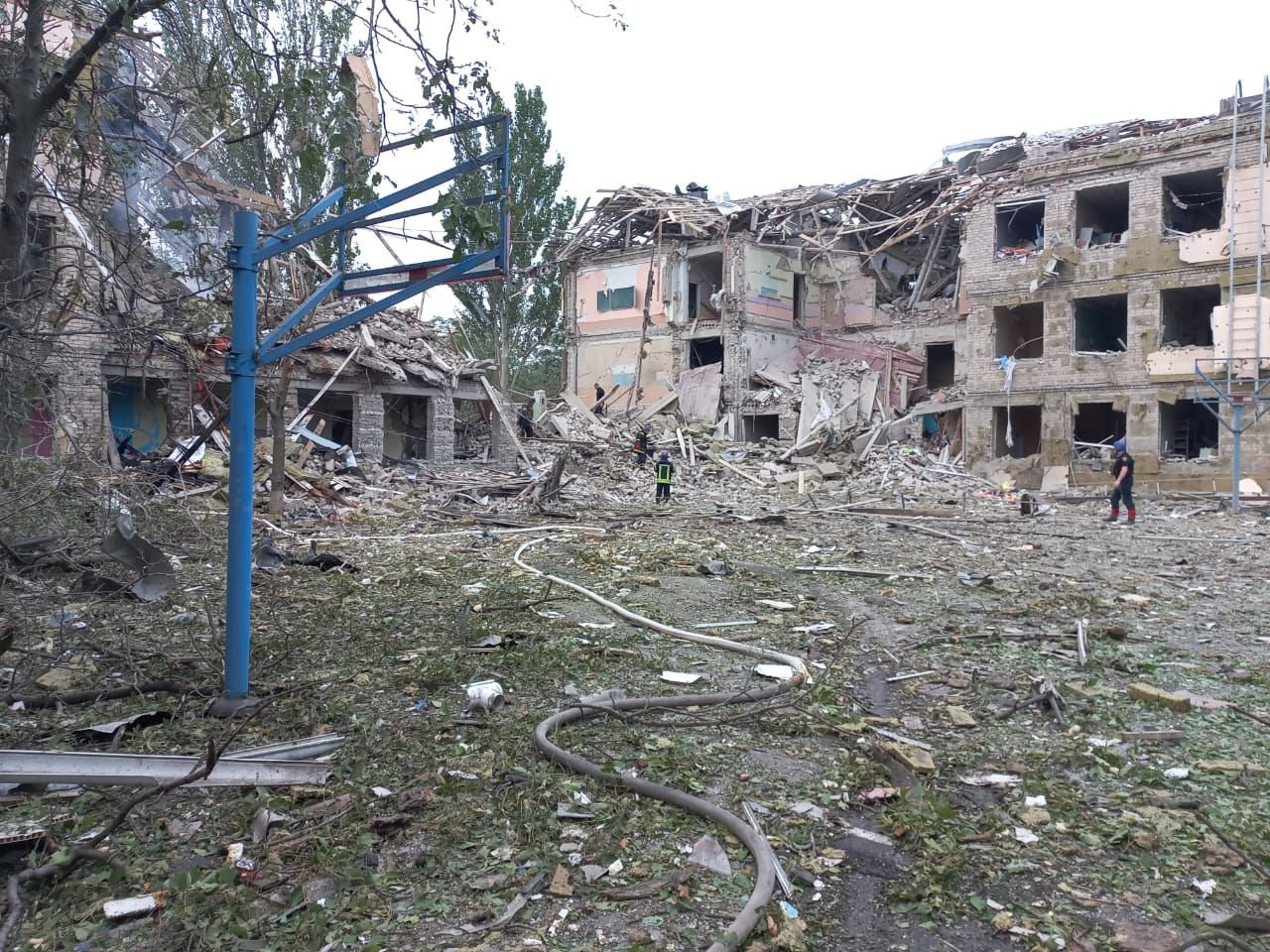
A school in Kramatorsk damaged by Russian shelling, 21 July 2022

UK Secretary of Defence, Ben Wallace, pledged 50,000 artillery shells, counter-battery radar systems, hundreds of drones" and "scores" of artillery guns over the coming weeks. MI6 chief, Richard Moore said that Russia's ability to spy had been reduced by "half".

Ukraine claimed to have done enough damage to stop Russia from using the Antonivka Road Bridge to transport ammunition.

The CEO of Metinvest, which owns the Azovstal Iron and Steel Works, accused Russia of taking £500 million worth of steel from Ukraine, which was then exported to a number of countries in Africa and Asia. Some of the steel had already been paid for by European countries, including the UK.

=== 22 July ===
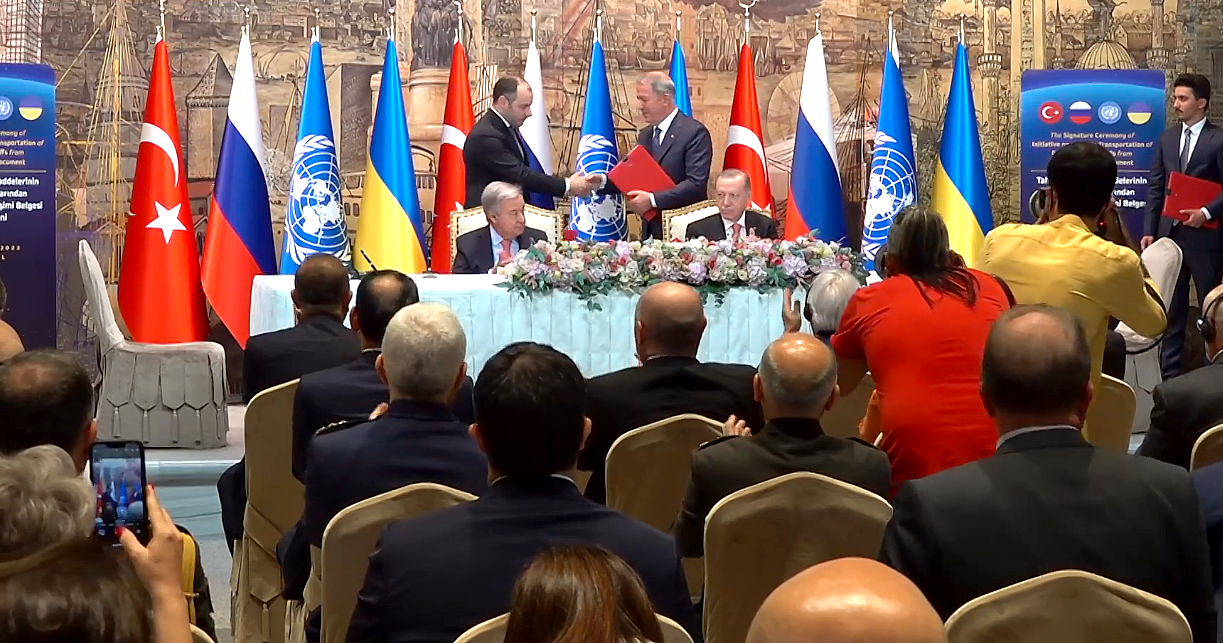
Signing ceremony of the Black Sea Grain Initiative in Istanbul

Russia and Ukraine signed a U.N.- and Turkey-brokered deal to free grain exports blockaded by Russia in Ukraine's Black Sea ports.

The US announced a new aid package, which includes 580 Phoenix Ghost drones.

Lithuania lifted the ban on the transportation of sanctioned goods to Kaliningrad from the Russian mainland by rail over Lithuanian soil.

Ukrainian sources reported that Ukrainian forces surrounded about 1,000 to 2,000 Russian soldiers near Vysokopillia in the Kherson Oblast. Russia announced the creation of a pro-Russian Ukrainian volunteer unit called the Odesa Brigade.

=== 23 July ===
Less than a day after signing a grain export deal with Ukraine, Russia launched Kalibr missiles at the port of Odesa. Ukraine claimed to have intercepted two of four missiles. Russian officials told Turkey that Russia had "nothing to do" with the missile strike. The next day, Igor Konashenkov, a spokesman of the Russian Ministry of Defence, confirmed the strike, claiming that it destroyed a warship and a warehouse of Harpoon anti-ship missiles.

=== 24 July ===
Russian's Defence Ministry claimed to have destroyed 100 HIMARS missiles in a strike on Dnipropetrovsk. The claim could not be independently verified.

=== 25 July ===
Alexander Bastrykin, head of the Russian Investigative Committee, ordered the judiciary to open over 1,300 charges against 92 members of the Armed Forces of Ukraine involved in "crimes against the peace and security of humanity". "Mercenaries" from NATO countries were also suspected.

Slovakia was considering transferring its 11 MiG-29s to Ukraine when they are grounded in August, if it can get replacement aircraft from NATO.

=== 26 July ===
Russian forces reportedly captured the Vuhlehirska Power Station, the second biggest power plant in Ukraine, on the approach to Bakhmut. Ukraine confirmed its fall the next day.

A fire at an oil depot in Donetsk was blamed on Ukrainian artillery, according to its DPR-appointed mayor, Alexey Kulemzin.

Ukraine received six British Stormer HVM anti-aircraft missile launchers.

Ukraine claimed to have struck the Antonivka Road Bridge again with HIMARS rockets.

The US said it was prepared to treat wounded Ukrainian soldiers at their Landstuhl Regional Medical Center in Germany. This was the first time such treatment was approved for Ukrainian soldiers at military instead of civilian hospitals.

=== 27 July ===
The Antonivka bridge was closed to civilians. A spokesman for the Ukrainian military said that they were not aiming to destroy the bridge. According to the BBC, Western officials described the bridge as "completely unusable" and UK officials said that Kherson city was now "virtually cut off from other occupied territories". Russian forces were compensating by the use of pontoon bridges and ferries. A railway bridge nearby was also damaged.

Ukrainian advisor Oleksiy Arestovych said that there was a "massive redeployment" of Russian forces to Kherson Oblast.

US congresswoman Elissa Slotkin, member of the United States House Committee on Armed Services, said there was bipartisan support towards sending Ukraine long-range ATACMS missiles.

=== 28 July ===
Ukrainian soldiers and officers fighting in Donetsk offered anecdotal evidence of a significant reduction in Russian artillery fire. Several groups of former Western soldiers were providing informal basic training to Ukrainian recruits.

=== 29 July ===
An explosion occurred at Olenivka prison, killing, between 40-50 Ukrainian POWs, including captured members of the Azov Regiment at Mariupol, and wounding 75. Ukraine's General Staff stated that the strike was committed by Russia to hide the torture and executions of Ukrainian prisoners of war. Russia claimed the prison was hit with HIMARS missiles and offered fragments of the rocket as proof. Ukraine asked the UN and Red Cross to investigate. The Red Cross asked Russian officials for access to the Olenivka prison camp, but received no response.

Germany pledged 16 bridge-laying Biber tanks: six in 2022, starting in the autumn, and ten in 2023.

US Department of Defense officials were reconsidering giving Ukraine US-made fighter jets and training pilots, citing how HIMARS rockets were reducing the number of Russian SAMs systems. The department would consider training Ukrainian pilots until a "platform" can be agreed upon and was also still wary of Russian air defences. The department disclosed that it had started the formal process of acquiring the NASAMS for Ukraine, consisting of two systems composed of 12 mobile batteries with 6 missiles each.

Russian forces built a pontoon bridge underneath the superstructure of the Antonivka bridge to help shield it from attack and carry traffic.

=== 30 July ===
According to the head spokesman for the Odesa Regional State Administration, a Ukrainian HIMARS rocket destroyed a Russian train which had arrived at the station in Brylivka, Kherson Oblast from Crimea. The rocket destroyed 40 cars, killed 80, including the drivers and engineers, and wounded 200 Russian soldiers.

=== 31 July ===
Russia accused Ukraine of a drone strike on the headquarters of the Black Sea Fleet in Sevastopol, injuring five and cancelling Navy Day celebrations. The drone was described as "homemade" and carried a "low-power" explosive device.

Separatist DNR officials claimed Ukrainian troops shelled the city center of Donetsk with PFM-1 anti-personnel land mines, with one person being wounded.

== August 2022 ==
=== 1 August ===
The first vessel with grain left Odesa under the U.N.- and Turkey-brokered deal between Ukraine and Russia for the export of food from Ukraine. According to Turkey, the ship was headed for Lebanon.

The US announced the 17th aid package for Ukraine, valued at $550 million, including 75,000 rounds of 155 mm and more HIMARS ammunition.

=== 2 August ===
The first ship with Ukrainian grain arrived in Turkey, with more to follow according to the Ukrainian government. Later that week, three ships loaded with Ukrainian corn, some 58,000 tonnes, arrived from Chornomorsk and Odesa, and four more grain ships left Ukrainian ports bound for Turkey.

The Azov Regiment was declared a terrorist group by the Russian Supreme Court, allowing for harsher penalties to be imposed on members of the group. Members were to face up to 10 years imprisonment, leaders up to 20 years.

=== 3 August ===
Rafael Grossi, the head of the IAEA, said that the Zaporizhzhia Nuclear Power Plant was "completely out of control" under Russian occupation. A mission to inspect the plant was being planned by IAEA, and waiting on approval by Ukrainian and Russian sides. Ukraine's state nuclear company opposed under reasoning that "any visit would legitimise Russia's presence there".

=== 4 August ===
North Macedonia said it would donate back to Ukraine four Su-25s sold to the country by the latter in 2001.

=== 5 August ===
The US government was preparing a new military aid package for Ukraine, at a value of approximately $1 billion.

The UK MoD said that the war was going to enter a "new phase", with Russian forces moving from Crimea and other parts of Ukraine to a front line extending from Zaporizhzhia to Kherson, along the Dnieper River. This was in response to a possible Ukrainian counteroffensive in the area.

Ukraine and Russia accused each other of shelling the Zaporizhzhia Nuclear Power Plant, with shells hitting the power lines forcing the operators to disconnect a reactor.

Russian media reported that North Korea offered to provide Russia with 100,000 volunteer soldiers for the war. Russian officials had not yet decided if they would accept the offer.

=== 6 August ===
Vitaly Gura, a Russian-backed deputy chief of Kakhovka Raion, was shot and later died.

=== 8 August ===
The Pentagon confirmed that Ukraine had been supplied with AGM-88 HARMs at an unknown date after wreckage was found near a Russian position.

The United States Department of Defense announced the 18th military aid package for Ukraine, which included additional HIMARS rockets, 75,000 155 mm artillery shells, 20 120 mm mortars, 20,000 120 mm mortar rounds, NASAMS munitions, 1,000 Javelins and "hundreds" of AT4 anti-armor weapons, Claymore mines, C-4 explosives, demolitions munitions and demolition equipment, 50 armored medical vehicles, and other medical supplies.

Ukraine claimed more HIMARS strikes on the Antonivskiy Road Bridge and the equipment used to repair it.

=== 9 August ===
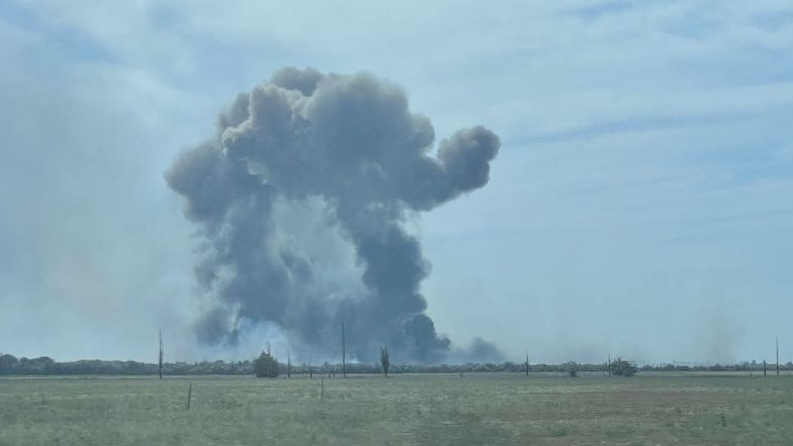
Explosions in Novofedorivka

Some 12 explosions were heard at the Russian Saky military airbase in Novofedorivka, Crimea, Ukraine claimed at least 9 aircraft were destroyed, without confirming the source of the explosions.

=== 10 August ===
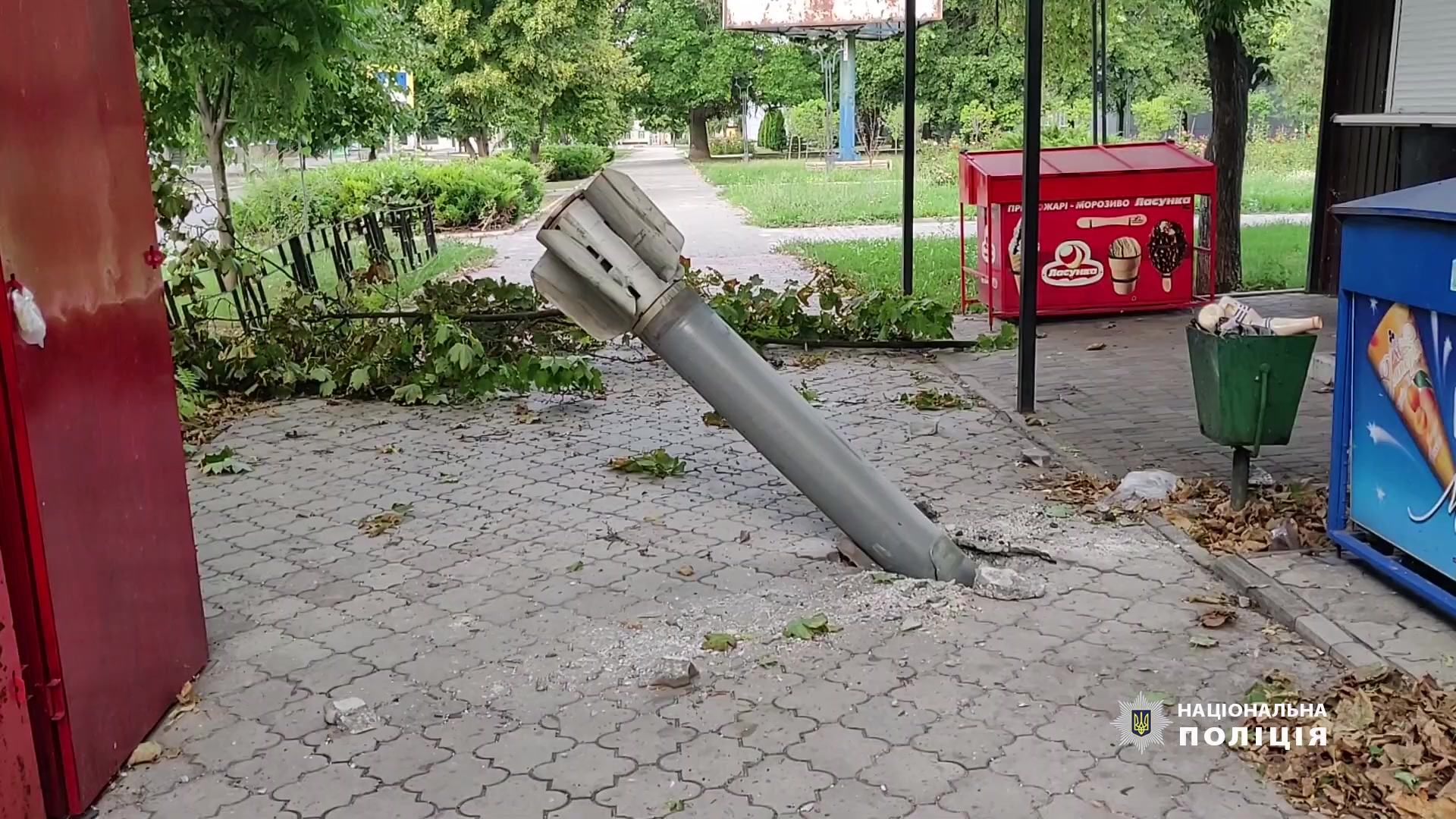
Bakhmut after shelling

President Zelenskyy said that "this Russian war...began with Crimea and must end with Crimea - with its liberation". Previously he had said that he would accept peace with Russia if they fell back to their 24 February positions.

Russian troops captured the Knauf plant near Soledar.

UK Defence Secretary Ben Wallace announced 3 more M270 MLRS would be sent to Ukraine.

=== 11 August ===
The Russian-installed occupation government of Zaporizhzhia set a 30 days motion to hold a referendum on its annexation to Russia, which would be conducted on 11 September unless the motion is withdrawn.

Poland, Slovakia, and the Czech Republic agreed to expand production of "artillery systems, munitions, and other military equipments" for use in Ukraine.

Eight explosions were reported at a Belarusian airbase 30 kilometres (19 mi) from the Ukrainian border. Belarus claimed that the explosions were due to a "technical incident" involving a vehicle engine. A Ukrainian official claimed Russia was suffering an "epidemic of technical accidents".

=== 12 August ===
UN Secretary-General António Guterres asked for a demilitarized zone to be created around the Zaporizhzhia Nuclear Power Plant after recent shelling struck an area used to store radioactive material. This echoes earlier calls by Ukraine and supported by the United States. Russia refused such calls saying that it was protecting the plant from "terrorist attacks"; however, it invited officials from the IAEA to visit. Two of the workers at the plant told the BBC, via text message, that the staff were hostages and that shelling had prevented them from doing their normal work.

An article published by the Kyiv Independent identified several deficiencies in Ukrainian artillery, including a "lack of effective top-level organization" and skills in counter-battery fire, as well as the near depletion of the former Soviet 152 mm ammunition during the late spring and the requisite switchover of Ukrainian artillery to the NATO-standard 155 mm ammunition in June. The reporting also described the benefits of using newer Western-supplied systems, including longer range and higher accuracy artillery systems that, over a period of weeks, resulted in the destruction of Russian command and control centers as well as "more than 50 fuel and munition dumps", which complicated artillery logistics and reduced Russian artillery fire rates in the Donbas by one-half to two-thirds.

=== 13 August ===
Swedish Defence Minister Peter Hultqvist said that his country was ready to directly produce weapons for use in Ukraine.

Ukraine claimed to have destroyed the last bridge to the Kakhovka Hydroelectric Power Plant, the last bridge for Russian forces to transit in or out of Kherson. Russian forces could only resupply soldiers on the west bank of the Dnipro by its two pontoon bridges, according to the UK MoD.

Lt Gen Sir James Hockenhull, the departing head of UK Military Intelligence said that neither Russia nor Ukraine were "likely to achieve any decisive military action" in the war for 2022.

=== 14 August ===
Ukraine claimed that Russian commanders in Kherson had withdrawn from the west to the east bank of the Dnieper River, leaving Russian forces in the city isolated.

=== 15 August ===
Ukraine claimed to have struck a base being used as headquarters for the Wagner Group with a HIMARS rocket. Serhiy Haydai, the governor of Luhansk Oblast, said that the location was revealed by Russian journalist Sergei Sreda. The image posted online showed a sign giving a street in Popasna. According to a pro-Moscow blogger, a probable HIMARS strike on a Wagner location in Popasna was confirmed by sources in the Donbas.

=== 16 August ===
Explosions were reported at an arms depot at Maiske, in Dzhankoi Raion, northern Crimea. Two people were hurt. Russian officials claimed it was due to a fire. A Ukrainian official said the explosions were "demilitarisation in action". Rail service was halted and 2,000 people were evacuated. The Russian Defence Ministry blamed the blast on "sabotage". According to a Ukrainian official, the explosions were carried out by an elite Ukrainian military unit.

CNN, citing Western and Ukrainian officials, claimed that Russian forces could not resupply their position near Kherson due to prior damage to bridges in Kherson Oblast and alleged Ukrainian attacks in Crimea.

The commander of the Ukrainian army, Valerii Zaluzhnyi, said Russia was shelling Ukrainian positions 700-800 times a day, using 40,000-60,000 pieces of ammunition, after a lull in early July.

=== 17 August ===
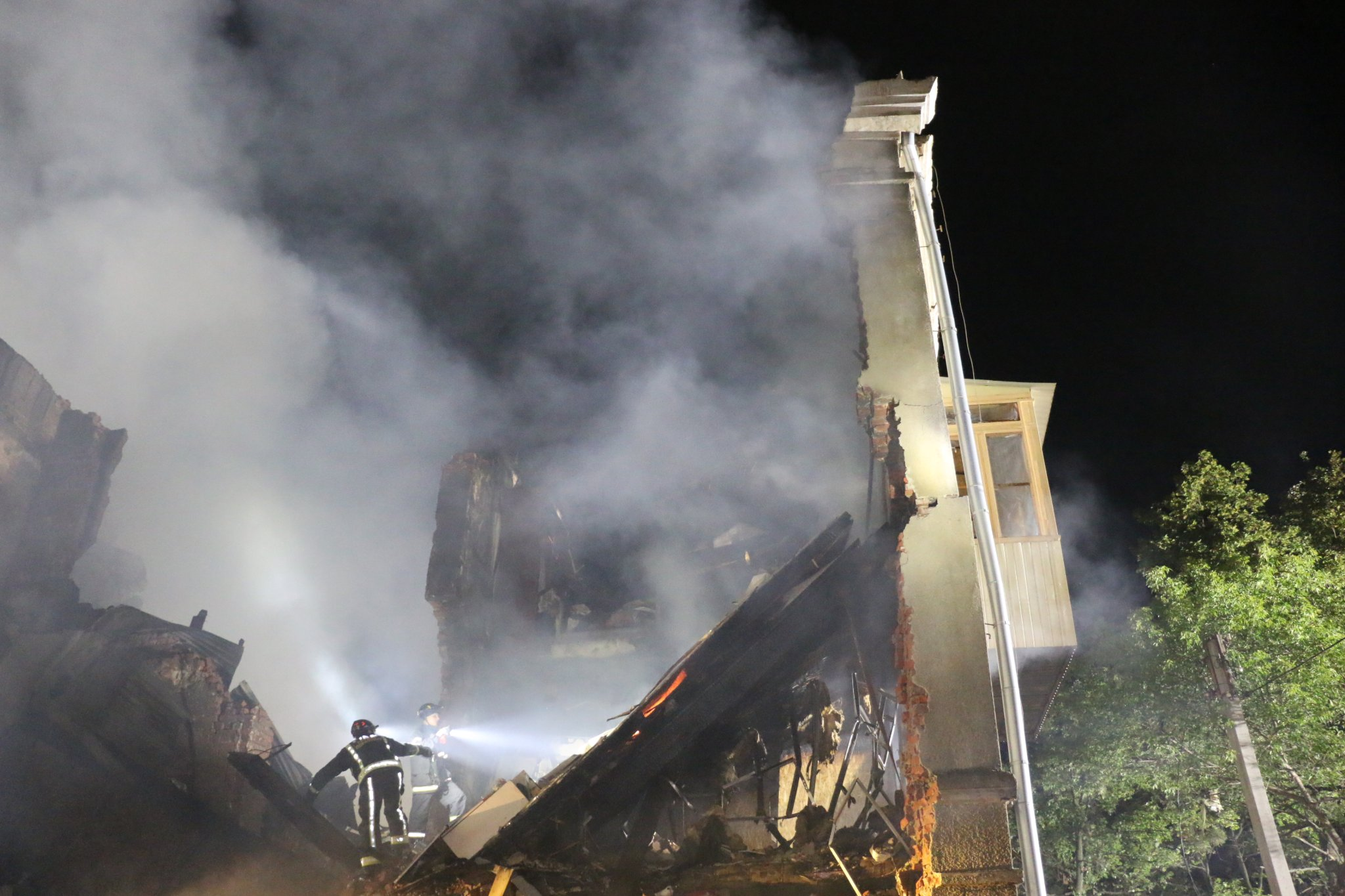
Remains of the residential building in Kharkiv after the missile strike

A Russian missile hit a three-story residential building in Kharkiv, killing 12 and injuring 20 people, including at least one child. The building was completely destroyed.

The head of the Russian Black Sea Fleet, Igor Osipov, was replaced by Viktor Sokolov following heavy losses in personnel and shipping under his command over the last six months.

The Jewish Agency for Israel said that some 20,500 Jews had left Russia since the war began, out of an estimated population of 165,000.

=== 18 August ===
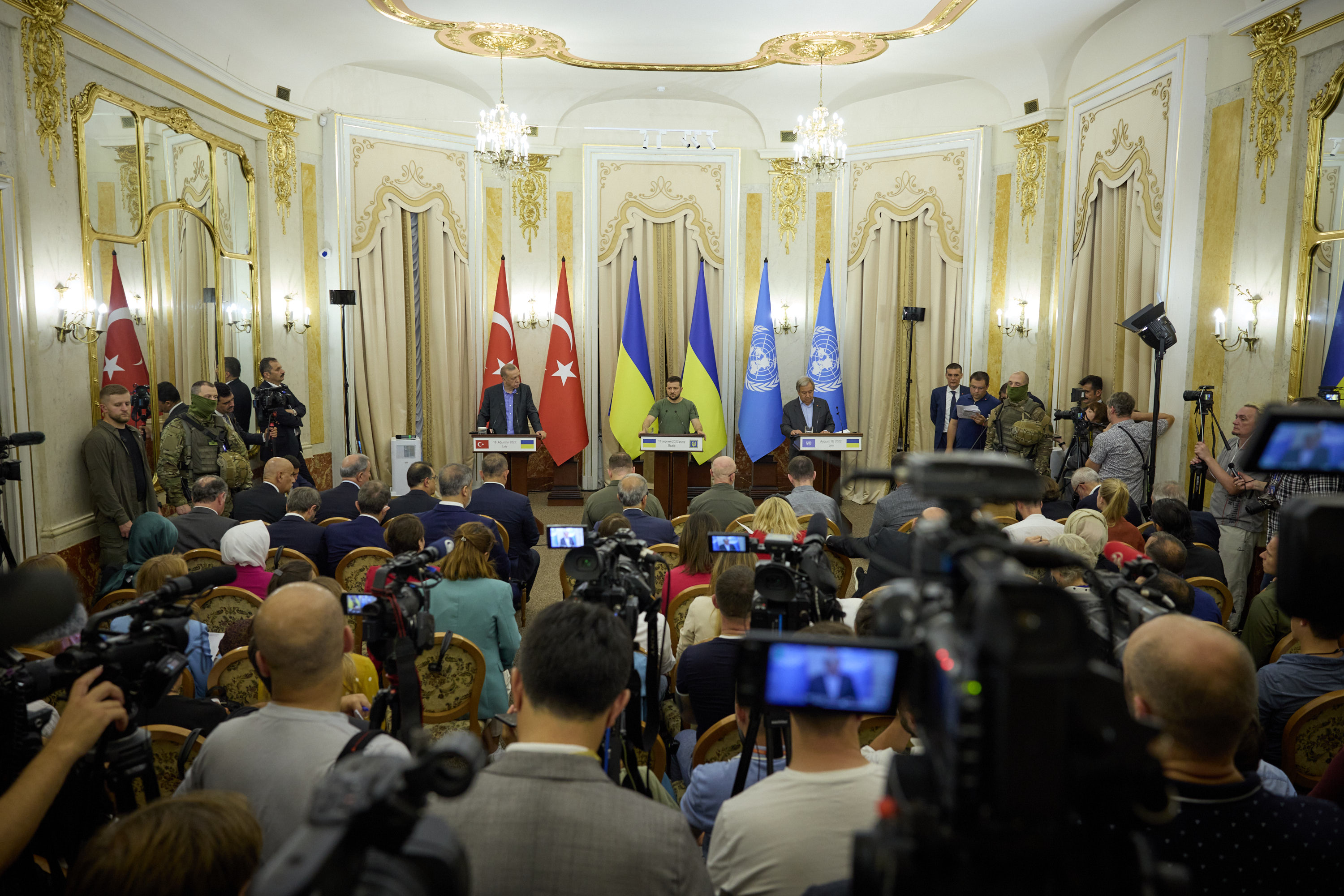
Joint press conference with Ukrainian President Zelenskyy, Turkish President Erdoğan and UN Secretary-General Guterres

A trilateral meeting in Lviv was held between UN Secretary-General António Guterres, Turkish President Recep Tayyip Erdoğan, and President Zelenskyy. Topics discussed in the meeting included the security of the Zaporizhzhia Nuclear Power Plant, the grain export deal and the exchange of prisoners of war.

Ukraine claimed a strike on Nova Kakhovka, using a HIMARS rocket, killed 12 and injured 10 Russians.

In response to the Russian invasion of Ukraine, Estonia removed a Soviet-era tank monument near Narva. After its removal, Estonia was subject to "the most extensive cyberattack" since the 2007.

In Russia, the villages of Timonovo and Soloti in Belgorod Oblast, some 30 kilometres (19 mi) from the Ukrainian border, were evacuated due to a fire at an ammunition store. Video showed thick smoke, fire and several fire engines responding.

=== 19 August ===
The US government announced its 19th military aid package to Ukraine, valued at some US$775 million. It included 15 ScanEagle surveillance drones, HIMARS rockets, 1,000 Javelin anti-tank missiles, some 40 MaxxPro M1224 MRAP vehicles, sixteen 105 mm guns, and more HARM missiles. Russian troops captured the towns of Zaitseve and Dacha in Donetsk Oblast.

=== 20 August ===
Russia claimed Ukraine carried out a drone attack on the headquarters of the Black Sea Fleet in occupied Crimea.

Near Bolshiye Vyazyomy in Russia, a suspected car IED killed Darya Dugina, a Russian propagandist and daughter of Alexander Dugin. Ukraine was accused by Russian officials for the attack but denied involvement.

=== 23 August ===
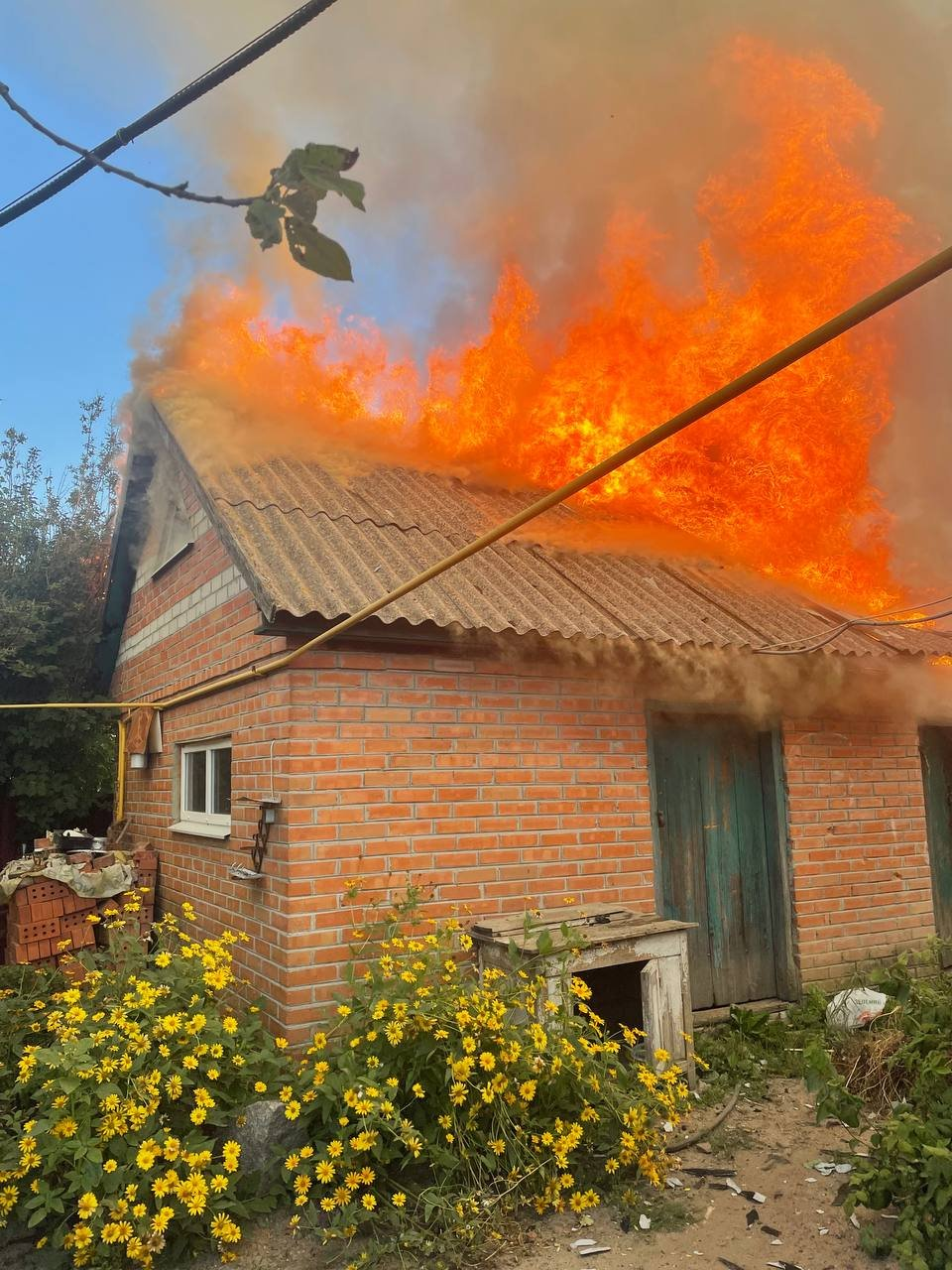
Village house in Kharkiv Oblast after Russian shelling on 23 August

Canada's prime minister, Justin Trudeau, announced $3.85 million for various training programs including for Ukrainian Police and emergency services.

=== 24 August ===
The New Zealand Army confirmed that Dominic Aleben, a soldier with the NZDF who went on leave without pay in Ukraine, was killed in action along with an American national while fighting with the Ukrainian Foreign Legion in eastern Ukraine.

UK Prime Minister Boris Johnson visited Ukraine for the third time since the Russian invasion began. Johnson announced a £54 million military aid package for Ukraine including unmanned air systems and anti-tank loitering munitions.

The United States Department of Defense announced its 20th military aid package for Ukraine, valued at $3 billion. The package included six NASAMS air defense systems, 245,000 rounds of 155 mm artillery ammunition, 65,000 rounds of 120 mm mortar ammunition, 24 counter-artillery radars, Puma unmanned aerial systems (UAS) and support equipment for ScanEagle UAS, VAMPIRE counter-unmanned aerial systems, and Laser-guided rocket systems

A Russian missile attack on a railway station in Chaplyne, Dnipropetrovsk Oblast killed 25 civilians and injured more than 80.

=== 25 August ===
Putin ordered the call-up of 137,000 soldiers for use in Ukraine by the end of the year, though it was unclear if these soldiers would be drafted or were volunteers.

Research conducted by the Yale University's School of Public Health's Humanitarian Research Lab and the Conflict Observatory located some 21 filtration camps in Russian-occupied Donetsk Oblast run by Russian and Russian-allied forces and housing Ukrainian "civilians, POWs, and other personnel" for four main purposes: "1) registration points, 2) camps and other holding facilities for those awaiting registration, 3) interrogation centers, and 4) correctional colonies". Satellite pictures of the camps also indicated disturbed earth, which researchers said was consistent with mass graves. Kaveh Khoshnood, a professor at the Yale's School of Public Health's, said: "Incommunicado detention of civilians is more than a violation of international humanitarian law — it represents a threat to the public health of those currently in the custody of Russia and its proxies. The conditions of confinement documented in this report allegedly include insufficient sanitation, shortages of food and water, cramped conditions, and reported acts consistent with torture."

=== 26 August ===
At 3:30 am, local time, Ukrainian forces struck the Hotel Donbas, in the town of Kadiivka, Luhansk Oblast, with "10 HIMARS missiles" according to Russian media. Ukraine claimed the hotel was being used as a barracks and it had killed 200 paratroopers. There was no independent confirmation of Ukrainian claims. Pro-Russian Telegram channels said the hotel was "choke-full".

Latvia, in response to the invasion of Ukraine, destroyed the controversial 80-meter high Soviet-era Monument to the Liberators of Soviet Latvia and Riga from the German Fascist Invaders in Victory Park. The Polish government claimed that Belarus destroyed a monument to the Polish Home Army that were killed during World War 2, which also included a graveyard. Poland also announced that it was going to demolish a monument to Soviet soldiers in the southwest of the country.

Germany's counterintelligence service believed that there were active Russian spies in the country monitoring the training of Ukrainian soldiers on Western artillery systems by US and German trainers. The spies were believed to be using both vehicles and drones.

The Ukrainian government distributed iodine tablets to residents living near the Zaporizhzhia Nuclear Power Plant. Two of the six reactors were reconnected to the grid after being disconnected earlier following "fire damage to a transmission line" on 25 August. Satellite photos indicated smoke rising from the plant over the last several days.

=== 27 August ===
Russia blocked a draft of the Nuclear Non-Proliferation Treaty, which is subject to a five yearly review, over a section referring to Ukraine, specifically saying: "the loss of control by the competent Ukrainian authorities over such locations as a result of those military activities, and their profound negative impact on safety". Russia claimed that the section lacked "balance", and that some paragraphs on the treaty were "blatantly political in nature".

=== 28 August ===
The US announced increasing production of HIMARS units and GMLRS rockets to assist Ukraine. Western sources reported that Russia moved its newly formed Third Army Corps to its border.

== See also ==
- Outline of the Russo-Ukrainian War
- Bibliography of Ukrainian history
