= Timeline of the Russo-Ukrainian war (1 September 2026 – present) =

Timeline of the Russo-Ukrainian war (2022–present)
- Prelude; (up to 23 February 2022); Initial invasion; (24 February – 7 April 2022); Southeastern front; (8 April – 28 August 2022); 2022 Ukrainian counteroffensives; (29 August – 11 November 2022); Second stalemate; (12 November 2022 – 7 June 2023); 2023 Ukrainian counteroffensive; (8 June 2023 – 31 August 2023); 2023 Ukrainian counteroffensive, cont.; (1 September – 30 November 2023); 2023–2024 winter campaigns; (1 December 2023 – 31 March 2024); 2024 spring and summer campaigns; (1 April – 31 July 2024); 2024 summer–autumn offensives; (1 August – 31 December 2024); 2025 winter–spring offensives; (1 January 2025 – 31 May 2025); 2025 summer offensives; (1 June 2025 – 31 August 2025); 2025 autumn–winter offensives; (1 September 2025 – 31 December 2025); 2026 winter–spring offensives; (1 January 2026 – 31 May 2026); 2026 summer offensives; (1 June 2026 – 31 August 2026); 2026 autumn–winter offensives; (1 September 2026 – present)

This timeline of the Russo-Ukrainian war covers the period from 1 September 2026 to the present day.

== September 2026 ==
=== 1 September ===
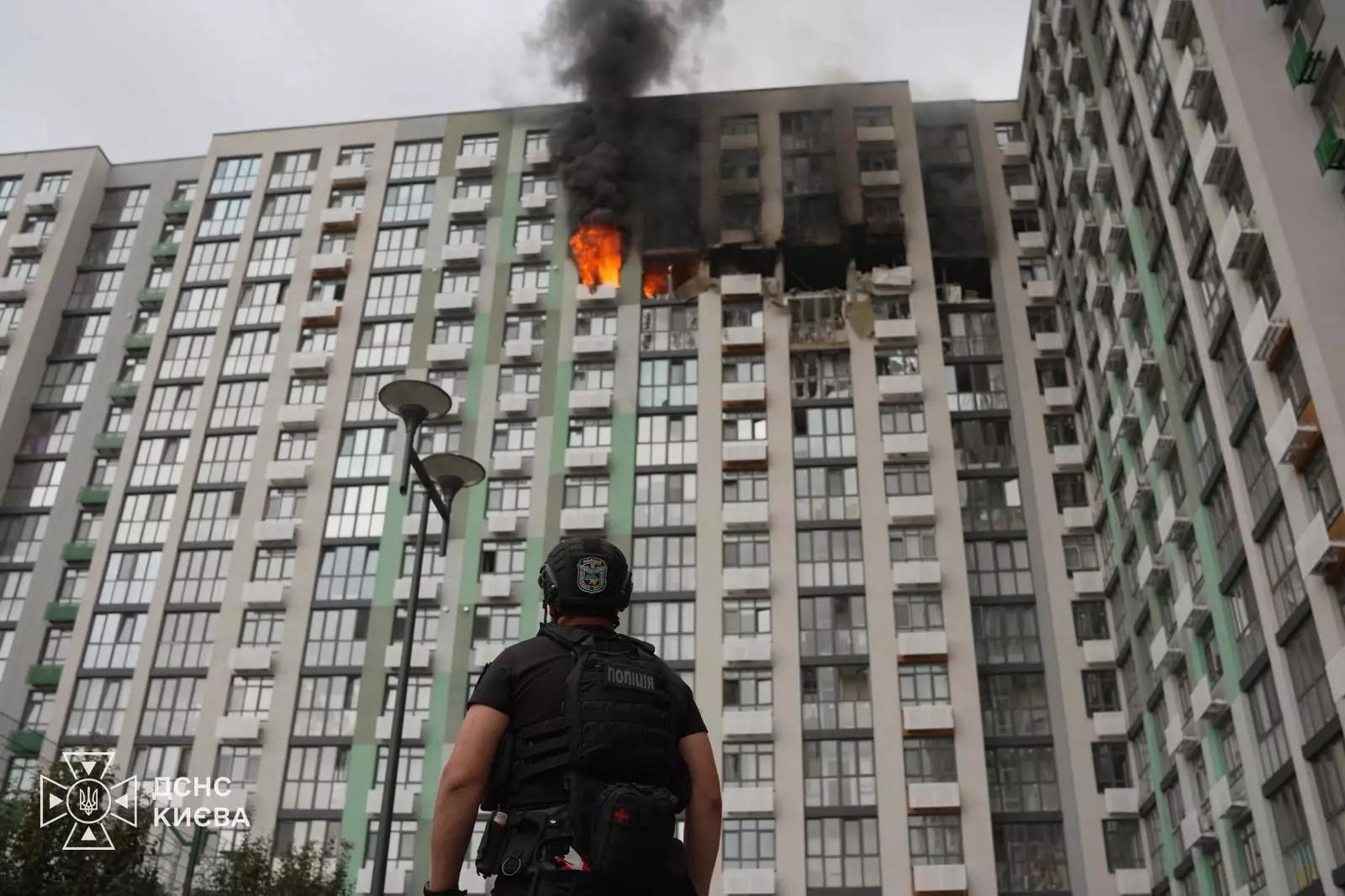
Apartment building in Kyiv after the attack

Ukrainian drones attacked and damaged port infrastructure at Ust-Luga. The regional governor confirmed a fire at the port while claiming 38 drones had been shot down.

Overnight Russian strikes killed 12 people, including six Ukrainian Railways employees, and injured 21 others in Kyiv and the surrounding area.

President Zelenskyy warned "airlines, insurers, and foreign governments" to avoid Russian airspace as it "will be de facto closed" by Ukrainian drones. President Putin called such actions "state terrorism".

=== 2 September ===
The Proton-PM facility near Perm caught fire.

A shootout broke out between units of the SBU and HUR in Kyiv. Three HUR officers were wounded during the firefight, two seriously, between both services involving the deputy head of the Russian Volunteer Corps, Stepan Kaplunov. The HUR accused the SBU of kidnapping Kaplunov, while the SBU accused Kaplunov of working with the FSB. President Zelenskyy subsequently fired SBU official Oleh Khramov, head of the SBU's department for the protection of state secrets.

Some 27 flights to and from Moscow were cancelled by various international airlines due to Ukrainian threats to Russian airspace over the capital.

=== 3 September ===
The commander of the 22nd Guards Heavy Bomber Aviation Division, Major General Nikolai Varpakhovich, was shot near the village of Probuzhdenie, near Engels-2 air base. Varpakhovich was shot twice, once in the face and once in the torso. A Moldovan national accused of carrying out the attack was subsequently arrested by the FSB in Astrakhan Oblast.

Ukrainian naval drones attacked Sochi, with explosions and smoke being reported over the port. Nine oil depots were destroyed, while the Russian vessel Nefrit was struck. A Ka-52 and an Mi-28 were destroyed while an Mi-8 was damaged at Sochi International Airport, also damaged were two radars and an S-300 missile system. The PETRUS plant in Noginsk was set on fire by Ukrainian drones.

=== 4 September ===
Headquarters of Security Service of Ukraine after the attack

A Russian drone hit the headquarters of the SBU in Kyiv, injuring 12 people. Zelenskyy said that the attack was aimed at assassinating SBU chief Oleksandr Poklad. Attacks were also carried out on two vessels in Odesa Oblast.

In Sterlitamak, the Sterlitamak Petrochemical Plant and the Avangard Federal State Enterprise were struck by Ukrainian drones. At least 12 FP-1 drones were used in the attack. Both facilities produce explosives, synthetic rubber and aviation fuel, among other military products.

The HUR struck a K-300P Bastion-P missile system in Crimea that was capable of firing Zircon and Onyx missiles.

=== 5 September ===
President Zelenskyy ordered a halt to attacks on Moscow from 5 to 8 September to allow U.S. envoys Steve Witkoff and Jared Kushner to visit Kyiv and then Moscow for peace talks. Russian attacks killed four people and injured five others in Dnipropetrovsk Oblast.

President Putin ordered a halt to attacks on Kyiv, for three days starting from midnight on 6 September to allow US peace envoys to visit Kyiv and Moscow for talks.

An explosion in Simferopol killed Anatoly Chernyshov, a pro-Russian fundraiser. He was posthumously awarded the Order of Courage by President Putin.

=== 6 September ===
The Lady Maria, a Russian-flagged sanctioned tanker, was struck 12 times near Sicily by Ukrainian drones launched from Libya. The vessel was travelling from Oran to Syria with suspected Iranian weapons on board.

The Ryazan oil refinery was set ablaze by Ukrainian drones, while explosions and firing from air defences were reported in Bataysk.

=== 7 September ===
Ukrainian drones struck oil refineries in Ryazan and Perm Oblasts and Tatarstan, with smoke and/or fires being at all three locations. Ukrainian drones struck the Taganrog-Central air base, striking an Mi-35 and an Mi-8.

Two Russian Su-35Ss collided over Kursk Oblast. One pilot was killed, the second survived.

=== 8 September ===
Train in Sumy Oblast after drone strike on 8 September

Two people were killed in Russian airstrikes on Kyiv.

Ukrainian drones attacked Saratov Oil Refinery, residents reported explosions and a fire.

The EU approved the use of a loan for Ukraine to purchase 1,000 Patriot missiles.

The ISW reported that a Ukrainian brigade commander operating in the Orikhiv direction claimed that the Russians had formed 120 assault groups, totaling "roughly" 150,000 personnel, to support offensive operations against the city.

=== 9 September ===
Checkpoint on the Ukrainian-Moldovan border in Odesa Oblast after drone strike on 9 September

The Romanian Intelligence Service detained a Russian national suspected of trying to sabotage a Ukrainian aircraft in Romania.

Ukrainian drones struck the naval base at Novorossiysk, with fires being reported at the seaport's fuel oil terminal and naval base. Four people were killed in the attack. The Russian frigate Admiral Essen was struck by a Neptune missile, starting a fire on the ship’s superstructure. An Su-33 and an Mi-8 were also destroyed by Ukrainian drones. Drones also attacked the Purovsky Gas Condensate Processing Plant, 3,200 km (2,000 mi) from the Ukrainian border, a record for FP-1 drones. Fires were reported at facility along with smoke, to avoid an explosion the plant released excess gas through the flare stacks.

A Ukrainian naval drone struck Sochi, setting fire to the port embankment and injuring eight people. A concert by Tatiana Bulanova was evacuated.

German defence minister Boris Pistorius said that Germany would transfer PAC2 missiles from Bundeswehr stocks to Ukraine.

Norwegian prime minister Jonas Gahr Støre announced that President Zelenskyy’s aircraft was nearly struck by an UAV while taking off from Moldova the day before.

=== 10 September ===
Aftermath of the attack on Dnipro

Five people were killed in a Russian airstrike on a mall in Pavlohrad. Two people were killed in an attack on an American oil extraction plant in Dnipro.

Ukrainian drones struck Makhachkala, with reports of fires raging near the city’s port with the Caspian Sea. One person was killed in a separate attack on Borisoglebsk, Voronezh Oblast.

Canadian Prime Minister Mark Carney stated that Canada was supplying a CA$350 million aid package to Ukraine in order to bolster Ukrainian air defenses.

=== 11 September ===
Ambulance in Yasnohirka, Donetsk Oblast after Russian drone strike on 11 September

A Russian airstrike on Odesa Oblast destroyed the family apartment of tennis player Dayana Yastremska and left 37 injured and 2 missing across the region.

Ukrainian drones struck an Ozon warehouse and an oil refinery, both in Saratov. The Ozon facility ceased operations due to the resulting fire. Ukrainian FP-5 Flamingo missiles struck the Volgogradpromproekt in Volgograd. The company has been sanctioned by the US since 2023, and manufactures ferrocene which is "used as a catalyst and combustion-rate modifier for composite solid rocket propellants." The strike destroyed a 20 m × 15 m (66 ft × 49 ft) section of the plant’s main workshop.

=== 12 September ===
Apartment building in Odesa after attack on 12 September

Ukrainian drones attacked a strategic chemical plant in Tolyatti and an airfield and automobile plant in Taganrog. A tank at the automobile plant in Taganrog caught fire and fires were reported at the airfield.

A Ukrainian naval drone destroyed a Russian naval drone in the Black Sea, which the Ukrainian Navy described as the "This is the first-ever battle between unmanned naval boats".

A Ukrainian aerial drone struck the Russian tanker Armada Leader near Sochi. The vessel was escorted by a helicopter that engaged the drone with gunfire.

According to the ISW, HUR director Lieutenant General Oleh Ivashchenko claimed in an interview that Russian generals have asked President Putin to mobilize 800,000 additional troops after the 2026 Russian legislative election, "likely to sustain and enable Russian offensive operations in the face of enormous Russian casualty rates". He claimed that Russia's daily casualty rate exceeded their recruitment rate, with "about" 60% of casualties being killed in action, an "extraordinarily high ratio of killed to wounded when the standard ratio in modern war is 1:3". The ISW assessed that Russia does not currently possess the training and administrative capabilities to fully mobilize 800,000 new recruits, especially if they did so during their semi-annual October conscription cycle.

The Ukrainian Unmanned Systems Force killed Russian Major General Anton Grunis during a raid in Horlivka.

=== 13 September ===
Ukrainian drones struck the TANECO refinery in Nizhnekamsk and the Slavyansky oil refinery in Slavyansk-on-Kuban.

An unknown object flew from Belarus through Lithuanian airspace before reaching Kaliningrad.

Russian drones attacked a fuel station in Yahodyn, Volyn Oblast, and a Warsaw-bound train at Yahodyn railway station.

=== 14 September ===
A German-Ukrainian woman identified as "Ilona W." was charged by German authorities with providing intelligence to the Russian Embassy in Berlin. According to the case's prosecutor, "Ilona W." had been in contact with the Russian embassy since October 2023 and tried to convince members of the German Ministry of Defense to defect to Russia.

HUR Chief, Lt. General Oleh Ivashchenko, claimed that Russia had recruited over 28,000 foreign mercenaries for the war in an attempt to "offset its battlefield losses". He also claimed that Russia could increase the number of North Korean troops in Kursk Oblast to 50,000, with 8,000 currently deployed there.

=== 15 September ===
House in Sumy after drone strike on 15 September

Russia struck port utilities in Odesa.

Ukrainian drones struck the Syzran Oil Refinery.

The Atlant Aero drone factory in Taganrog was struck by Neptune missiles, resulting in a roof collapse.

The 3rd Army Corps of Ukraine confirmed conducting counteroffensive operations called Operation Vivaldi to clear Russian forces from Dnipropetrovsk Oblast, which includes countering the Russian salient northwest of Lyman in Donetsk oblast.

Elena Astanina, a Ukrainian woman who was head of a section of the Russian election commission, was killed in a drone strike in Zhovtneve. She is accused of orchestrating “sham” Russian referendums in Donetsk, Luhansk, Zaporizhzhia and Kherson Oblasts.

=== 16 September ===
Poland closed two airports at Lublin and Rzeszow for 40 minutes and scrambled fighter jets due to a Russian drone attack on Ukraine.

Ukrainian forces retook Serednie, Donetsk Oblast.

=== 17 September ===
Poland said it would send up to €50 million euros worth of F-16 ammunition for Ukraine to shoot down Russian drones.

Ukrainian drones hit two S-400 launchers in Bryansk Oblast, an Su-24M at Saky airbase, the Yaroslavl oil refinery, and a military airfield in Rostov Oblast. Ukrainian drones attacked an airfield in Rostov, damaging a An-12, two An-26, and three more helicopters. Satellite imagery showed the “complete destruction” of two Mi-8 helicopters, another An-12 and a An-26.

Three medical workers and the head of the medical advisory commission for Ternopil Oblast were arrested on suspicion of accepting bribes, ranging from $6,000 to $12,000, to give some 1,000 Ukrainians medical deferment certificates for military services, between 2024 and 2026.

Ukraine repatriated the remains of some 252 deceased citizens from Russia.

=== 18 September ===
Administrative building in Odesa after a strike on 18 September

Two people were killed in a Russian attack on Zhytomyr Oblast.

Moscow Mayor Sergey Sobyanin claimed that 350 Ukrainian drones were shot down, including 64 on a “terminal approach” to Moscow, while the others were shot down over Moscow Oblast. Vnukovo and Domodedovo airports cancelled flights for several hours.

Two Ukrainian companies completed “combat tests” of drones capable of intercepting Russian jet-powered Shahed drones.

Estonia's intelligence chief, Col. Ants Kiviselg, claimed that Russian losses over the past week were 11,000, averaging 1,600 personnel killed and wounded per day. He also claimed that this was the third consecutive week that Russian troop losses exceeded 10,000.

=== 19 September ===
Shopping center in Dnipro after a strike on 19 September

Three people were killed in a Russian drone attack on Kyiv Oblast.

The Trump administration approved a potential $2.68 billion sale of air defense equipment to Ukraine, adding that the country would finance it using a combination of European contributions and US foreign military financing. The package includes S-300 Clone missiles, GAM-67 anti-aircraft missiles, plus counter drone weapons such as laser guided rockets, drone detection equipment, spare parts and software.

Russia claimed that it hit a Ukrainian cargo vessel and a tanker in the Black Sea region.

The Russian Defence Ministry claimed to have intercepted some 344 Ukrainian drones over 16 regions of Russia. In Sochi the beaches were closed due to the threat of sea drones, the local airport suspended operations while voting in the city for the 2026 Russian legislative election was suspended for the day.

President Trump signed into law the “Lindsey O Graham Sanctioning Russia and Iran Act of 2026”, which in part allows him to impose tariffs, of up to 100%, on buyers of Russian oil, including China and India.

The SBU released footage of a new drone interceptor, which its counterintelligence unit developed, downing a Geran-5.

Ukrainian drones struck targets near Kaspiysk, explosions were reported and helicopters were involved in intercepting drones. The Makhachkala Uytash Airport suspended flights.

Alexander Isaev, commander of the Russian Army’s 8th Artillery Regiment, was killed by a Ukrainian drone strike. He was accused of previous war crimes while serving in Ukraine.

=== 20 September ===
Ukraine launched at least 1,000 drones towards Russia. 249 drones were reported shot down over Moscow, with the Moscow Refinery being set ablaze. In total 288 drones were claimed shot down over 12 regions, drones or drone debris killed a woman in Sofyino and injured five others. A man was killed in an unspecified region in a private home. 400 people were evacuated due to a fire at an apartment building in Ramenskoye. President Zelenskyy said that FP-5 Flamingo and FP-7 Pelican missiles were used during the attack.

=== 21 September ===
Biological department of Zaporizhzhia National University after the attack

One person was killed in a Russian attack on Sumy and two in attacks on Kharkiv Oblast. One person was killed in Ukrainian attack on Bryansk Oblast. In the night Russian drones damaged the biological department of Zaporizhzhia National University, housed inside a building built in 1902, while a separate attack damaged the building of Sumy State University.

=== 22 September ===
Destructions in Kramatorsk after the bombing on 22 September

One person was killed in a Ukrainian drone attack on Samara Oblast.

Seven people were killed and seven injured by a Russian glide bomb attack in Izium, Kharkiv Oblast.

One person was killed and four injured after FPV drone attacks in Kyivskyi District, Kharkiv. A car dealership and a car were also damaged.

Ukrainian forces struck Russian drone command posts near Novoselivka Persha and Dachne, Pokrovsk Raion, both in occupied Donetsk Oblast. A drone storage depot in occupied Volnovakha was also hit.

A fuel depot was hit in Kalininskyi in occupied Luhansk Oblast. Two warehouses were also hit by Hirnyk, Donetsk Oblast and Velyka Shyshovka, both in occupied Donetsk Oblast.

=== 23 September ===
Russian forces took Markove, Donetsk Oblast.

Ukrainian forces retook Shandryholove, Derylove, and Seredne, all in Donetsk Oblast.

A state of emergency was declared in Krasnodar Krai due to Ukrainian drone attacks on transport and agricultural infrastructure.

President Zelenskyy said that Ukraine had transferred two North Korean prisoners to South Korean custody. They were captured by Ukrainian forces during the Kursk campaign on 11 January 2025.

Five people were killed and four injured in Russian attacks on Oleksandrivka, Donetsk Oblast. An apartment building was destroyed, with another 11 apartment buildings, 42 homes, and a shop being damaged.

One person was killed and another injured in a Russian FPV drone attack in Druzhkivka. One person was injured by shelling in Slatyne, while another was injured in Staryi Saltiv, Kharkiv Oblast.

Houses, cars and apartment buildings were damaged in Izium, Kharkiv Oblast after a russian artillery attack.

A civilian car was damaged in Derhachi. Private houses were also damaged in Bohodukhiv, as well as an apartment building in Lozova. A petrol station in Shevchenkove (rural settlement), Kharkiv Oblast caught fire due to a russian UAV attack. An administrative building in Velykyi Burluk was also damaged.

=== 24 September ===
Ukrainian air defence intercepted 60% of ballistic missiles fire at Kyiv, during three waves, according to President Zelenskyy. Four Zircon missiles and three Iskander missiles were intercepted. Two were killed and eight injured. The Maternity Hospital No. 2 was partially damaged. The Holy Intercession Church in Podil, which was built in 1906, was also damaged.

An apartment building in Khmelnytskyi was damaged from falling drone debris, displacing 35 people.

A driver was killed in Kramatorsk when a Russian FPV drone attacked his lorry.

A drone entered Romanian airspace, travelling for three to four minutes before crashing near Solca. Two Romanian F-16s and two Spanish F-18s were scrambled, school classes in the area were cancelled and air raid alerts activated. Police later found a “small UAV”.

Six people were killed and 14 injured in a Russian attack on a farm in Stara Hnylytsia in Chuhuiv Raion, Kharkiv Oblast.

=== 25 September ===
House in Lozova (Kharkiv Oblast) after the attack on 25 September

Ukrainian drones struck the Lukoil refinery in Perm. The Iskra electronics plant in Ulyanovsk and a synthetic rubber factory in Voronezh was damaged. The Novoshakhtinsk oil refinery was damaged by Ukrainian drones, with 50 drones being shot down.

Two people were injured and a hospital was damaged in strikes on Zaporizhzhia.

A vehicle operated by two foreign journalists was destroyed in Sloviansk.

A Russian Shahed drone attack hit an apartment building in a residential neighborhood of Kyiv, killing a child.

A hypermarket was attacked by drones in occupied Luhansk, causing a fire.

A Russian radar in occupied Semenivske, Donetsk Oblast was hit by Ukrainian strikes at night. An ammunition depot in Sievierodonetsk was also hit.

=== 26 September ===
Russian authorities claimed that a Ukrainian drone strike killed three people in Krasnodar. Ukraine said that it struck Ilsky Oil Refinery.

Three lorries were damaged and three people were injured in a Russian attack in Odesa.

Two people were killed and three injured in a Russian guided aerial bomb attack in Sumy.

Ukrainian Neptune missiles, plus Ruta, Palianytsia, and Bars missile drones, struck the Azov Optical-Mechanical Plant in the Rostov region. Strikes on railway cars, carrying fuel and lubricants, were also reported.

President Zelenskyy said that Ukraine had reached an interception rate of 55% for Russian jet powered drones and 90% for piston powered drones.

=== 27 September ===
Former Commander-in-Chief of Ukrainian Armed Forces General Oleksandr Syrskyi, claimed that Ukraine had developed an active protection system that could intercept 60-80% of FPV drones fired at Ukrainian armoured vehicles.

=== 28 September ===
Presidium of National Academy of Sciences of Ukraine after the attack

A Russian Shahed drone struck the historic building in Kyiv which houses the Presidium of National Academy of Sciences of Ukraine, killing two people and injuring six, including former Secretary of the National Security and Defence Council Volodymyr Horbulin. Attacks on the city injured 24 people and damaged a medical center, pharmaceutical plant and other buildings. Russian strikes also killed 3 and injured 18 in Dnipro, killed 1 in Synelnykove, injured 43 in Kharkiv, injured 32 in Zaporizhzhia, and injured 3 in Odesa.

Russia said that it struck a cargo ship in the Black Sea and another at port in Chornomorsk. Ukrainian attacks set three facilities ablaze in Krasnodar, while defense plants in Tula and Voronezh Oblast were targeted.

Ukrainian forces took Nove, Ridkodub, Katerynivka, Karpivka, and Novomykhailivka, all in Donetsk Oblast.

=== 29 September ===
A Tu-95MS crashed in the Amur region, killing the crew of eight onboard. Three of the dead, Major Andrei Lobanov, Major Andrei Gerasimov and Lieutenant Colonel Fyodor Pavlyukov, were listed by Ukrainian analysts as “participants in or organizers of missile strikes” against Ukraine.

=== 30 September ===
The Russian Ministry of Defense claimed to have encircled and captured Dobropillya and Marine (east of Sumy). However, independent data from the Institute for the Study of War and the Ukrainian battlefield command confirmed that Ukrainian forces successfully repelled these maneuvers while maintaining firm control over both towns.

Ukrainian forces announced that they struck eight Russian ballistic missile launchers, including Iskander and S-400 systems, during September.

== October 2026 ==
=== 1 October ===
Ukraine claimed 46,320 Russian casualties in September, the highest so far in 2026 and the third consecutive month where their casualties exceeded 40,000. This is a 46% increase from January 2026. The ISW reported that for these losses, "Russian forces likely at best gained no ground".

An explosion at the Krasnozavodsk Chemical Plant killed at least seven workers and caused the roof of the plant to collapse. The plant was attacked previously by Ukrainian drones on 20 September 2026 as it makes ammunition for Russian Geran drones.

President Zelenskyy announced that Ukraine used a FP-7 tactical ballistic missile in combat for the first time, at an unspecified target, with the next step being production.

A Russian missile shot down a Ukrainian MiG-29, killing the pilot, Captain Marat Redvanovych Mambetov, over "eastern Ukraine" during a combat mission. At the time he was the flight commander of the 40th Tactical Aviation Brigade.

France started training Ukrainian pilots how to fly the Rafale fighter jet.

A Mi-8 was shot down by a Su-35S, in a friendly fire incident, over Voronezh Oblast killing all three crew onboard. The helicopter was mistaken for a drone.

According to information from the HUR’s I Want to Live program, HUR reported that 45,959 foreign nationals had been recruited into the Russian army as of 1 October 2026.

=== 2 October ===
Ukrainian drones struck oil refineries in both Volgograd and Samara regions, resulting in fires at both facilities.

A Ukrainian Mirage 2000-5F shot down a S8000 Banderol with its onboard 30 mm DEFA 554, in a first kill of its kind.

A car bomb killed the driver of a vehicle in Novomoskovsk, Russia, the driver was believed to have be involved in the war in Ukraine.

Spain, Belgium, and Poland have started transferring 20 mm caliber cannon shells for Ukrainian F-16s to shoot down Russian jet powered drones.

=== 3 October ===
Ukrainian drones struck the windows and balconies of several apartment buildings in Kaluga.

According to Moldovan President, at least five Russian weapons entered and exploded on Moldovan territory, including Banderol missiles and drones.

Ukrainian strikes targeted Iskander missile launch sites in Bryansk Oblast.

Russian Major Alexei Karavaev, Commander of 11th Tank Regiment accused of killing Ukrainian prisoners in 2024 was killed by Ukrainian artillery.

Ukrainian forces took a part of forest northeast of Vovchanski Kuthory, Kharkiv Oblast.

Russia claimed that it took Nesternoi, Rubel Noi, and Vusakaya Yeruga, all in Kharkiv Oblast. The ISW was unable to confirm the advances.

=== 4 October ===
German Chancellor Friedrich Merz visited Kyiv, promising €1 billion for military aid, along with €350 million for energy repairs.

Ukrainian drones struck the Khanskaya air base, striking a Su-34, a Su-35 and aircraft refuelling facilities.

Russian forces struck the Pivnichnyi Bridge in Kyiv, injuring two people.

A Russian strike in Sumy's Kovpakivskyi District killed one person and injured three others, other attacks in Sumy injured 13 people.

A report by the UN Human Rights Office stated that at least 15,280 Ukrainian civilians had been killed or injured during the first eight months of 2026, or 400 every week. This is a 55 percent increase from the same period in 2025. On the frontline, nearly 2,500 civilians were killed or wounded by Russian glide bombs, a 62 percent increase from 2025.

=== 5 October ===
An automated turret, fitted with a M2 Browning machine gun and using artificial intelligence, shot down a Russian Geran-5 drone for the first time.

Russia tested barrage balloons as an anti-drone defence.

Russian drones sunk the Turkish owned ship Royad Mammadov, in the Black Sea while carrying grain from Ukraine to Italy. The captain was killed, while eleven crew members were rescued. A Bulgarian tanker taking grain to Romania was also sunk with 18 crew being rescued.

=== 6 October ===
Ambulances of Kramatorsk city hospital (Donetsk Oblast) after a strike on 6 October

The SBU arrested a man accused of being recruited by the FSB, who was alleged to have set up repeater stations in Kyiv, during late September, to help guide Russian Geran-5 drones and ballistic missiles.

Ukraine announced that its 12 civilians escaped the Russian occupation of Oleshky, due to ongoing starvation in the city.

Ukrainian drones attacked the Volodarsk Linear Production and Dispatch Center, located in Konstantinovo, Moscow Oblast. Moscow Mayor Sergei Sobyanin claimed Ukraine launched 650 drones attacked the capital, with air defences intercepting 105 of them.

The AFRAMAX RIO, a Liberian flagged crude oil tanker, was attacked by drones near Sochi, resulting in a fire breaking out. As of 16 October, the tanker was afloat but had sustained significant damage and was listing to starboard. An oil spill had spread from it, forcing booms to be installed after oil pollution was reported on the coast.

A Russian strike hit ambulances and a multi-storey apartment building in Kramatorsk, killing one woman and injuring four others.

Russia claimed that it took Samoilovka in Zaporizhzhia Oblast.

=== 7 October ===
Apartment building in Pryluky (Chernihiv Oblast) after the strike on 7 October

The Russian Ministry of Defence claimed to have intercepted 311 Ukrainian drones over 17 regions.

According to Ukrainian Prime Minister Serhii Koretskyi, Ukraine received a loan from the EU worth €1.2 Billion as part of the EU's Ukraine Support Loan program.

At least 26 people, including five children were killed in Russian strikes on Ukraine.

A HUR Sargan-3000 USV shot down a "Shahed type attack drone" over the Black Sea with machine guns.

=== 8 October ===
Bus in Kramatorsk after the attack

Gazprom Neftekhim Salavat, in Salavat, was attacked by Ukrainian drones, resulting in a fire. Russian air defenses were active for 12 hours over 20 locations, with over 400 drones involved, with the Russian Ministry of Defense claiming 399 interceptions or suppression. A 57-year-old man was killed during a Ukrainian drone attack on Podolsk, a 37-year-old woman was injured, and flights at Vnukovo, Domodedovo, and Zhukovsky airports were suspended.

Ukrainian forces attacked a Yandex data center and a Sasta machine-tool plant in Sasovo. A large fire reportedly caused "major disruptions" to the Yandex Cloud, including internet connection and power supplies.

Ukrainian FP-1 drones attacked the Omsk refinery, which is about 2,500 kilometers (1,550 miles) from occupied Ukraine. The video of the attack showed smoke, explosions, and fire.

At least 33 people are killed in Russian strikes that hit two passenger buses in Kramatorsk.

South Korea recalled its ambassador to Ukraine after President Zelenskyy revealed that two captured North Korean prisoners had been transferred to South Korea. South Korea claimed it breached a confidential agreement, and while Ukraine offered an apology, it wasn’t the level they expected.

=== 9 October ===
Redkino Experimental Chemical Plant in Tver was attacked by Ukrainian drones. It produces fuel for Kh-101 and Kh-55 cruise missiles plus other chemicals used in Russia’s aviation, aerospace, and other industrial sectors. An oil depot in northern Belgorod was set on fire by Ukrainian drones. The Ukhta oil refinery was also attacked by Ukrainian drones, with black smoke rising from it. A Yandex data center in Kaluga was damaged by an Ukrainian drone attack. The full extent of the damage is unknown.

Mikhail Zvinchuk was arrested, along with his wife, Valeriya, by the Montenegrin police and the Agency for National Security officers. He founded the pro-Kremlin Rybar Telegram channel.

President Putin’s Il-96-300PU, along with several other government Il-96s, was forced to change its flight route due to a Ukrainian drone attack. President Putin’s plane was attempting to land at Vnukovo airport in Moscow, but it was redirected to Pulkovo Airport in St. Petersburg before returning to Vnukovo after flight restrictions were lifted.

=== 10 October ===
Apartment building in Zaporizhzhia after the strike

A Russian strike hit Zaporizhzhia, killing 20 people, including three children.

Russia claimed to have took Lukashovo and Lobanovka in the Kharkiv Oblast.

Two Russian ships in Azov’s port were damaged by drones, with officials refusing to release further information. The Novoshakhtinsk Oil Refinery was set ablaze during a drone attack. Seven out of 12 oil storage tanks were destroyed, with the fire finally extinguished on 12 October.

Ukrainian drones damaged the tracks on a railway bridge in Vygonichsky District, Bryansk Oblast. Service on the Bryansk–Unecha–Gomel line was disrupted, with trains heading to Moscow either being rerouted or replaced by buses along certain sections.

=== 11 October ===
An air defence site in Sochi was attacked by Ukrainian drones, with a fire detected on NASA’s FIRMS. A Yandex data centre in Vladimir Oblast was attacked by Ukrainian drones, resulting in the complete shutdown of the facility and causing some of the company's services to become unavailable.

=== 12 October ===
Apartment building in Kharkiv after missile strike on 12 October

Ukrainian forces shot down a Geran-5 with a new jet interceptor, the second confirmed interception of a Geran-5.

Ukraine fired an FP-7 missile at an undisclosed target in Russia.

The Russians attacked a Roshen factory in Vinnytsia. Two people were injured in Russian strikes in Hlukhiv, while another attack killed one woman and injured seven in Lozova.

A Russian Smerch missile hit a house in Cherkaske, Donetsk Oblast, killing three people, including 13-year-old girl and injuring four, while another strike on Sloviansk injured a 77-year-old woman.

Three people were killed in a Russian drone attack in Ivano-Frankivsk, and four were killed in a missile attack on Kharkiv.

The former chief of the Tula Cartridge plant, Sergei Lukin, was arrested. The factory is a key supplier of ammunition and explosives to Russian forces in Ukraine, which led to the company being sanctioned.

=== 13 October ===
The Ukrainian Air Force claimed that up to 85% of Russian jet-powered drones was being intercepted.

Ukrainian forces struck an Iskander-M maintenance base in Kursk Oblast.

A Russian POW escaped Ukrainian custody in Kharkiv Oblast. While on the run, the Russian soldier was accused of killing five Ukrainian soldiers and one civilian. He was recaptured on 15 October.

=== 14 October ===
Phase four of Operation Vivaldi has concluded, with some 101 square kilometers of territory claimed to have been recaptured by Ukraine and roughly 3,000 Russian losses inflicted.

SpaceX unilaterally restricted speeds on its Starshield terminals to 72 to 161 km/h, while Starlink connectivity speeds showed signs of being throttled, directly affecting Ukrainian military drone operations.

Ukrainian drones set fire to a “major data centre” for Sberbank in Balakovo.

The trial of Ukrainian citizen Serhii Kuznetsov started in Hamburg. Prosecutors accused him of helping to blow up the Nord Stream 2 pipeline. He was charged with war crimes, attacking civilian infrastructure, and “ordering divers and an explosive expert to attack civilian infrastructure.” Meanwhile, Croatia approved the extradition to Germany of Volodymyr Zhuravlov, a second Ukrainian accused of involvement.

=== 15 October ===
Ukrainian forces carried out an attack on Borisoglebsk air base in Russia using R-360 Neptune cruise missiles. Up to six aircraft were claimed destroyed, with later satellite imagery suggesting that at least four Su-34 fighter-bomber aircraft were destroyed.

The Ryazan oil refinery was struck by Ukrainian drones in the first strike after Ukraine observed a three-day ceasefire.

In an interview on Newsmax, President Trump described Ukraine's renewed strikes on Russian energy infrastructure a 'disgrace'. Trump further stated that 'Zelensky is not a good guy for us to deal with', that he was 'not a big fan of Zelensky', and accused the Ukrainian president of destroying the country. Trump went on to disparagingly compare Zelenskyy to the 19th century American showman P. T. Barnum, and called for elections in the country.

=== 16 October ===
Moscow, Rostov, and Vladimir regions were attacked by Ukrainian drones. Yandex's data center in Vladimir Oblast was targeted, with loud explosions reported. The drone strikes resulted in the closure of multiple airports in Moscow, and a fire broke out in the town of Aksay. About 22 airports were closed due to Ukrainian drone attacks, air defense systems were activated, and explosions were reported in various regions, including Smolensk, Tver, Tula, Ryazan, Lipetsk, Kaluga, and Nizhny Novgorod. The Surgut Gas Processing Complex, located in the Khanty-Mansi Autonomous Okrug, was attacked by Ukrainian drones, resulting in a fire.

A series of Russian drone strikes took place in Western Ukraine. Kromberg & Schubert, a manufacturer of electrical wiring, announced the suspension of its plant following the attacks by jet-powered drones. The agricultural firm Ahrofrukt also reported significant damage to its facilities.

=== 17 October ===
Two days before the Lindsey O. Graham Sanctioning Russia and Iran Act of 2026 was to take effect, President Trump signed an executive order waiving the sanctions placed under the act against Russia, in order to facilitate a deal for Russian diesel fuel. White House spokeswoman Taylor Rogers stated that "Enforcing the sanctions provisions now would impede ongoing U.S. efforts to negotiate a durable and comprehensive peace agreement". Secretary of state Rubio confirmed the waiver, stating that more time was necessary to analyze the effects of sanctions and tariffs on the global economy, particularly in regards to India and the Middle East.

Secretary of state Rubio stated that Ukrainian access to SpaceX Starshield was not permitted at the present time, stating: "It's not at this moment available to Ukraine, and that's under conversation". At the same time, Rubio clarified that Starlink is a commercial product, and regulated as such.

Apartment building in Kherson after bombing on 17 October

At least eight people, including a 71-year-old woman were killed and 60 others were wounded in Russian strikes on Ukraine. Russian strikes on Ukrainian electrical infrastructure were reported to have cut power to more than 1 million people.

Wait times for customs processing at Polish-Ukrainian border crossings were reported to take up to 40 hours due to the threat of air alerts.

A group of drones was detected by the Romanian Air Force heading in the southwest direction approximately 120 km east of Snake Island. Two F-16s from the 53rd Fighter Squadron intercepted two drones as they entered Romanian airspace.

Moscow Mayor Sergey Sobyanin claimed that between 10 and 17 October 2026, some 2,730 Ukrainian drones had been neutralized heading towards the Moscow region, while some 534 drones were neutralized approaching Moscow itself, forcing Vnukovo, Domodedovo, and Zhukovsky airports to suspend operations for two days in a row. Moscow's airports had been forced to restrict operations, to varying degrees, for some six nights in a row, resulting in long passenger queues and hundreds of flight delays. The Russian Ministry of Defence claimed that some 4,500 drones had been shot down over various Russian regions during the same period of time.

According to German police, a section of the security fence at Leipzig/Halle Airport was rammed by a vehicle. The destroyed section was close to three Russian An-124 cargo planes that have been grounded by sanctions since 2022. Following the incident, police searched the grounds but did not find a vehicle or any suspects.

=== 18 October ===
Polish and Baltic Airspace incidents - 18 October 2026

On the night of 17-18 October, an air alert was raised in Lithuania and Latvia, with drones detected in the vicinity of the Belarusian border moving from Poland towards Latvia, prompting the temporary suspension of flights from Kaunas Airport. The Lithuanian National Crisis Management centre reported that an explosion had occurred, and that drone debris was found near the village of Juodžionys, Pasvalys District Municipality having possibly entered Lithuanian airspace from Poland. Another drone was reported by residents in the vicinity of the city of Panevėžys.

Possible violations of Polish airspace in Lublin Voivodeship and Podkarpackie Voivodeship were also reported, with sightings of drones reported near the Zemborzycki Reservoir in Lublin city, as well as in Łęczna County. Airports in Lublin and Rzeszow were temporarily suspended.

A fire was reported at the oil terminal of the Port of Saint Petersburg following Ukrainian drone strikes. Several other facilities in the Saint Petersburg were also reportedly attacked, including a VK datacenter, an OZON e-commerce warehouse, as well as a bridge section of the Western High-Speed Diameter. Damage to apartment blocks, parked cars and electrical infrastructure was also reported.

Prime Minister Péter Magyar said that he was prepared to allow Ukraine to transit its grain through Hungary. However, the trains must be sealed and allowed only for transit to a third country. This potentially reverses a ban on the transit of Ukrainian agricultural products put in place by former Prime Minister Viktor Orbán. Attempts to ship the grain via the Black Sea have become too dangerous due to Russian drone attacks.

President Zelenskyy said that the United States had started sharing intelligence again with Ukraine.

Lithuania claimed to have foiled an arson attack on a Starlink station in the country, with authorities alleging that Russia was responsible.

=== 19 October ===
Kyiv was attacked with ballistic missiles. No casualties were reported, but there was damage to metro stations on the left bank of the Dnipro River, railway tracks, and power infrastructure, according to Kyiv Mayor Vitali Klitschko. According to journalists from The Kyiv Independent, unlike the previous night’s attack, a warning was sent to residents before the strike occurred, allowing them to seek shelter.

The Ukrainian telecommunications company DataGroup reported the destruction of its data center in Kyiv, stating that repairs or resumption of operations at the site were impossible. The company announced that it would continue limited operations from backup infrastructure.

A Russian spacecraft, 'Kosmos 2612,' came within 26 meters of ICEYE-X36, a US-registered satellite that provides intelligence to the Armed Forces of Ukraine. The reason for the approach is unclear. ICEYE-X36 is fitted with a synthetic aperture radar that provides images of the Earth's surface at a resolution of up to 25 cm.

Coffee shop in Nova Vodolaha park after the attack

A Russian strike in a park in Nova Vodolaha killed seven people, including three children.

Russian-installed Luhansk governor claimed that three people were killed in a Ukrainian strike in the oblast.

A 41-year-old Ukrainian man was called into the Pechersk Territorial Recruitment Center on suspicion of breaching mobilization laws. He produced a pistol and fired seven times, wounding six people, two of whom are in critical condition. Three of the injured were police officers and three were military personnel. The man has been arrested.

=== 20 October ===
Apartment building in Kramatorsk (Donetsk Oblast) after bombing on 20 October

Four people were killed and six others were wounded in a Russian attack on Kramatorsk.

A Ukrainian soldier was medically evacuated by UAV in what is called the world's first case of a soldier lifted directly from his position by a drone. A modified hexacopter, normally used for dropping cargo or munitions, was deployed because a ground rescue was too dangerous due to Russian drones.

The Wall Street Journal reported that Elon Musk ordered a deliberate speed cap on military-grade Starlink hardware in Ukraine. One person familiar with the matter claimed that Musk consulted with President Donald Trump and other senior administration officials prior to enforcing the restriction, despite some U.S. officials maintaining that Musk acted unilaterally.

Ukrainian drones attacked an oil pumping station near Michurinsk, resulting in a fire.

The GigaCenter datacenter, operating services for the telecommunications, cloud services and cybersecurity for GIGAGROUP in Kyiv was destroyed following a Russian strike.

=== 21 October ===
Apartment building in Kyiv, damaged by an attack on 21 October

A Russian attack hit a residential building in Sviatoshynskyi district of Kyiv, killing at least two people and wounded others.

Ukrainian drones struck energy infrastructure in Chystiakove. Blackouts were reported in Krasnoperekopsk, Crimea, following attacks on the train system. Separately, a telecommunications tower in Luhansk was attacked.

President Putin announced that Stephen Hubbard, a 74-year-old retired American teacher who had been imprisoned by Moscow on charges of serving as a foreign combatant for Ukraine, was released.

According to Ukrainian figures, Russia lost 2,250 troops killed and wounded in a single day, the highest losses for Russian forces since the full-scale war started.

=== 22 October ===
Train in Kharkiv after the attack on 22 October

A Russian strike hit a passenger train in Kharkiv, causing a fire.

A Russian strike in Kyiv caused damage to monastery buildings, residential buildings, shops, cafes and other civilian infrastructure.

A Ukrainian infiltration operation near Kupiansk via gas pipelines captured 30 Russians and inflicted 100 casualties.

Ukrainian drones struck the 75th Arsenal in Serpukhov, a facility that maintains Buk and S-300V missile systems.

Ukrainian drones struck Lipetsk; fire from the drones and air defenses damaged the windows and facades of multiple residential buildings.

The SBU arrested a Ukrainian Navy sailor in the Mykolaiv region who had gone AWOL. Before doing so, he had posted roughly ten geotagged videos of Ukrainian military positions on TikTok.

Ukraine's Ministry of Defence claimed to have destroyed 408,000 Russian drones since the start of 2026, including 58,000 over the past month.

=== 23 October ===
Ukrainian drones struck the Federal Taxation Service data centre in Gorodets—one of the two main hubs that store and process data from Russian government registers, including centralized tax databases. Ukrainian drone and balloon attacks caused the cancellation of some 340 flights in and out of Moscow's four airports: Vnukovo, Domodedovo, Sheremetyevo, and Zhukovsky. Other flights were rerouted after a fixed-wing drone crashed at Sheremetyevo Airport. Ukrainian missiles, possibly Storm Shadow or Flamingo missiles, struck the Proton plant in Oryol, destroying a production workshop and potentially causing personnel casualties.

Denmark supplied more than 50,000 rounds of 20 mm caliber cannon ammunition to Ukraine, equipping its F-16 aircraft to intercept Russian strike drones.

Ukrainian forces launched a missile strike targeting the Baltimore Military Air Base in Voronezh, hitting an aircraft parking area used by Russian Su-34 bomber aircraft.

The air forces of the United Kingdom and France carry out their first-ever joint simulation of an airborne nuclear strike over the Mediterranean Sea amid persistent regional security concerns resulting from the war. The drills, code-named "Exercise Rummy," involve the integration of French Rafale warplanes with British RAF Typhoon fighters.

The White House announced that Russia and Ukraine had agreed to a ceasefire negotiated by US First Lady Melania Trump in Russian-occupied city of Oleshky. Both sides agreed to temporarily cease military action around the city to allow for the supply of humanitarian aid and the evacuation of civilians, amid a deepening food crisis. Ukraine had stated that Russia bears responsibility for the humanitarian crisis in the occupied town. Russia has acknowledged severe supply constraints, but blames Ukraine for obstructing the supply of deliveries. Separately, Russia and Ukraine carried out an exchange of POWs and civilians in a 270-for-270 exchange, brokered by the United States and United Arab Emirates.

US President Donald Trump confirmed that Starlink service has been restored for Ukraine.

Rescue ships near the capsized Khoryv, view from a French Atlantique 2

The Ukrainian owned, Comoros flagged cargo ship Khoryv capsized and sank after being hit in a drone strike in the Black Sea. The ship was located at a distance of 13 nautical miles (24 kilometers) from the port city of Constanța, slightly beyond Romanian territorial waters. The crew consisted of thirteen Ukrainian and Azeri sailors. Nine sailors were rescued by the Romanian Border Police, while the death of one Ukrainian sailor was confirmed by the Ukrainian Ministry of Foreign Affairs. Four Ukrainian citizens, including the captain were hospitalised for treatment. Three sailors remained missing. Romanian President Nicușor Dan accused Russia of escalating the conflict in the Black Sea region.

A Russian strike on Chernihiv killed another person and wounded at least 25 others.

A Russian assault in Kramatorsk killed one person and injured six others, including a 22-month-old boy, a 7-year-old girl, and a 10-year-old girl. In nearby Sloviansk, Russian bombings killed an elderly woman and injured four others.

Oryol Governor Andrey Klychkov claimed that three people were killed in a Ukrainian strike on an unidentified facility.

=== 24 October ===
Cow farm in Sumy Oblast after an attack on 24 October

A Russian strike hit a farm in Sumy Oblast, killing a woman and wounding four others. The strike also killed and injured cattle housed there.

A Russian strike in Dnipropetrovsk Oblast injured four civilians, including a 14-year-child child.

A Russian attack in Lozova killed one person and injured two others.

Ukraine struck the Togliattikauchuk petrochemical plant in Tolyatti, a major synthetic rubber manufacturer. The mayor claimed that the strike damaged the facility without causing casualties. Ukrainian drones struck two targets in Omsk, the Omsky Kauchuk petrochemical plant and the local Ozon warehouse, with fires being reported by Ukrainian monitoring channels.

Russian-installed officials in occupied Crimea reported electricity cuts following overnight Ukrainian strikes.

Russia claimed that it downed a SCALP cruise missile, four Neptune missiles and 1,297 Ukrainian fixed-wing drones.

President Zelenskyy said that Ukraine had only received 24 Patriot missiles over the last 90 days from the United States.

Starshield services were reported to have been restored to full capacity, a status confirmed by the Ukrainian government. Elon Musk claimed that the Ukrainian military "violated Starlink terms of service and used it for offensive drone strikes to kill people," adding that "that loophole was closed last week." The Ukrainian government denied this claim.

=== 25 October ===
Ukrainian drones hit the MegaGRINN shopping centre in Belgorod, setting it on fire, killing three person and injuring 13. Ukrainian drones attacked the AVISMA chemical and metallurgical plant in Berezniki, which manufactures titanium for use in Russian military equipment. The resulting fire injured five people. Ukrainian cruise missiles struck the Energia plant in Yelets.

The Ukrainian home improvement hypermarket chain Epicentr K reported the destruction of malls in Kharkiv, Zaporizhzhia, Vinnytsia and Poltava. The press service of the company described the strikes as the "total destruction of its network."

=== 26 October ===
Ukrainian drones may have struck the Voronezhsintezkauchuk petrochemical plant in Voronezh, with explosions and smoke reported over the city.

=== 27 October ===
Russia attacked Kyiv with 16 ballistic missiles and almost 280 drones, hitting the South Bridge.

Russian strikes resulted in fatalities and injuries in Kharkiv and Pavlohrad.

Russian-installed officials in Zaporizhzhia Oblast claimed that a drone strike on a bus killed one person and wounded 30 others.

A drone strike in Bryansk killed one person and injured six others.

An Indonesian national, Taufiq Muhammad, fighting in the Russian army was killed in the Donetsk region by Ukrainian forces. The HUR claimed it was his first battle after a week and a half of training.

=== 28 October ===
Ukrainian drones attacked the Novolipetsk Metallurgical Plant in Lipetsk, resulting in a large-scale fire breaking out. The Azot chemical plant in Novomoskovsk was also set on fire by Ukrainian drones.

The first confirmed Botswana national, Pako Namogang, was killed in the Luhansk region while fighting for Russian forces in Ukraine.

The SBU captured two Russian soldiers previously convicted of murder who had deserted their positions in the grey zone. Disguised as civilians, the pair were hitchhiking toward Kyiv, where one hoped to stay with relatives, when they were intercepted at a checkpoint outside Dnipro.

=== 29 October ===
A ZIM chartered ship sank overnight after being struck by three marine drones off Bulgaria's Black Sea coast.

Rail platform in Dnipro after the attack

15 people were killed in a Russian strike that hit a rail platform in Dnipro.

A Russian strike in Chernihiv killed two 15-year-old children and wounded 23 others, including four children.

A Russian strike in Kremenchuk killed three people and injured 32 others.

A Neptune missile strike destroyed two Su-34s at the Marinovka Air Base. An Iskander missile launcher was also struck by Ukrainian forces. 600 Ukrainian drones attacked airports in both Moscow and St. Petersburg; 231 were claimed to have been shot down while approaching Moscow. Over 400 flights were delayed or cancelled in both Moscow and St. Petersburg.

The Bashkir Soda Company in Sterlitamak was attacked by Ukrainian drones, leaving smoke rising over the premises. The company is Russia's sole manufacturer of chemicals used to make body armour for the Russian army.

Five Ukrainian civilians were evacuated from Russian-occupied areas.

Ukrainian General Staff claimed that 49,040 Russian personnel were "lost" during the month of October, marking the highest monthly loss since the beginning of the full-scale war.

=== 30 October ===
US Army Lieutenant General Brett Sylvia was relieved of command after being accused of sharing classified information about the war with journalists.

Based on open-source material, research published by the Ukrainian research group KIU claimed that some 9,000 Russian officers had been killed in action since the start of the full-scale war.

The Novokuybyshevsk Oil Refinery was attacked by Ukrainian drones, amid reports of gunfire from air defence units, multiple drones flying overhead, and "widespread fires in the vicinity of the refinery." The attack has been called the "resumption of strikes" by Ukraine on Russian oil refineries after the US government pressured Kyiv into a suspension of such attacks. A Russian food company, Konservsushprod, was attacked in Starodub, which supplies “Russian security agencies and the Armed Forces” with field and canned rations.

The 3rd Assault Brigade destroyed a Russian Mi-8 using Hornet drones “dozens of kilometres” behind the frontline in the Luhansk Region.

The Trump administration approved a sale of 500 PAC-3 missiles and spare parts to Ukraine.

=== 31 October ===
Kramatorsk City Council, destroyed on 31 October

A Russian strike in Kramatorsk destroyed its city council building.

The Bashneft-Novoil oil refinery was attacked by Ukrainian Liutyi drones, setting the 'L-35 catalytic reforming unit' on fire. Ukrainian balloons carrying drones attacked Moscow airports, forcing flight cancellations. One drone struck Sheremetyevo Airport's fuel storage facility, causing a fire to break out. A chemical company in Kamensk-Shakhtinsky was attacked by Ukrainian drones and Neptune missiles, damaging four production workshops and starting a fire at the finished goods warehouse. The Ukrainian General Staff claimed the company made solid rocket propellant used for Russian MLRS systems.

Over 750 residents of Oleshky were repatriated to Ukraine after travelling through Russia and Belarus.

== November 2026 ==
=== 1 November ===
The oil refinery in Kstovo was attacked by Ukrainian drones, resulting in a fire near the processing units.

The Ukrainian General Staff claimed that Russia lost 54,400 personnel during October 2026, marking the worst losses in a single month. Ukrainian officials claimed Russia lost 2,500 soldiers (either killed or wounded), the highest daily toll since the full-scale war began.

Hundreds of thousands of households in Ukraine were left without power when Russia struck electricity infrastructure in four Ukrainian oblasts overnight, capitalizing on a shortage of ballistic missile interceptors.

Ukraine's public air raid alert app sent false alerts after it was hacked. The false alerts included warnings about radiation and chemical threats, street fighting, and the launch of an Oreshnik missile. On the evening of 2 November, unknown hackers gained access to Russia's Emergency Services App, falsely stating that P1-SUN missiles, fitted with nuclear warheads, had been launched at regions of Russia. President Zelenskyy confirmed that Ukraine was responsible.

Russia formally withdrew from the European Convention for the Prevention of Torture and Inhuman or Degrading Treatment or Punishment, terminating its mandate to inspect domestic detention facilities.

=== 2 November ===
Ruins of a air raid shelter in Komyshuvakha after an attack

Ukrainian drones struck an oil pumping and dispatch station in Samara Oblast, causing a fire.

A Russian strike hit an aid site and bomb shelter in a school in Komyshuvakha (Zaporizhzhia Oblast), killing at least 72 people, wounding 5, with 4 more missing. This was one of the deadliest attacks since the beginning of the war.

=== 3 November ===
Russia claimed that power networks in Vinnytsia, Dnipropetrovsk, and Kharkiv, as well as maritime docks and military-affiliated ships in Odesa, were successfully targeted by its overnight strikes.

Russia claimed that it intercepted 856 Ukrainian drones overnight, 496 of which were launched at Moscow. Ukrainian drones attacked the Yaroslavl oil refinery, sparking three separate fires within the facility. Yaroslavl Governor claimed that two people were injured in the strike. Ukrainian drones strikes in Moscow resulted in explosions and the cancellation of flights from Moscow’s airports.

73 people were wounded in a Russian strike that hit a medical facility in Nemyshlianskyi District of Kharkiv.

Two people were killed and 20 others were wounded in a Russian strike in Dnipro.

Iuliia Mendel, President Zelensky's press secretary from 2019 to 2021 was charged in absentia for treason.

The Russian MoD has proposed a draft order to postpone December 2026 payments until January 2027 for service members not serving in Ukraine. Meanwhile, the St. Petersburg military enlistment office has sharply reduced its signing bonuses: cutting them from 3.5 million rubles (roughly $43,224) before October 2026, down to 1 million rubles (roughly $12,350) in mid-October, and further slashing them to 400,000 rubles (roughly $4,940) starting 3 November.

=== 4 November ===
Historical building of Sloviansk City Hospital after bombing on 4 November

A Russian strike destroyed a disused hospital in Sloviansk. The building was an architectural landmark dating back to 1909.

President Zelenskyy awarded the Order of Princess Olga to US First Lady Melania Trump for her significant personal contribution to humanitarian support for Ukraine.

Proposals for an Extended Range Attack Munition (ERAM), an air-launched cruise missile intended for Ukraine, were requested by the US Air Force. The requirements include a minimum range of 460 kilometers (290 miles), speeds exceeding Mach 0.6, GPS-independent navigation, and 1,000 units finished within 15 months of contract award.

Ukrainian drones struck telecommunications equipment belonging to the Russian telecom company Phoenix in Donetsk. The equipment had previously belonged to the Ukrainian company Kyivstar until it was seized in 2015. An OZON logistics center in Adygeysk was attacked by Ukrainian drones, resulting in a fire.

The autumn offensive in the Donbas was halted by Russian General Staff Chief Valery Gerasimov because of command-directed fuel reallocations, according to unconfirmed reports based on analysis by Ukrainian military analyst Mykhailo Rohoza.

=== 5 November ===
In Ryazan, a Wildberries facility and a Rosneft oil refinery were attacked by Ukrainian drones.

The National Anti-Corruption Bureau of Ukraine and the Specialized Anti-Corruption Prosecutor's Office, as part of the "Carthage Investigation" accused several members of the SBU and the Ukrainian National Guard with involvement in criminal activities.

=== 6 November ===
The Afipsky refinery was attacked by Ukrainian drones, which started a fire. Locals reported explosions and activity from local air defence.

HUR tested a flamethrower mounted on a UGV.

The Kharkiv Regional Prosecutor’s Office has charged two Russian soldiers—one in custody and another in absentia. In summer 2026, the duo and two others escaped custody and forced a Ukrainian man at gunpoint to drive them to the frontline. Two were killed by Ukrainian forces, one was recaptured, and the last escaped.

Officials throughout Europe reported a new wave of bomb threats against several planes and media outlets, following a number of hoaxes that have prompted flight delays that week, with European governments and officials pointing to a possible Russian-backed hybrid operation.

A Russian military pilot, 28-year-old Senior Lieutenant Artem Snyezhkov, was found unconscious after being shot in an apparent attempted assassination at the Tambov air base. The Investigative Committee of Russia has opened a criminal case into attempted murder. The air base is used to train pilots and navigators for the Tu-22M3 and Tu-160 bombers.

A Ukrainian F-16 pilot shot down 8 Russian attack drones using only his fighter’s 20mm M61A1 Vulcan cannon, with ammunition to spare. The pilot, who serves with the 107th Separate Aviation Wing, then broke his own record a few days later by shooting down nine drones, again with rounds remaining. The exact dates of the sorties were unknown; it was only known that the information was released at the International Fighter Conference 2026 in Munich on 6 November 2026.

=== 7 November ===
Kindergarten in Kyiv after an attack

Ukrainian Neptune missiles attacked the 'Proton' industrial cluster in Oryol. The plant builds components for various Russian missile systems, including Iskander-M, S-71 'Kover' cruise missiles, and Pantsir-S1 systems. A fire broke out at the Almaz military factory in Rostov, and the Saratov Oil Refinery was also struck during drone attacks. Drone attacks were also reported over Belgorod, with debris falling on residential buildings. Ukrainian forces struck two Iskander missile launchers and a Pantsir-S1 in Bryansk Oblast. The extent of the damage was still being assessed. A joint Ukrainian strike on a Rubicon drone base in Berdyansk took out trained specialists who instructed operators and passed on their experience.

A Russian overnight strike in Kyiv killed one person, injured eight others, including a child, and damaged the Northern Bridge and energy infrastructure. 4 out of 36 ballistic missiles, which included North Korean munitions, were intercepted.

Hacker groups called “Belarusian Cyberpartisans and Silent Crow” broke into Rosstat's database. Rosstat's internal database showed that between 394,000 and 450,000 Russians had been killed in Ukraine, or died from causes linked to the conflict, between February 2022 and August 2026. The figures have not been independently confirmed.

The Russian MoD released the first footage of a Mi-28NM carrying two S8000 Banderol (or Dan-T) cruise missiles and firing one at targets in Ukraine.

Ukrainian prosecutors charged a 19-year-old Ukrainian woman with murder. They alleged that she was recruited by the FSB to kill a 32-year-old Colombian national who had previously served in the armed forces of Colombia and then Ukraine. He was unemployed at the time because his contract had expired. While they were drinking alcohol, the woman allegedly poisoned his drink and killed him. Prosecutors alleged that she was paid $1,000 for the murder.

=== 8 November ===
The Ukrainian 34th Marine Brigade claimed to have established a presence on the left bank of the Dnipro River in the Kherson Oblast, in an unnamed settlement.

Ukrainian drones damaged a bridge over the Mius River in Rostov Oblast.

According to the General Staff of the Armed Forces of Ukraine, Russian forces suffered 2,980 personnel killed or severely wounded that day, the highest single-day total reported since the start of the war.

=== 9 November ===
Ukrainian drones attacked the Kirishi oil refinery, triggering a fire. The local governor, Aleksandr Drozdenko, confirmed the attack and said 113 drones had been intercepted. Ukrainian drones also struck the JSC Morozov Plant in Imeni Morozova, damaging three production workshops. The plant manufactures explosives and solid rocket propellant used in missiles such as the Iskander-M. Ukrainian drones attacked the 123rd Aircraft Repair Plant in Staraya Russa, starting a fire. The plant repairs aircraft engines and provides maintenance for various aircraft including Il-76, Il-78, and L-410. Later satellite photos indicated that an Il-76 was damaged at Staraya Russa Airport.

Russian media reported fuel restrictions in a number of regions. In Krasnoyarsk Krai, fuel was rationed per customer to 30 litres of AI-95, 50 litres of AI-92 gasoline, and 100 litres of diesel. In the Republic of Karelia, the Republic of Buryatia, Zabaykalsky Krai, and Novosibirsk Oblast, limitations of 30 to 50 litres of gasoline were reported.

A drone strike killed an employee of the Zaporizhzhia Nuclear Power Plant, according to the IAEA.

=== 10 November ===
Ukrainian drones struck the Donetsk International Airport again because Russian forces were using it as a base for attacks against Ukraine. The airport has been occupied by Russian forces since 2014.

The Australian Broadcasting Corporation reported that a 38-year-old former security guard from Queensland, Daryl Fladung, traveled to Russia in April to join the Russian Army and fight in Ukraine. He has been missing for five months and is believed to be dead.

Robert Brovdi, commander of the Unmanned Systems Forces, said that Ukrainian drones attacked the Dorogobuzh chemical plant in Smolensk Oblast.

=== 11 November ===
Ukrainian drones struck the port of Ust-Luga and damaged a residential building in Tver. Another residential building was damaged in the Adygea Republic after electronic warfare suppressed a drone. A Russian Kamov Ka-52 attack helicopter and its two crew members were lost during the attack Ust-Luga, in a suspected friendly fire incident involving Russian air defenses that also reportedly downed a MiG-31 fighter jet and an Mi-8 helicopter, according to Ukrainian defense adviser Serhii Sternenko and Russian military aviation Telegram channels. Ukrainian drones from the SBU Alpha unit also struck the Buyan-M-class corvette Naro-Fominsk near Gogland Island.

The Omsk Oil Refinery, located 2,500 km (1,600 mi) from Ukraine, was also struck by Ukrainian drones in a strike noted for being more sustained than previous ones; it lasted over eight hours and triggered a massive fire.

Following the first day of trilateral negotiations in the United Arab Emirates, Russia and Ukraine decided to swap at least 1,000 POWs from each country.

Bloomberg, citing leaked confidential figures from Rosstat, reported that 11,335 foreign fighters have died fighting for Russia since 24 February 2022. According to the report, there was an over eightfold increase in these deaths, from 630 in 2022 to more than 5,500 in 2025.

Italy may suspend or sharply limit deliveries of Aster missiles for Ukraine's SAMP/T air defense systems because it needs to preserve its own stockpiles and faces slow defense production.

Two Russian S8000 Banderol cruise missiles crossed into Moldovan airspace.

=== 12 November ===
A colonel of the 6th Guards Air and Air Defence Forces Army was killed in a car bombing in St. Petersburg. He was reportedly the chief navigator for the formation.

President Zelenskyy stated that speed limits had been placed on Starshield connections across the frontline for several days, with the system ceasing to function above 100 mph (161 km/h).

=== 13 November ===
Institute of Traumatology and Orthopedics in Kyiv damaged by fragments of a drone

Moscow Mayor Sergey Sobyanin claimed that 105 drones were intercepted over the city and that falling debris caused damage. Flights at Moscow’s airports were subsequently suspended. Ukrainian drones also struck an oil refinery in Volgograd and an oil production facility in Rostov-on-Don. Ukrainian Neptune missiles struck three targets in Rostov, hitting a production facility, a maintenance facility, and a storage area for drones. Ukrainian drones attacked three radar systems in the Leningrad Oblast: a Nebo-SVU surveillance radar, a Sopka-2 radar complex, and a 40V6 mobile antenna tower. Ukrainian drones struck the LUKOIL-Volgogradneftepererabotka oil refinery in Volgograd, leading to a fire spanning over 3,500 square meters. Lipetsk air base was also attacked by Ukrainian drones, which struck aircraft maintenance facilities, fuel storage, and control equipment.

A car bomb in the Chertanovo area of Moscow injured Sergei Zavorotniy, a one-time spokesman for pro-Russian former Ukrainian prime minister Mykola Azarov.

President Zelenskyy announced that Ukraine had completed its part in developing an interceptor missile for the FREYJA air defense system, and the first component finished by international partners was the Danish illumination radar.

A Russian strike in Kyiv damaged the National Institute of Traumatology and Orthopedics, injuring three patients.

=== 14 November ===
A Ukrainian drone attack reportedly killed a mother, a father, and their two-year-old daughter in Proletarsky, Belgorod Oblast.

=== 15 November ===
A document from the authorities in the Republic of Bashkortostan acknowledged that fewer people were prepared to sign military contracts, while at the same time, total funding for the payments was reduced from 13.6 billion to 12.6 billion roubles as a budgetary saving measure.

Ukrainian drones set fire to a petrochemical plant in Nizhnekamsk that manufactures rubber-based products and had previously been attacked in August. Ukrainian drones attacked electrical substations and a bridge in Taganrog, cutting power to the Taganrog-Passenger and Mikhailovka railway stations. The local governor claimed that the “chief electrical engineer” was killed and four others were injured. 30 explosions were reported at the Akhtubinsk Air Base during an attack on aviation equipment.

Unidentified drones struck three civilian ships near the entrance to the Sulina branch, off the coast of Romania, between 14 and 15 November.

=== 16 November ===
Ukrainian drones struck four industrial facilities in Azov, including an oil depot that caught fire. About 600 drones were reported near Moscow, according to Moscow Mayor Sergei Sobyanin. About 191 were intercepted on the approach to Moscow, while airports in the capital suspended operations. Ukrainian forces struck the Crimean Bridge, reportedly causing minor damage to one of its arches and forcing temporary traffic restrictions.

Radio France Internationale reported that French soldiers had been operating in Ukraine for the past several months though their deployment was reported to be limited to operations behind the frontline such as training Ukrainian soldiers and maintaining military equipment.

The Somlian-flagged cargo ship, Betul 8, capsized and sank after being struck by two Russian drones in the Black Sea about 40 nautical miles (74 km) southeast of Cape Kaliakra. The crew was rescued.

=== 17 November ===
The Crimean Bridge after the 16 and 17 November explosions

The Crimean Bridge was struck by Flamingo missiles, and video on social media showed one of the structure's arches and roadway between two supports completely gone, with debris visible below.

The Gas Husky, a Liberian-flagged propane tanker, was sunk after being struck by four Russian drones in the Black Sea approximately 50 nautical miles (93 km) off Byala, 55 nautical miles (102 km) southeast of Varna, Bulgaria. The crew was rescued by a Cougar helicopter.

=== 18 November ===
Ukrainian drones attacked the Ilsky and Afipsky oil refineries, damaging oil tanks at Ilsky and an oil processing unit at Afipsky.

Germany announced it would provide radars to Ukraine for use with the Freyja anti-ballistic missile system. No details were given about the number of radars, specific models, or delivery dates.

Russia tested a new Geran-6, capable of reaching speeds of up to 1,000 km/h. The GUR claimed the increase in speed was to prevent it from being downed by Ukrainian interceptor drones.

=== 19 November ===
Ukrainian forces struck the Crimean Bridge for a third time this week, suspending all traffic. An unspecified number of Neptune missiles were fired at the Crimean Bridge to destroy the remaining operational rail section, marking the third attack in four days. However, the damage was limited to only one of the two sets of tracks.

China tightened export controls on certain components used in Russian attack drones, requiring export licenses for specific jet and electric engines, high-power radio modules, speed controllers, and brushless electric motors.

=== 20 November ===
The Dorogobuzh chemical plant in Smolensk Oblast was hit by Ukrainian drones, resulting in explosions and a fire. Ukrainian drones struck the Kaleikino Oil Pumping Station near Almetyevsk, hitting three oil storage tanks—each with a 50,000-cubic-meter capacity—setting one on fire and damaging the other two. The Ukrainian 8th Air Assault Corps struck Rubicon-S bases in Rylsk, Russia.

President Zelenskyy said that Ukrainian forces struck three Russian Iskander-M launchers, destroying one and damaging two.

Two Russian missiles, including a Kh-101, and a jet-powered drone crossed into Polish airspace from Ukraine before crashing. The strikes occurred during a NATO–Polish military exercise. A Swedish Gripen pilot tried to shoot down one of the missiles but couldn’t identify it due to bad weather.

Russian strikes damaged three bridges in Kyiv, killing at least nine people.

The 42nd Separate Mechanized Brigade stopped a Russian horseback assault using a mixture of landmines and drones.

=== 21 November ===
Two drones struck the Kaliningrad-bound Russian cargo vessel Sparta II in the Gulf of Finland, three nautical miles from Russia's maritime border, setting it ablaze and causing it to drift into Finnish territorial waters, prompting the evacuation of its crew. Unknown drones attacked the port of Baltiysk as Russian air raid sirens sounded, air defense fired, and drone engines hummed overhead. Russia accused Latvia of allowing its airspace to be used during the attack.

=== 22 November ===
Ukrainian drones struck the Rosgvardiya headquarters in Krasnodar Krai, sparking a fire. The Afipsky oil refinery was also attacked, with explosions reported.

Suspected Ukrainian sea drones struck the Russian Steregushchiy-class corvette Merkury while it was docked for refueling in Benghazi, territory held by Russian-backed commander Khalifa Haftar, destroying the corvette. Russian forces managed to intercept four naval drones, but two struck the Merkury. Two other vessels were also damaged.
