= 2026 Kyiv SBU–HUR shootout =

Shooting between Ukrainian intelligence agencies

2026 Kyiv shootout between SBU and HUR
- Part of the timeline of the Russo-Ukrainian war (1 September 2026 – present)
- Date: September 2, 2026; 2 months ago
- Location: Yuriia Shumskoho street, Dniprovskyi District, Kyiv, Ukraine; 50.4248°N 30.6029°E
- Caused by: SBU detention of Russian Volunteer Corps deputy commander Stepan Kaplunov
- Result: Kaplunov released; Dismissals in both agencies announced; Investigation ongoing

Parties
Security Service of Ukraine	Defence Intelligence of Ukraine

Casualties and losses
0	3 injured

On the morning of 2 September 2026, a shootout occurred in the Dniprovskyi District of Kyiv, Ukraine, between the Security Service of Ukraine (SBU) and Defence Intelligence of Ukraine (HUR), injuring three HUR officers. The shootout happened during an SBU search of the home of Stepan Kaplunov, deputy commander of the Russian Volunteer Corps (RDK), a HUR unit of Russians fighting for Ukraine in the ongoing Russo-Ukrainian war. The SBU had detained Kaplunov days before the search and accused him of working with the Russian Federal Security Service (FSB); Kaplunov denied this and accused the SBU of attempting to discredit HUR figures. The incident is under investigation.

== Incident ==
Overnight and into the morning of 2 September, social media reports emerged of a shooting on Yuriia Shumskoho street in Kyiv's Dniprovskyi district. On the morning of 2 September, the street was closed by Kyiv police. The gunfight was between the Security Service of Ukraine (SBU) and Defence Intelligence of Ukraine (HUR), and injured three HUR service members, two seriously. Ukrainska Pravda published video of the shooting.

Early reports linked the shooting to the disappearance of Stepan Kaplunov, deputy commander of the Russian Volunteer Corps (RDK), a unit under the HUR of Russian citizens fighting for Ukraine in the ongoing Russo-Ukrainian war. The RDK had said the previous day that Kaplunov had been "abducted by unknown individuals in the courtyard of his home" "several days ago", and that the RDK had contacted the HUR, SBU and State Bureau of Investigation. Reports later emerged that the shooting had happened during a search of Kaplunov's home.

After the shooting, Kaplunov said he was taken away by members of the HUR's Tymur Special Unit, which the RDK belongs to. On the afternoon of 2 September, Kaplunov's lawyer Taras Borovskyi announced that Kaplunov had been released.

== Explanations ==
=== Statements by SBU ===
On the morning of 2 September, as the shooting was ongoing, the SBU published a statement that it and the HUR had thwarted an attack by Russia's Federal Security Service (FSB) on a Russian opposition figure who had travelled to Ukraine for Ukraine's Independence Day. The media outlet Babel said this figure was Akhmed Zakayev, citing its own sources.

On 3 September, the SBU accused Kaplunov of having contact with the FSB, and published a video showing Kaplunov's apparent confession, as well as alleged screenshots from his phone. The SBU said Kaplunov had been tasked with assassinating a Russian opposition leader who was travelling to Ukraine, as well as with "eliminating" other Ukrainian personnel.

The SBU said its officers had come under "armed attack" by people trying to prevent a search, and that it had deployed the Alpha Group, wounding some of the people resisting the search and detaining the "attackers", who "belong to a unit from Ukraine's defence forces".

=== Statements by Kaplunov ===
On the evening of 2 September, before the SBU's 3 September statement, Kaplunov gave an interview to The New Voice of Ukraine, in which he denied the SBU's allegations and said he had confessed under duress. He said he had been detained by SBU officers on 23 August and pushed into a car without being shown any documents or charges. He said he was held for nine days, taken to a "secret prison", and interrogated under pressure, including death threats.

Kaplunov said that on 1 September, he was taken by SBU officers back to his apartment. He said that HUR personnel from the Tymur Special Unit, which the RDK is part of, were already in the apartment to provide "security", such as against attempts to plant evidence during the search. He then heard the shootout from inside his apartment, and was taken away "by force" by Tymur unit members, which he said he was "enormously grateful" to them for.

Kaplunov's lawyer Taras Borovskyi told Radio Free Europe/Radio Liberty that Kaplunov had been "abducted" on 23 August "without a detention record or legal counsel", and his location had been unknown until the morning of 2 September. Borovskyi also said HUR personnel had already been in the apartment when the SBU brought Kaplunov there for a search, and "comrades and supporters of the HUR's Tymur Special Unit" subsequently "began arriving", after which "the first groups that came here were attacked". The New York Times quoted a statement from Borovskyi that although SBU and HUR commanders had "agreed on how to complete the investigation without hindrance" at first, SBU personnel then detained some HUR officers, causing shooting on the street to begin at about 8.30 am.

On 3 September, Kaplunov published a second video through the RDK's social media. He said the SBU was using its allegations against him to target the Tymur unit's deputy commander Dmytro Ivanov, as well as former HUR head Kyrylo Budanov (now head of the Office of the President of Ukraine). He accused the SBU of attempting to plant items in his home after his disappearance; the RDK later posted footage it said was from 24 August, showing men "wearing hoods and caps and carrying a large bag" allegedly heading to Kaplunov's apartment.

=== Statements by RDK and HUR ===
The RDK's commander Denis Kapustin said to the Kyiv Independent that the SBU's operation had been "an attempt to exert pressure outside the bounds of the law in order to make Stepan [Kaplunov] falsely implicate his commanders, which could then have served as grounds for further action".

The Times published an article including an interview with Kapustin and an account of the shootout. According to this account, a "heavily armed SBU team" had brought Kaplunov to his apartment to search it on the evening of 1 September, where they found "a small group of HUR fighters on guard". The HUR "called for backup", and their agents were "shot at by the SBU, and handcuffed". By the morning of 2 September, more SBU, HUR and RDK personnel had arrived; an RDK member "pulled a pistol", and the SBU "immediately shot three HUR members in their legs". Kapustin said he thought the case was "a set-up, a provocation", and said he thought the clash had been caused by "a bungled SBU counterespionage operation that manipulated existing authorised intelligence communication" (as paraphrased by The Times).

Kapustin also said to Ukrainska Pravda that when SBU officers encountered HUR personnel at Kaplunov's apartment on the night of 1 September, there had been a "first confrontation", but that had been resolved until the next morning, when SBU officers allegedly opened fire.

The head of the HUR's Tymur Special Unit said to Radio Free Europe/Radio Liberty that although SBU and HUR officers had reached an agreement at first, SBU officers had allegedly detained unarmed HUR personnel and opened fire.

On 3 September, the HUR published a warning about a "targeted disinformation campaign" against the HUR and its units.

== Reactions ==
Ukrainian president Volodymyr Zelenskyy called the incident "disgraceful" and said that in Ukraine, shooting was only allowed "at Russian occupiers, in defence of Ukraine", never in any other circumstance. He announced that the event would be investigated and would lead to "personnel changes" within the intelligence agencies. He said the deputy heads of both agencies would be dismissed, and that one officer from each agency had been named as suspects. The State Bureau of Investigation and Prosecutor General Ruslan Kravchenko confirmed that notices of suspicion had been served to one HUR and one SBU officer, and that pre-trial investigations into the shooting as well as Kaplunov's disappearance were ongoing.

Presidential communications advisor Dmytro Lytvyn said Zelenskyy had "called out" the heads of the SBU and HUR, and ordered them to inform the public.

Kyrylo Budanov, former HUR chief and current head of the Office of the President of Ukraine, said "no one has the right to abduct servicemen with impunity, open fire in the streets of our cities, or issue or carry out criminal orders."

The Kyiv Independent noted that Ukrainian law requires a person to be charged within 24 hours and brought to court within three days or be released. Olena Shcherban, a lawyer for the Anti-Corruption Action Center, said Kaplunov's detention "appears to be clearly unlawful". Fedir Venislavskyi, a member of the national security and defence committee of the Verkhovna Rada, said that in the committee's view, there were "violations on both sides", and that "any use of firearms—particularly automatic weapons—in a densely populated residential area is inherently unacceptable".

== See also ==
- Denys Kireyev, a Ukrainian intelligence asset who worked for the Ukrainian HUR and was allegedly killed by the SBU
- 2021 Quezon City PNP–PDEA shootout, a shootout between Philippine law enforcement agencies in 2021
