= Timeline of the prelude to the Russian invasion of Ukraine =

Timeline of the Russo-Ukrainian war (2022–present)
- Prelude; (up to 23 February 2022); Initial invasion; (24 February – 7 April 2022); Southeastern front; (8 April – 28 August 2022); 2022 Ukrainian counteroffensives; (29 August – 11 November 2022); Second stalemate; (12 November 2022 – 7 June 2023); 2023 Ukrainian counteroffensive; (8 June 2023 – 31 August 2023); 2023 Ukrainian counteroffensive, cont.; (1 September – 30 November 2023); 2023–2024 winter campaigns; (1 December 2023 – 31 March 2024); 2024 spring and summer campaigns; (1 April – 31 July 2024); 2024 summer–autumn offensives; (1 August – 31 December 2024); 2025 winter–spring offensives; (1 January 2025 – 31 May 2025); 2025 summer offensives; (1 June 2025 – 31 August 2025); 2025 autumn–winter offensives; (1 September 2025 – 31 December 2025); 2026 winter–spring offensives; (1 January 2026 – 31 May 2026); 2026 summer offensives; (1 June 2026 – 31 August 2026); 2026 autumn–winter offensives; (1 September 2026 – present)

This timeline of the prelude to the 2022 Russian invasion of Ukraine covers a period of heightened tensions between Russia and Ukraine from early 2021 until the start of the Russian invasion of Ukraine on 24 February 2022.

== 2021 ==
- 2 September – Russia refuses to extend the mandate of the Organization for Security and Co-operation in Europe mission at the Gukovo and Donetsk border checkpoints from 30 September onward.
- 11 November – The United States reports an unusual movement of Russian troops near the borders of Ukraine. By 20 November 2021, Ukraine had reported a build-up of 92,000 Russian troops.
- 7 December – US President Joe Biden warns President of Russia Vladimir Putin of "strong economic and other measures" if Russia attacks Ukraine.
- 17 December – Russian President Vladimir Putin proposes prohibiting Ukraine from joining NATO, which Ukraine rejects.
- 21 December – During a meeting with the Russian Defense Ministry Board Vladimir Putin explicitly articulated the fear of NATO missiles in Ukraine, which would greatly reduce Russian reaction time.

"If this infrastructure moves further—if US and NATO missile systems appear in Ukraine—then their flight time to Moscow will be reduced to 7–10 minutes, and if hypersonic weapons are deployed—to just 5 minutes."

- 26 December – Russia wants Finland and Sweden not to join NATO, it has also announced that the highest-level military measures would be taken should the two countries enter the alliance.

== 2022 ==
=== January ===
- 5 January – Russia began a slow evacuation of embassy staff and their families from Russia's embassy in Kyiv and its consulate in Lviv.
- 17 January – Russian troops begin arriving in Russia's ally Belarus, ostensibly "for military exercises".
- 19 January – The US gives Ukraine $200 million in security aid.
- 19 January – President Biden states in a press conference: "Russia will be held accountable if it invades. And it depends on what it does."
- 24 January – NATO puts troops on standby.
- 25 January – Russian exercises involving 6,000 troops and 60 jets take place in Russia near Ukraine and Crimea.

=== February ===
- 10 February – Russia and Belarus begin 10 days of military maneuvers.
- 17 February – Fighting escalates in separatist regions of eastern Ukraine.
- 21 February – Vladimir Putin ordered Russian forces to enter the separatist republics in eastern Ukraine. He also announced Russian recognition of the two pro-Russian breakaway regions in eastern Ukraine (the Donetsk People's Republic and the Luhansk People's Republic). This announcement led to the first round of economic sanctions from NATO countries the following day.

Two Ukrainian soldiers and a 51 year old civilian from Novoluhanske were killed in Zaitseve.

In Putin's televised "address concerning the events in Ukraine" before the announcement, he stated his belief that Vladimir Lenin was the "author and architect" of Ukraine and labeled Ukrainians who had taken down Lenin's monuments "ungrateful descendants", saying "This is what they call decommunization. Do you want decommunization? Well, that suits us just fine. But it is unnecessary, as they say, to stop halfway. We are ready to show you what real decommunization means for Ukraine."

== See also ==
- Timeline of the Russian invasion of Ukraine
- Timeline of the war in Donbas (2021)
- Timeline of the war in Donbas (2022)
