= Timeline of the Russo-Ukrainian war (29 August – 11 November 2022) =

Timeline of the Russo-Ukrainian war (2022–present)
- Prelude; (up to 23 February 2022); Initial invasion; (24 February – 7 April 2022); Southeastern front; (8 April – 28 August 2022); 2022 Ukrainian counteroffensives; (29 August – 11 November 2022); Second stalemate; (12 November 2022 – 7 June 2023); 2023 Ukrainian counteroffensive; (8 June 2023 – 31 August 2023); 2023 Ukrainian counteroffensive, cont.; (1 September – 30 November 2023); 2023–2024 winter campaigns; (1 December 2023 – 31 March 2024); 2024 spring and summer campaigns; (1 April – 31 July 2024); 2024 summer–autumn offensives; (1 August – 31 December 2024); 2025 winter–spring offensives; (1 January 2025 – 31 May 2025); 2025 summer offensives; (1 June 2025 – 31 August 2025); 2025 autumn–winter offensives; (1 September 2025 – 31 December 2025); 2026 winter–spring offensives; (1 January 2026 – 31 May 2026); 2026 summer offensives; (1 June 2026 – 31 August 2026); 2026 autumn–winter offensives; (1 September 2026 – present)

This timeline of the Russo-Ukrainian war covers the period from 29 August 2022, when Ukraine's Kherson counteroffensive started, to 11 November 2022 when Ukrainian troops retook Kherson. In between, Ukraine launched a successful counteroffensive in Kharkiv Oblast. Starting in October, Russia began a campaign of massive strikes against Ukrainian infrastructure.

== August 2022 ==
=== 29 August ===
Ukraine launched a counteroffensive in the south. The Ukrainian government said that its military had "breached Russia's first line of defense near Kherson", while the Ukrainian military also claimed to have struck a Russian military base in Kherson Oblast, though this claim was not verified. Russian forces claimed that Ukrainian forces have suffered "heavy losses". Ukraine also claimed that Russian paratroopers have fled the battlefield.

=== 30 August ===
Ukraine claimed to have used decoy HIMARS units made out of wood, which could have explained Russian claims of having destroyed multiple HIMARS systems. Ukrainian officials claimed to have decoyed 10 Russian 3M-54 Kalibr cruise missiles alone. One US diplomat noted that Russian sources claimed to have destroyed more HIMARS than the US has sent. Another Pentagon official confirmed no HIMARS had been destroyed yet.

Images from Maxar Technologies showed holes in the roof of the Zaporizhzhia Nuclear Power Plant. IAEA chief Rafael Grossi confirmed that the support and assistance mission was "now on its way".

=== 31 August ===
Russia pulled its fighter jets out of Crimea and increased its surface-to-air missiles to defend against future shelling.

Russia stopped gas supplies to Germany via Nord Stream 1 for three days to perform repairs.

According to the UK MoD, Ukrainian forces pushed the Russian "front line back some distance in places", due to Ukraine "exploiting relatively thinly held Russian defenses".

Ukraine released footage of a MiG-29 firing an AGM-88 HARM, which had to be somehow integrated into the MiG-29's analogue displays.

== September 2022 ==
=== 1 September ===
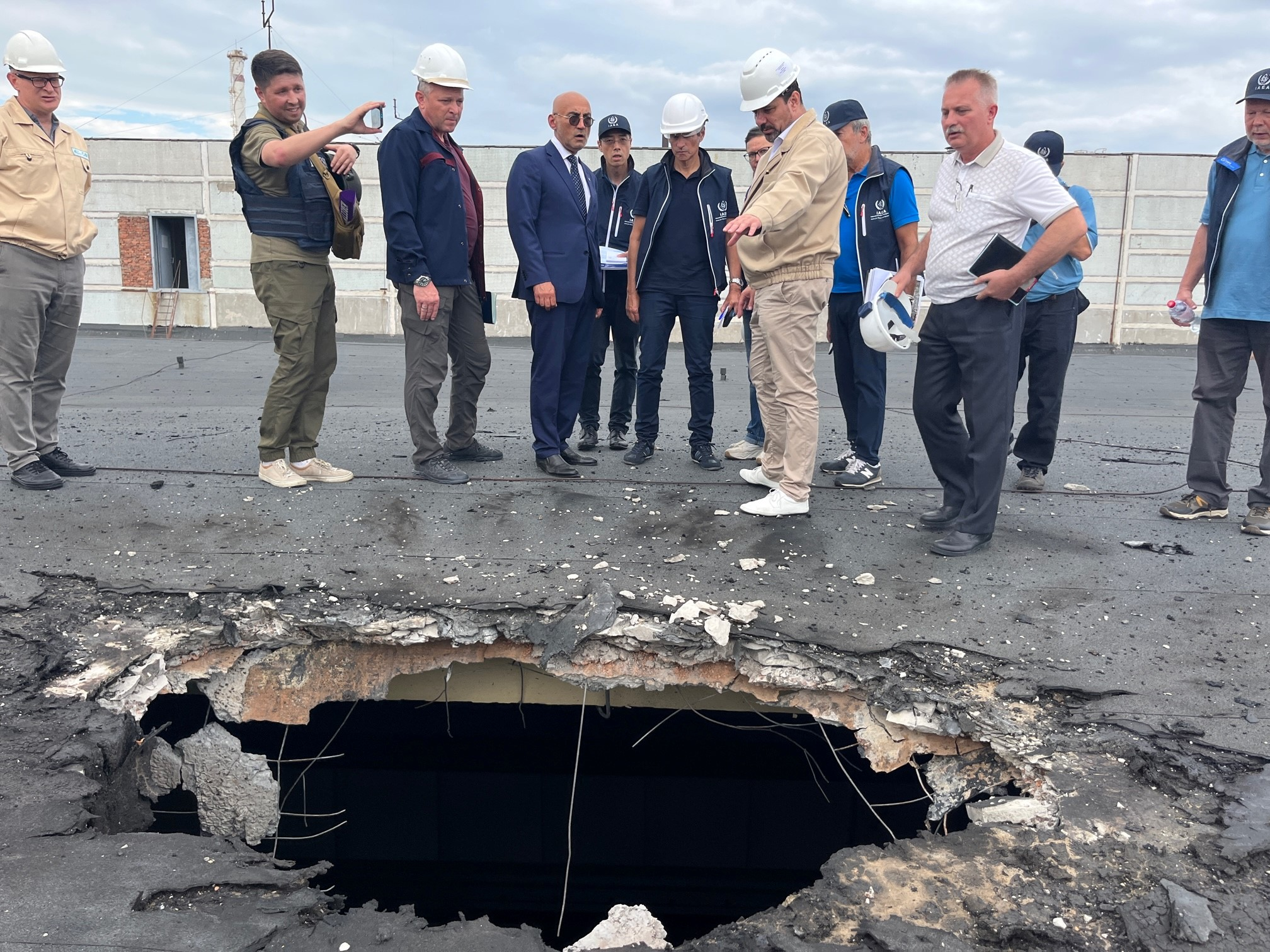
IAEA inspectors at the Zaporizhzhia Nuclear Power Plant

IAEA inspectors arrived at the Zaporizhzhia Nuclear Power Plant.

Ravil Maganov, the chairman of Lukoil, died in disputed circumstances. According to Interfax, he "fell out of a window of the Central Clinical Hospital" and "died from his injuries". Lukoil was one of the few Russian companies to oppose the war in Ukraine, calling for an "immediate" end to the war. Maganov's death is the latest mysterious death of current or former Russian businessmen since the war began.

=== 2 September ===
Norwegian state-owned oil company Equinor exited the last of their joint ventures in Russia following the February invasion by withdrawing from the joint venture with Lukoil and exiting the Kharyaga project.

Ukraine arrested a woman in Dnipropetrovsk Oblast who was accused of sending the details of her husband's unit and other military information to Russian forces which was then used to the advantage of Russian military action.

Russian support for the war in Ukraine remained stable despite it dragging on for six months. The greatest disagreement was on whether to continue the war or proceed to negotiations.

Ukraine was searching the UK for foundries to make 155 mm ammunition due to Western stockpiles running low. BAE systems can increase production however Ukrainian officials are looking for other manufacturers. The US had sent "806,000" of these rounds to Ukraine and replacing them could take as long as "18 months".

=== 3 September ===
Gazprom maintained its shutdown of Nord Stream 1 without providing a date for restarting the flow of gas. Gazprom cited international sanctions as the reason that it cannot fix the "malfunction" in the pipe, which is claimed to be a leak. The European Union called it an economic weapon.

According to the UK MoD, since 29 August Ukrainian forces had gained the element of surprise due to mistakes made by Russian commanders and logistical problems Russian forces face. There were three main thrusts by Ukrainian forces into Kherson Oblast. Ukraine also destroyed pontoon bridges used by Russian forces.

=== 4 September ===
The Zaporizhzhia Nuclear Power Plant was cut from its main power line, with only a reserve line operational, which was supplying power to the grid. Only one of the six reactors remained operational. Russia blamed this on an alleged Ukrainian attempt to retake the plant.

After not being used for several months Ukraine resumed its use of Bayraktar TB2 drones. Ukraine started putting footage from these online again after no new footage in the last two months. This was credited to the use of HARM missiles and their impact on Russian air defences.

=== 6 September ===
Artem Bardin, a Russian-installed official in Berdyansk, was seriously injured in a bomb attack.

Sky News reported that Russia bought rockets from North Korea to assist with the 2022 Russian invasion of Ukraine.

=== 7 September ===
The US was looking to double its production of 155 mm shells due to a need to replenish US stocks as well as supply Ukrainian needs. The Pentagon said it was aiming to increase the number of HIMARS built each month to 12.

=== 9 September ===
Ukrainian forces retook parts of Kharkiv Oblast.

=== 10 September ===
As part of a major counteroffensive, Ukrainian forces recaptured Kupiansk and Izium; according to the UK Ministry of Defence, Russian defences in Kharkiv Oblast were "likely taken by surprise". By late afternoon, Ukrainian troops were reported to have reached Lysychansk in Luhansk Oblast. The Russian Ministry of Defence spokesperson Igor Konashenkov responded to these developments by claiming that Russian forces in the Balakliya and Izyum area would "regroup" in the Donetsk area "in order to achieve the stated goals of the special military operation to liberate Donbas". Ukrainian President Zelenskyy said that Ukraine has recaptured 2,000 square kilometres (770 sq mi) since the start of the counteroffensive.

=== 11 September ===
The Russian Ministry of Defense published a map which confirmed that Russian forces in Kharkiv Oblast had retreated to the east bank of the Oskil river. The settlements of Kozachya Lopan, Vovchansk and Lyptsi were confirmed as being under control of Ukrainian forces. By late afternoon, the Russian Ministry of Defense announced the formal withdrawal of Russian forces from nearly all of Kharkiv Oblast stating that an "operation to curtail and transfer troops" was underway.

Chechen leader Ramzan Kadyrov questioned Russian leadership of the war, writing on Telegram: "They have made mistakes and I think they will draw the necessary conclusions. If they don't make changes in the strategy of conducting the special military operation in the next day or two, I will be forced to contact the leadership of the Defense Ministry and the leadership of the country to explain the real situation on the ground."

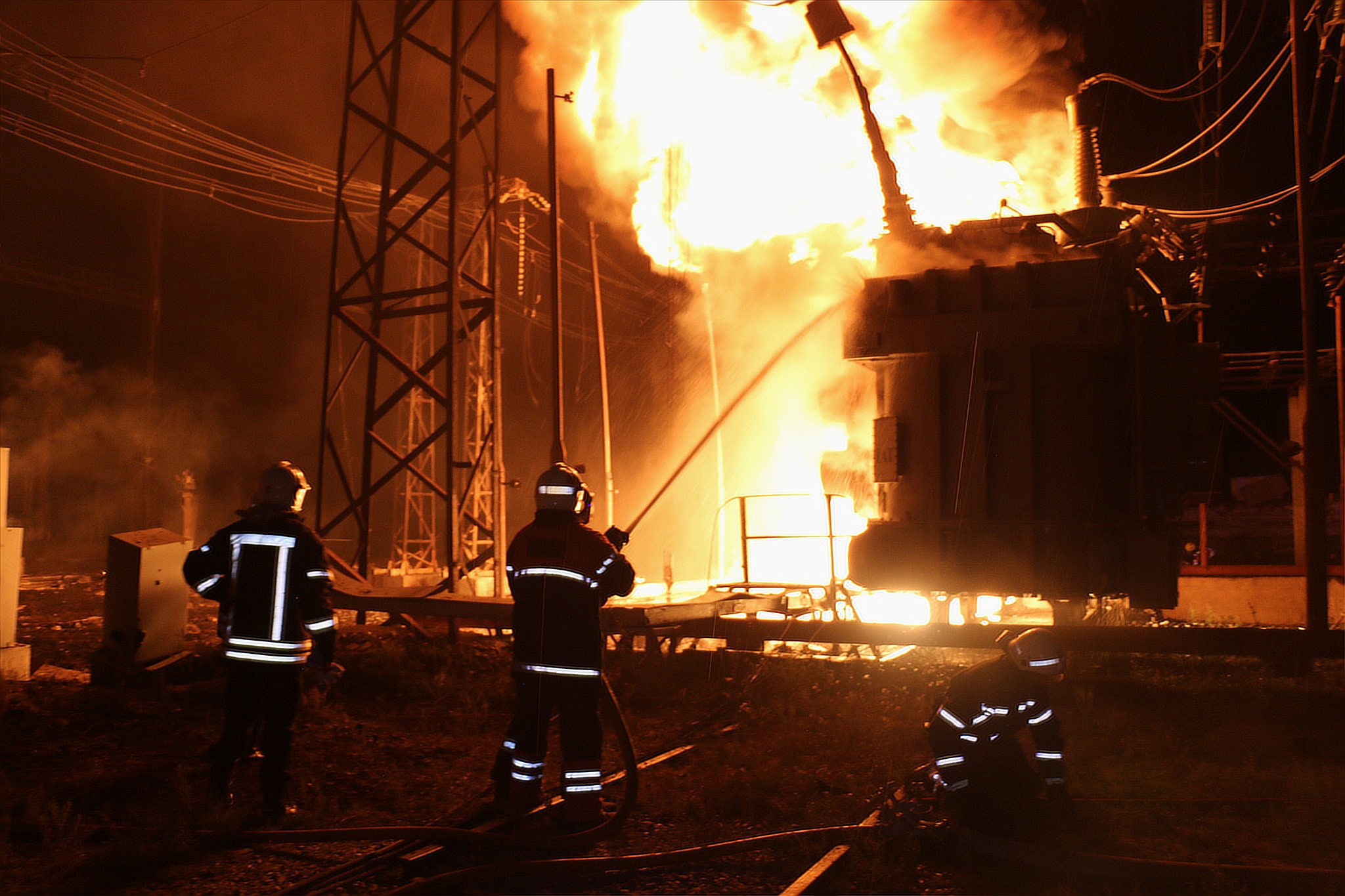
Kharkiv power plant after missile strike

Following the 2022 Ukrainian Kharkiv counteroffensive, Russia launched missile strikes with Kalibr cruise missiles on critical infrastructure objects, including Kharkiv TEC-5, causing a total blackout and water shutdown in northeastern Ukraine and Kharkiv and Donetsk Oblasts.

=== 12 September ===
Ukraine claimed it had reached the Russia–Ukraine border. Zelenskyy said that Ukrainian forces had retaken a total of 6,000 square kilometres (2,300 sq mi) from Russia, in both the south and the east; the BBC could not verify the claims.

Thirty-five Russian municipal deputies signed a petition calling for President Vladimir Putin to resign.

=== 13 September ===
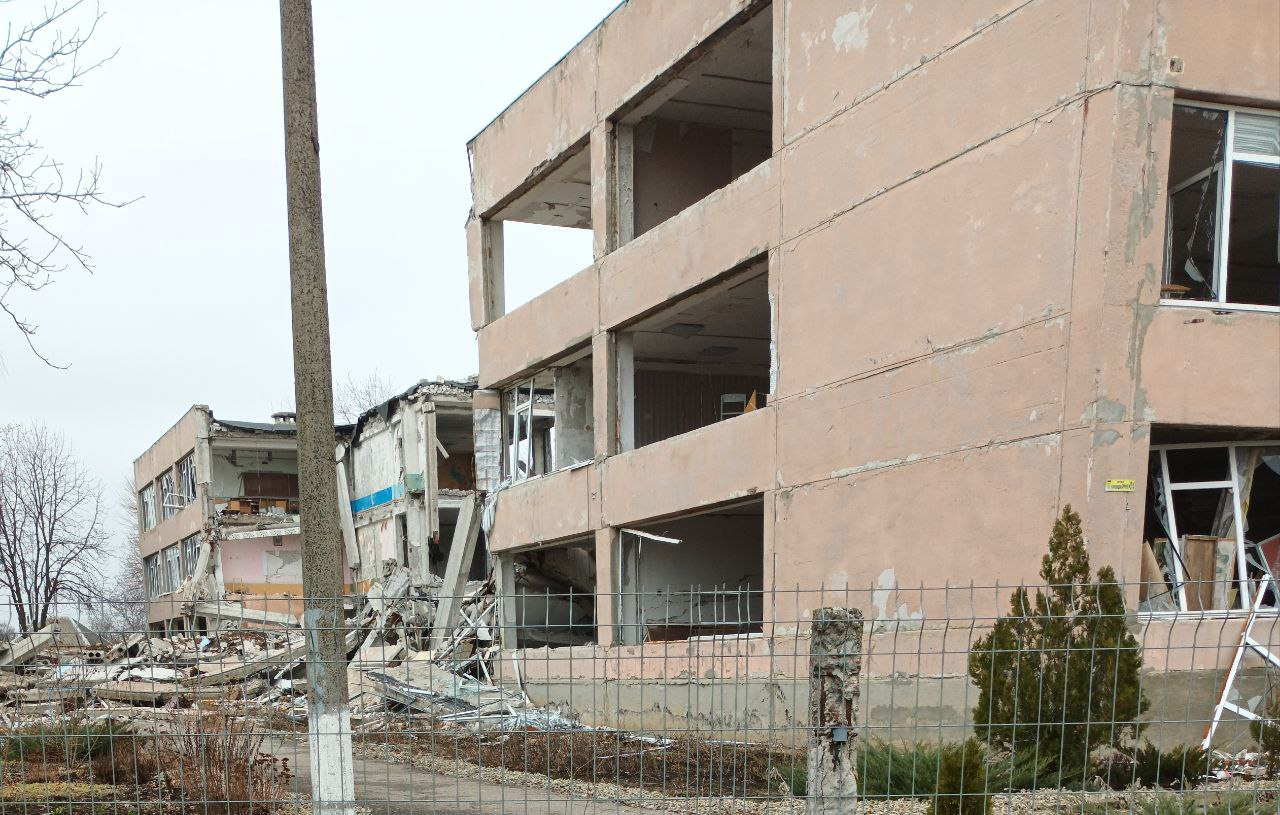
School in Lozova (Kharkiv region) after missile strike on 13 September

On the Kherson front, it was reported that Russian forces had withdrawn from Kiselyovka, a settlement 15 km from Kherson. The Ukrainian armed forces announced that the frontline in Kherson Oblast had advanced by 12 km and that 500 square kilometres (190 sq mi) including 13 settlements had been recovered.

Ukrainian Governor of Luhansk Oblast, Serhiy Haidai, stated that Russian forces had left Kreminna three days ago and that the Ukrainian flag had been raised by local residents but Ukrainian forces had not yet entered the town. He also said that Russian forces had fled Starobilsk, adding that the city was "practically empty".

=== 14 September ===
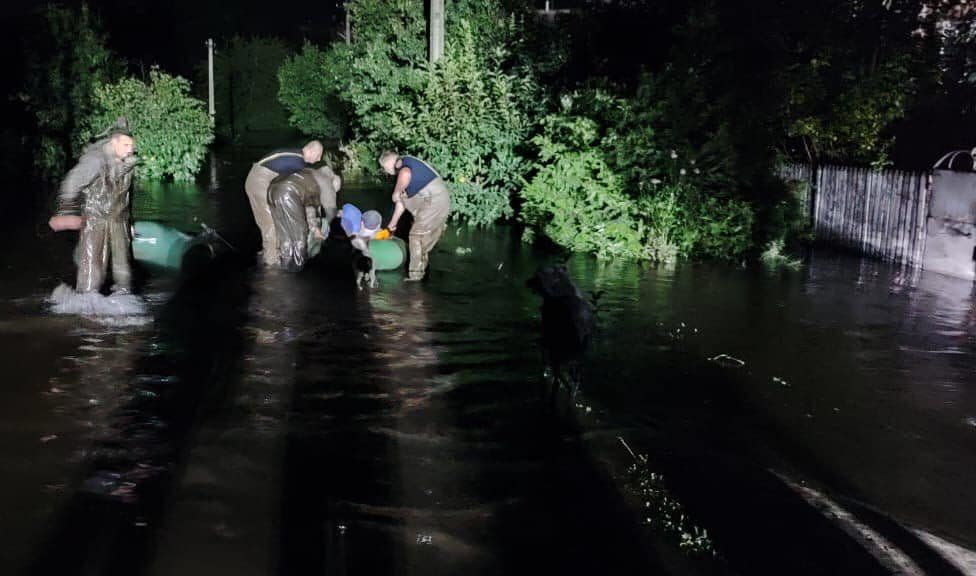
Flood after rocket strikes on the dam of Karachunivske Reservoir (Dnipropetrovsk Oblast)

After a phone call with Vladimir Putin, German Chancellor Olaf Scholz told journalists that he had not perceived a growing understanding by Russia that beginning this war had been a mistake, and that he had not seen signs of a prospective change in attitudes either. UN Secretary-General António Guterres also said that prospects for a peace negotiation were "minimal".

Russian forces launched eight cruise missiles at the dam of the Karachunivske reservoir causing extensive flooding in Kryvyi Rih and a 2.5 metres (8 ft) increase of water level in the Inhulets River.

=== 15 September ===
The United States announced a $600 million aid package for Ukraine, including additional HIMARS ammunition, "tens of thousands" of 105 mm artillery rounds, one thousand 155 mm rounds, counter-drone systems, winter gear, and night vision devices.

=== 16 September ===
BM-21 missiles and heavy artillery shelled Nikopol, injuring 1 and damaging 11 high-rise buildings, a kindergarten, a school, gas furnaces, and power lines.

=== 17 September ===
Two people were killed after a rocket attack by Russian forces on residential buildings in the town of Chuhuiv.

=== 18 September ===
Catherine, Princess of Wales met Olena Zelenska, the first lady of Ukraine, at Buckingham Palace.

=== 19 September ===
Rocket strike near the South Ukraine Nuclear Power Plant

The Ukrainian Ground Forces recaptured the village of Bilohorivka in Luhansk Oblast during their advance on Lysychansk.

A Russian missile hit the outskirts of the South Ukraine Nuclear Power Plant, damaging buildings and a neighboring hydroelectric power station. Nuclear reactors were not damaged.

=== 20 September ===
The Russian State Duma introduced laws prohibiting voluntary surrender and looting, with aggravating circumstances including committing the crime "during mobilization or martial law". Under those circumstances, refusing to obey a superior's order or participate in military action was also made illegal. Penalties for not reporting for military duty, or leaving it without permission, were increased.

The Russian-appointed officials of the self-proclaimed Donetsk and Luhansk People's Republics announced referendums to approve their annexation by Russia on 23–27 September. Similar referendums were announced by the occupying Russian officials in Kherson and Zaporizhzhia.

The Council of the EU approved 5 billion euros of macro-financial assistance for Ukraine.

=== 21 September ===
After a delay in broadcasting Vladimir Putin announces a partial mobilization in his address on the morning of 21 September.

In a prerecorded speech, Putin officially announced partial mobilization to begin immediately. Although Putin's address stated only reservists will be called up, with a focus on reservists with military experience, the official decree allowed for any citizen to be conscripted with exceptions for only age, sickness, and imprisonment status; it was reported that anti-war protesters who had been arrested were being conscripted. Furthermore, militants in the Luhansk and Donetsk People's Republics were to be considered soldiers of the Russian Federation going forward, and the LPR and DPR military units will be reordered according to Russian standards. Defence minister Sergei Shoigu said that 300,000 reservists will be mobilized. Putin also raised the threat of a nuclear response, saying "Russia will use all the instruments at its disposal to counter a threat against its territorial integrity—this is not a bluff".

The Ministry of Foreign Affairs of Saudi Arabia reported that Russia released ten foreign prisoners of war after mediation by Prince Mohammed bin Salman. According to Robert Jenrick, the junior health minister of Britain, Aiden Aslin is among the prisoners released. Viktor Medvedchuk was reportedly freed as part of the deal.

A record 215 Ukrainian soldiers, including fighters who led the defence of the Azovstal steelworks in Mariupol, were released in a prisoner exchange with Russia after mediation by Turkish President Recep Tayyip Erdoğan. Zelenskyy announced that, as part of the agreement, five of the freed captives would remain in Turkey in secure but comfortable conditions until the war is over.

=== 23 September ===
Russian-occupied regions held referendums to join Russia. US President Joe Biden and German Chancellor Olaf Scholz referred to them as shams.

In Izium, Kharkiv Oblast, the exhumation of a mass grave was completed. A total of 436 bodies were recovered, of which thirty had traces of torture.

The Armed Forces of Ukraine reestablished control over the settlement of Yatskivka in Donetsk Oblast, east of the Oskil river.

=== 26 September ===
The United Kingdom introduced new sanctions against Russia due to Russia's holding of pseudo-referendums in occupied Ukrainian territories. The sanctions list included 92 individuals and legal entities, including 33 Russian officials sent to the occupied territories of Ukraine as well as 55 top managers of Russian state-owned companies.

=== 27 September ===
More than 1600 Russian propaganda accounts were taken down by Facebook.

The Armed Forces of Ukraine retook the village of Kupiansk-Vuzlovyi in Kharkiv Oblast. As of 27 September, up to 6% of the oblast's territory remained under occupation.

The results of the referendums in the Russian-occupied territories were announced, all of which were in favor of annexation into Russia, with Donetsk Oblast 99.23% in favour, Luhansk Oblast 98.42% in favour, Kherson Oblast 87.05%, and Zaporizhzhia Oblast at 93.11%. There were planned votes in the Mykolaiv and Kharkiv oblasts that never materialized, mainly owing to limited control of territory. As a side effect of these referendums, Russia now claimed that the "very existence of the state is at risk", since much of the war was happening on what it now illegally considered Russian territory, and could be used as justification of using nuclear weapons.

Over 194,000 Russian citizens, primarily fighting age men and their families, left Russia in what has been called a "mass exodus" after the announcement of a draft of 300,000 citizens to fight in the war. Many have gone to Kazakhstan, Serbia, Georgia, and Finland.

=== 28 September ===
NATO Secretary-General Jens Stoltenberg attributed the Nord Stream pipeline leaks to acts of sabotage. The next day, the Swedish Coast Guard found a fourth leak on Nord Stream 2.

Ukrainian police recorded at least 582 war crimes committed by Russia in the formerly occupied territories of Kharkiv Oblast.

The United States announced a $1.1 billion aid package to Ukraine, including:

- 18 High Mobility Artillery Rocket Systems (HIMARS) and ammunition
- 150 Armored High Mobility Multipurpose Wheeled Vehicles (Humvee)
- 150 tactical vehicles to tow weapons
- 40 trucks and 80 trailers
- 2 radars for unmanned aerial systems
- 20 multi-mission radars

=== 29 September ===
Finland announced the closure of its borders to Russian citizens at midnight. The Finnish Government deemed that the Russian mobilization and the rapidly increasing volume of tourists arriving in and transiting via the country endanger Finland's international position and relations.

Ukraine fully captured Kupiansk. Russian soldiers held positions on the eastern beach of the river Oskil that flows through the city. Exchange of fire happened until the positions had been taken.

Putin signed decrees recognizing the sovereignty and independence of Kherson and Zaporizhzhia Oblasts.

=== 30 September ===
At least thirty civilians died and dozens more were injured in Zaporizhzhia when a Russian missile hit a humanitarian convoy.

Putin held a speech in a so-called "signing ceremony" intended to mark the Russian annexation of Southeastern Ukraine. In the speech, Putin announced claims on Donetsk, Luhansk, Kherson and Zaporizhzhia Oblasts, saying they were now "four new regions" of the Russian Federation. In response, Zelenskyy asked NATO to give Ukraine membership into the military alliance.

== October 2022 ==
=== 1 October ===
Ukrainian troops raised the Ukrainian flag at an entrance to the city of Lyman. Russia confirmed that it had lost control of Lyman later that afternoon.

President Volodymyr Zelenskyy announced that Ukrainian soldiers retook Yampil, a town near Lyman.

Kyiv announced the deaths of 24 citizens, 13 of whom were children, in a Russian strike in Kharkiv Oblast.

Chechen leader Ramzan Kadyrov called on Putin to take "more drastic measures", including martial law and the use of low-yield nuclear weapons. This was in response to the Russian withdrawal from Lyman where he placed blame on communication among leadership and supply issues.

=== 2 October ===
A Ukrainian armoured offensive burst through Russian lines in the south capturing multiple villages along the Dnipro river. This was the biggest Ukrainian advance in the south since the war began.

=== 3 October ===
It was reported that Russian forces had fled from Nyzhe Zolone, Pidlyman, Nyznya Zhuravka, Borova and Shyikivka in Kharkiv Oblast and that Ukrainian authorities had regained control of those settlements, effectively ending the Russian occupation of Kharkiv Oblast.

=== 4 October ===
According to Russian Defence Minister Sergei Shoigu, more than 200,000 people had been called up for military service since Russia announced a "partial mobilization".

The US announced a new package of $625 million to Ukraine. They also sent 4 more HIMARS rocket artillery systems.

Ukrainian forces regained control of numerous settlements north of the Dnipro River in Kherson Oblast including Davydiv Brid, Lyubymivka, Khreshchenivka, Zolota Balka, Bilyaivka, Ukrainka and Velyka Oleksandrivka.

=== 5 October ===
The pro-Russian deputy head of Kherson Oblast, Kirill Stremousov, stated that Russian forces were regrouping to strike back at Ukrainian troops; he added that the Ukrainian advance had been "halted" and therefore it was "not possible" for the Ukrainian Army to break through to Kherson city. The Russians were seemingly retreating to fortified positions around Nova Kakhovka. Russian officers (but not troops) were reported as withdrawing from Snihurivka.

=== 6 October ===
According to CNN, unidentified "US intelligence officials" believed that the car bombing of Darya Dugina may have been authorized "by elements within the Ukrainian government".

Ukrainian authorities found two mass graves in liberated Lyman.

Russian forces launched seven rockets into apartment buildings in Zaporizhzhia, killing at least three people and wounding twelve others. The casualties rose to 17 (including one child) by 9 October.

A report by the Pentagon that was later obtained by media outlets in July 2023 said that organized crime groups, some of which were linked to Russia, and arms traffickers had stolen some weapons and equipment provided by the West to Ukraine, but said attempts to sell or abscond with the stolen material were thwarted by Ukrainian intelligence services.

=== 7 October ===
Ukrainian officials said they shot down 20 drones in the last 24 hours.

=== 8 October ===
An explosion on the Crimean Bridge caused a section to burn and partially collapse resulting in the death of at least 3 people.

=== 9 October ===
Russia launched six missiles at an apartment block in Zaporizhzhia, resulting in the deaths of 13 people and injuring more than 89 others.

=== 10 October ===
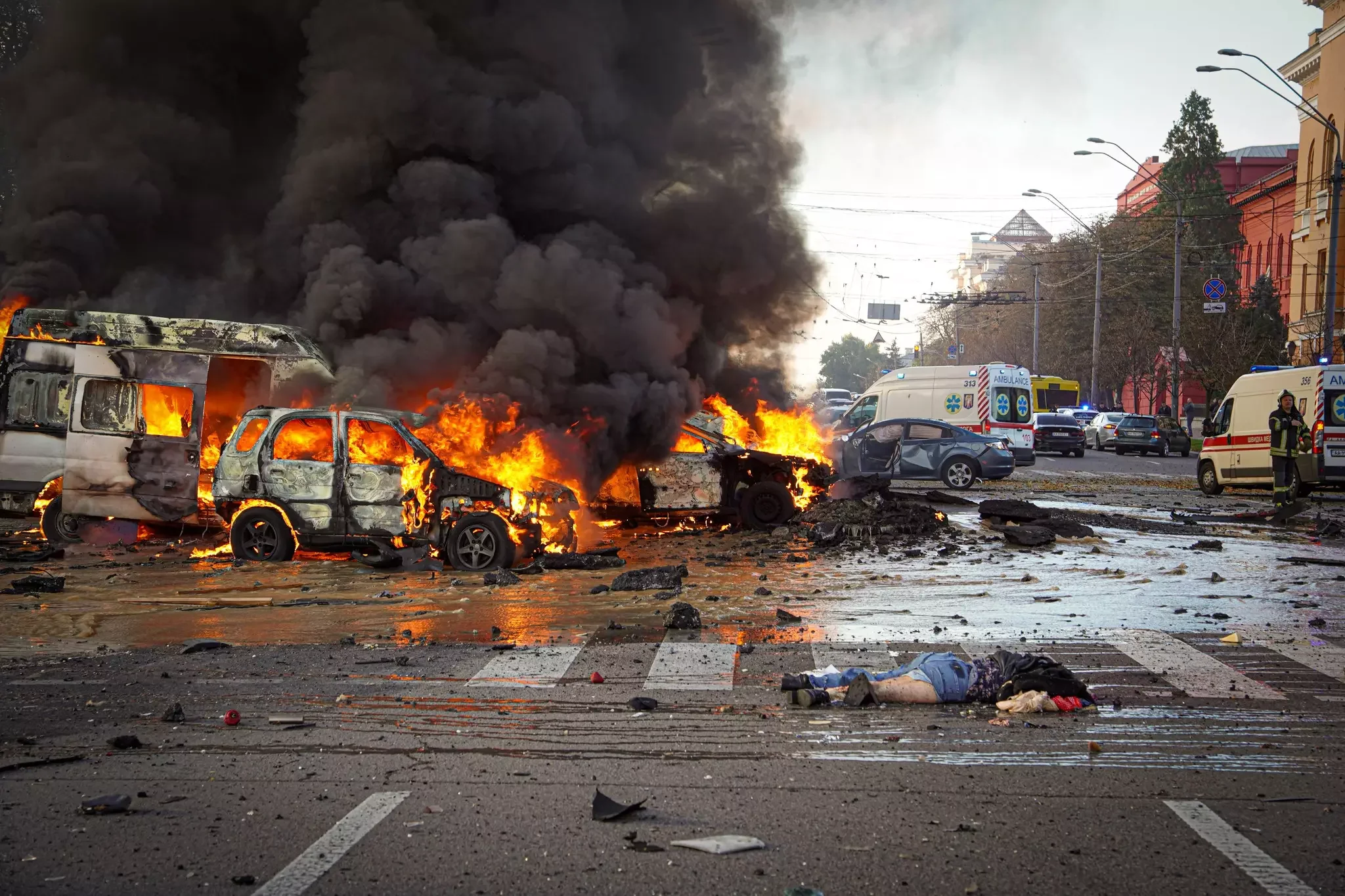
Kyiv after the missile strikes

Russia launched a massive missile strike across the entire territory of Ukraine, including the capital, Kyiv, killing at least 23 civilians and injuring more than 100. Putin]said that Russia carried out the attack as revenge for the attack on the Crimean Bridge. The German Embassy in Kyiv was damaged due to the strikes. No officials were present at the embassy since it has been vacant since the war began.

Alexander Lukashenko announced Belarus would form a joint regional group of forces with Russia, possibly also joining the war further on. He said, "If they touch one metre of our territory then the Crimean Bridge will seem to them like a walk in the park."

=== 12 October ===
United Nations General Assembly resolution, 12 October 2022

The United Nations General Assembly passed Resolution ES-11/4 by a large majority, calling on countries not to recognise the four regions of Ukraine which Russia has claimed, following so-called referendums held late last month, and demanding that Moscow reverse course on its "attempted illegal annexation". 143 member states voted in favor and 35 abstained, notably China and India. Only Belarus, North Korea, Nicaragua, Russia and Syria voted against the resolution.

=== 13 October ===
Russian forces launched eight missiles at Mykolaiv, hitting a five-story residential building. A 11-year-old boy was pulled out of the rubble alive but later died in hospital.

A Ukrainian MiG-29 became the first manned aircraft to be downed by a drone during combat. The pilot claimed to have destroyed a Shahed-136 drone with his cannon, with the resulting blast downing the aircraft and hospitalising the pilot.

=== 15 October ===
Eleven people were killed and 15 others injured after two shooters opened fire on a group of volunteers at a Russian military training ground in Soloti, Belgorod Oblast, near the border with Ukraine. The two attackers were killed during the incident.

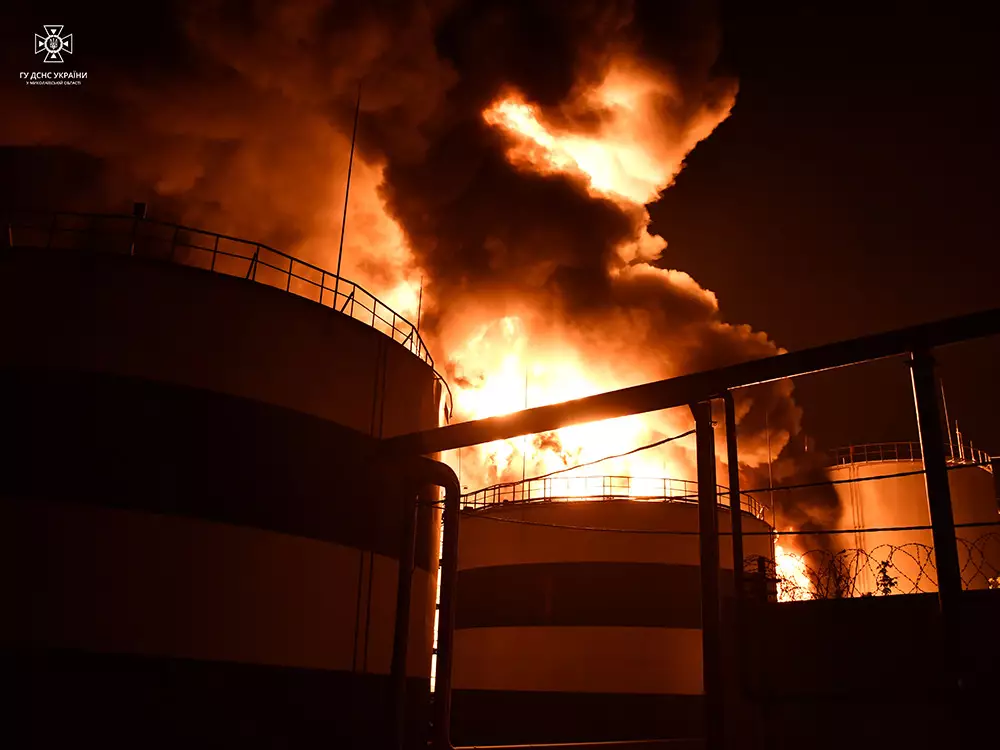
Tanks with sunflower oil in Mykolaiv attacked on 16 October

=== 16 October ===
Russian kamikaze drones stroke two tanks with sunflower oil for export (about 7.5 thousand tons each) in Mykolaiv. The tanks caught fire and the oil flowed through the streets.

=== 17 October ===
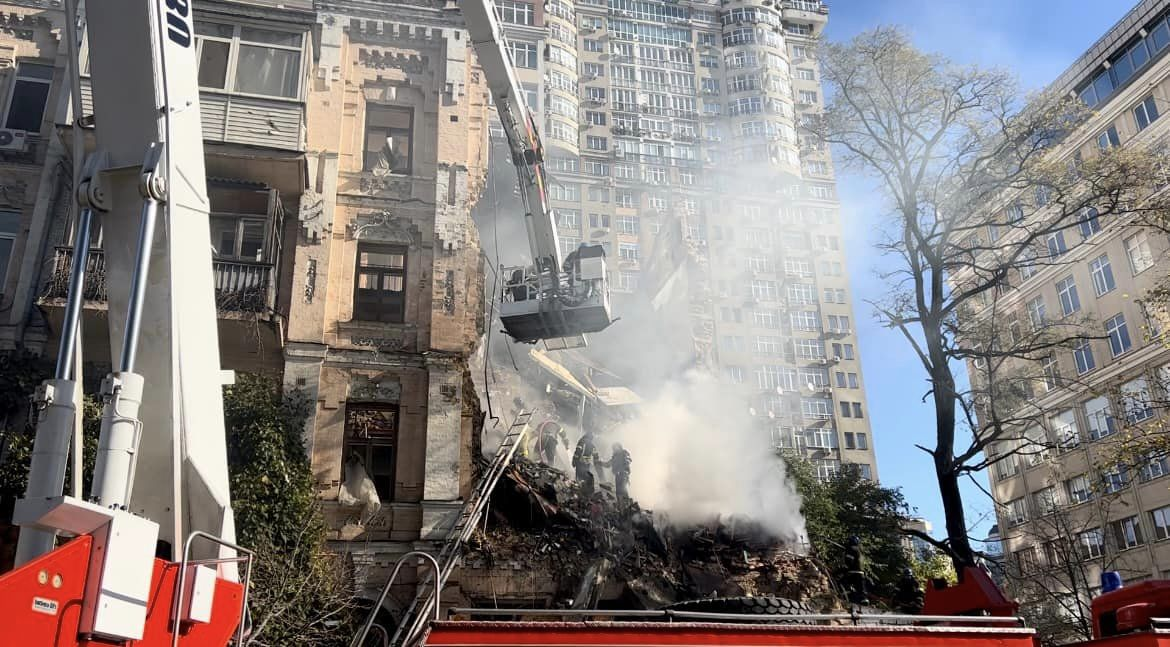
A destroyed house in Kyiv

Ukrainian officials claimed to have found wreckage of multiple HESA Shahed 136 kamikaze drones which struck Kyiv, causing three to four explosions and killing at least 4 people, according to the city's mayor, Vitali Klitschko. Another four were killed in Sumy. This came after Russian President Vladimir Putin said there was no need for further "large-scale" strikes on Ukraine. According to a Reuters journalist, some drones bore the inscription "For Belgorod". In Mykolaiv the mayor, Oleksandr Senkevych, said sunflower oil tanks caught fire after a drone attack. The Ukrainian Air Force said it intercepted 37 drones.

A Russian Sukhoi Su-34 fighter-bomber crashed into a residential building in the Russian city of Yeysk, causing multiple apartments to catch fire. The pilots managed to eject safely, according to Russian agencies; 13 people were killed and 19 injured in the crash.

=== 18 October ===
According to Ukrainian officials, Russian forces struck "critical infrastructure" north of Kyiv and in Zhytomyr, leading to water and power cuts in Zhytomyr. In Kyiv, "several explosions" were heard, while in Mykolaiv a person was said to have been killed by a missile strike. Dnipro was also attacked. President Zelenskyy claimed that over the last 8 days, since 10 October, a third of Ukrainian power stations have been destroyed. He wrote on Twitter: "no space left for negotiations with Russian President Vladimir Putin's regime." In total, over the last 10 days, Ukrainian national emergency services claim that 70 people were killed, 290 were wounded and 1,162 villages and towns remain without power due to attacks on electrical infrastructure.

In a prisoner swap between Ukraine and Russia, 108 women were freed, including 97 service personnel and 37 Azovstal evacuees.

Ukraine recognised the Chechen Republic of Ichkeria as "Territory temporarily occupied by Russia".

=== 19 October ===
Russian General Sergey Surovikin said that civilians were being relocated from Kherson in preparation for a Ukrainian offensive on the city, with a possible target of between 50 and 60 thousand civilians. Ukraine called on residents to ignore the Russian move.

Putin declared martial law in the annexed Donetsk, Luhansk, Kherson, and Zaporizhzhia Oblasts. Russia also introduced an "intermediate response level" in Crimea and Sevastopol, and in regions bordering Ukraine: Krasnodar Krai and the Belgorod, Bryansk, Voronezh, Kursk, and Rostov Oblasts.

=== 22 October ===
Power outages were reported across Ukraine as Russian airstrikes across the country struck critical infrastructure and energy facilities.

=== 23 October ===
The US dismissed Russian fears of Ukraine using a dirty bomb. Two weeks later, UN nuclear inspectors announced they had found no evidence of a dirty bomb in Ukraine.

=== 24 October ===
Ukraine accused Russia of delaying 165 cargo ships heading from Turkey to Ukraine.

=== 26 October ===
Russia started recruiting members of the Afghan National Army Commando Corps, soldiers trained by the US Navy SEALs and British Armed Forces.

A Russian missile strike on Dnipro killed two people, including a pregnant woman.

Russian forces deported about 70,000 Ukrainian civilians from the right bank of the Dnieper river, some of them to southern Russia.

=== 27 October ===
Vladimir Putin was said to have monitored drills of Russia's strategic nuclear forces.

Russian-backed authorities in Zaporizhzhia Oblast ordered phone checks on residents following the implementation of military censorship.

Kyiv implemented stricter blackouts due to the drone strikes.

=== 28 October ===
South Korea denied they were sending weapons to Ukraine after Putin's remarks that such a move "would destroy relations".

The European Union appointed Polish General Piotr Trytek to lead its training mission for Ukrainian troops.

=== 29 October ===
The Russian-occupied Sevastopol Naval Base was attacked by unmanned surface vehicles and drones. Nine UAVs and seven USVs were destroyed according to Russian officials. Russia accused Britain of being involved in the preparation of the attacks. The UK Ministry of Defence responded, saying Russia was "peddling lies on an epic scale". After the attack, Russia suspended its participation in the Black Sea Grain Initiative but resumed its participation four days later. One of the ships which appeared to be damaged in videos was the Admiral Makarov, the new flagship of Russia's Black Sea Fleet following the sinking of the Moskva.

=== 31 October ===
The Russian Armed Forces launched more than 50 missiles at energy infrastructure in Kyiv, and other regions such as Kharkiv, Zaporizhzhia, Cherkasy and Kirovohrad. 13 people were injured by the strikes. Up to 18 facilities were hit, according to Prime Minister Denys Shmyhal. 40% of Kyiv residents were left without water and 270,000 apartments were left without electricity. One missile shot down by Ukraine fell in the Moldovan village of Naslavcea, causing no casualties but shattering windows in some houses. Moldova told an unnamed Russian embassy employee to leave the country, making him a persona non grata.

== November 2022 ==
=== 1 November ===
Russia announced the completion of its partial mobilization.

=== 3 November ===
The US said that North Korea was covertly shipping artillery to Russia.

In a prisoner swap, 107 Ukrainian servicemen were returned to Ukraine.

The Zaporizhzhia nuclear power plant was running on backup generators due to Russian shelling.

=== 4 November ===
Ukrainian Defence Minister Oleksii Reznikov announced that Ukroboronprom will start manufacturing 152 and 122mm shells for its Soviet-era weapons.

=== 5 November ===
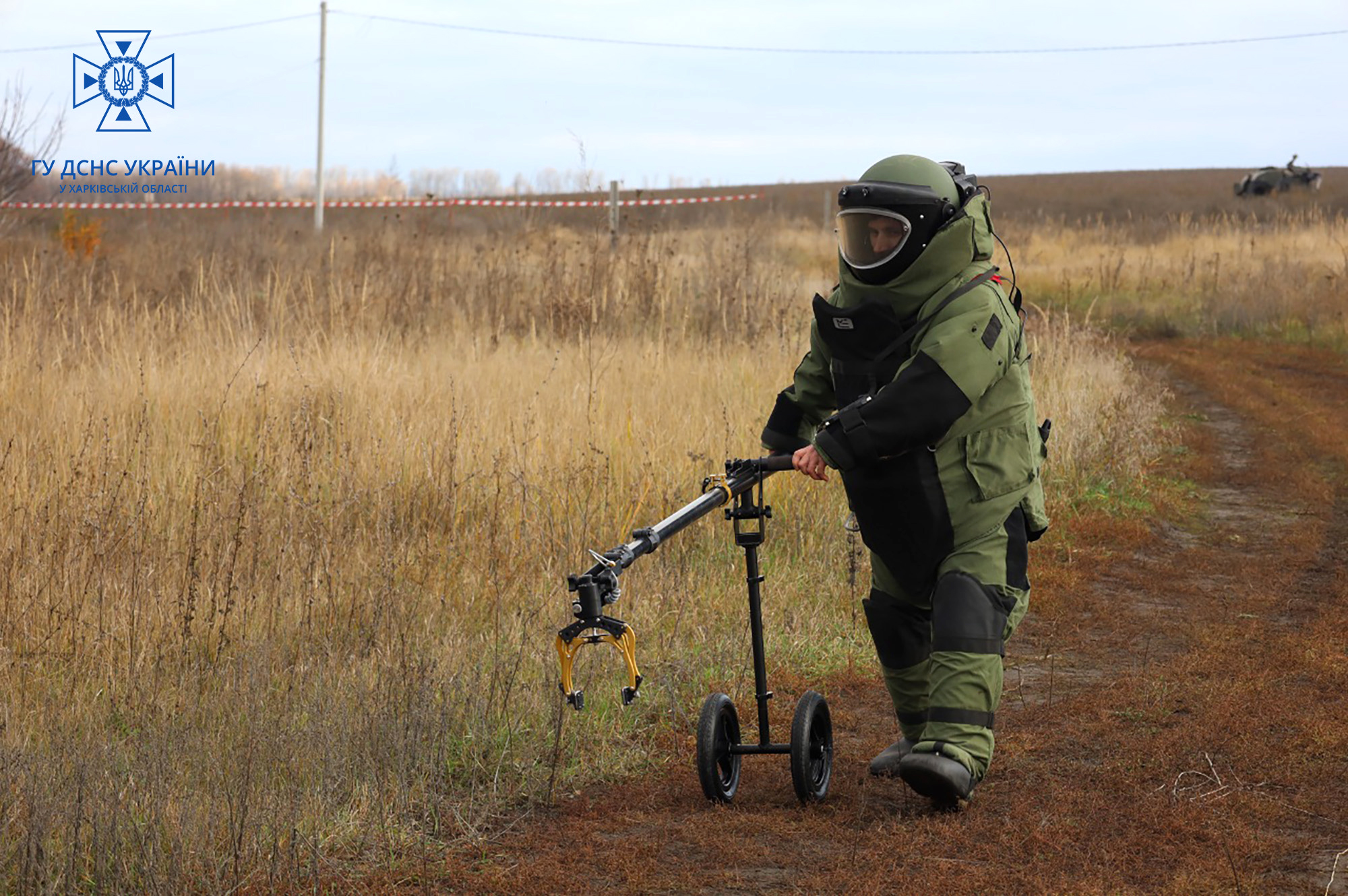
Demining in Kharkiv Oblast

President Putin signed a decree that allows people convicted of serious crimes to be mobilised into the Russian army. Exempted from this decree were people convicted of sex crimes involving minors and crimes against the state such as treason, spying or terrorism—such people still cannot be mobilised. This could allow "hundreds of thousands" of people to be mobilised.

=== 9 November ===
Ukrainian forces entered Snihurivka. Russian forces announced their withdrawal from Kherson and their retreat to the east bank of the Dnipro.

The pro-Russian deputy head of Kherson Oblast, Kirill Stremousov, died in a car crash near Henichesk.

=== 10 November ===
Fields in Kharkiv Oblast strewn with craters

Several United States officials announced a $400 million military aid package to Ukraine, including ammunition for the High Mobility Artillery Rocket System (HIMARS), mortars and missiles for the Hawk surface-to-air anti-aircraft system, and, for the first time, Avenger air defense systems.

=== 11 November ===
Ukrainian troops entered the city of Kherson with little fighting, while the front line reached the western bank of the Dniepro.

== See also ==
- Outline of the Russo-Ukrainian War
- Bibliography of Ukrainian history
