= Timeline of the Russo-Ukrainian war (2022–present) =

- Prelude; (up to 23 February 2022); Initial invasion; (24 February – 7 April 2022); Southeastern front; (8 April – 28 August 2022); 2022 Ukrainian counteroffensives; (29 August – 11 November 2022); Second stalemate; (12 November 2022 – 7 June 2023); 2023 Ukrainian counteroffensive; (8 June 2023 – 31 August 2023); 2023 Ukrainian counteroffensive, cont.; (1 September – 30 November 2023); 2023–2024 winter campaigns; (1 December 2023 – 31 March 2024); 2024 spring and summer campaigns; (1 April – 31 July 2024); 2024 summer–autumn offensives; (1 August – 31 December 2024); 2025 winter–spring offensives; (1 January 2025 – 31 May 2025); 2025 summer offensives; (1 June 2025 – 31 August 2025); 2025 autumn–winter offensives; (1 September 2025 – 31 December 2025); 2026 winter–spring offensives; (1 January 2026 – 31 May 2026); 2026 summer offensives; (1 June 2026 – 31 August 2026); 2026 autumn–winter offensives; (1 September 2026 – present)

On 24 February 2022, Russia launched a military invasion of Ukraine in a steep escalation of the Russo-Ukrainian war. The campaign had been preceded by a Russian military buildup since early 2021 and numerous Russian demands for security measures and legal prohibitions against Ukraine joining NATO.

== Prelude ==
On 10 November 2021, the United States reported an unusual movement of Russian troops near Ukraine's borders. On 7 December, US president Joe Biden warned President of Russia Vladimir Putin of "strong economic and other measures" if Russia attacked Ukraine. On 17 December 2021, Putin proposed a prohibition on Ukraine joining NATO, which Ukraine rejected.

On 17 January 2022, Russian troops began arriving in Russia's ally Belarus, ostensibly "for military exercises". On 24 January, NATO put troops on standby. On 25 January, Russian military exercises involving 6,000 troops and 60 jets took place in Russia near Ukraine and Crimea. On 10 February, Russia and Belarus began 10 days of military maneuvers. Fighting escalated in separatist regions of eastern Ukraine on the 17th. On 21 February, Vladimir Putin officially ordered Russian forces to enter the separatist republics in eastern Ukraine. He also announced Russian recognition of the two pro-Russian breakaway regions in eastern Ukraine (the Donetsk People's Republic and the Luhansk People's Republic).

== 2022 Ukrainian counteroffensives ==
A Ukrainian counteroffensive in Kherson Oblast and a Ukrainian counteroffensive in Kharkiv Oblast both resulted in Ukrainian victories, ending with the liberation of Kherson.

== 2023 Ukrainian counteroffensive ==
In early June 2023, Ukraine launched a substantial counteroffensive against Russian forces occupying its territory with a long-term goal of breaching the frontlines. However, by the end of 2023, the offensive had ended in failure.

== 2026 campaigns ==
On 25 June, President Zelenskyy approved a 40-day influence operation of long-range, mid-range and SBU operations to push Russia toward ending the war, extending the influence operation on 4 August. UATV reported that the first 40-day operation had disabled 30% of Russia's oil-refining capacity, damaged 80% of Wildberries logistics centres, other high-value military and logistics targets had been struck and that U.S. Secretary of State Marco Rubio had acknowledged this by saying "long-range strikes by Ukraine's armed forces have changed the dynamics of the war." The long-range drone strikes included targeting Russian military industrial sites and oil refineries, including dramatically around Moscow and St Petersburg, causing a fuel crisis for civilian vehicles.

From 8 July, Ukraine started attacking Russian vessels in the Sea of Azov using drones, in part impeding the supply of Crimea alongside attacks on vehicles travelling on the R280 highway. About 90 vessels were attacked in under a week. In consequence on 10 July Russia suspended shipping entering the Sea of Azov from the Volga–Don Canal. Forbes Russia reported the attacks had stopped a quarter of Russian grain exports causing global wheat prices to increase by about 4%. Ukraine reported that by 13 August drones had struck nearly 220 Russian vessels in the Sea of Azov and the Black Sea, including oil tankers, grain ships and passenger ferries.

On 10 to 12 July, Russia launched missile and drone attacks on the Port of Chornomorsk near Odesa, stating they struck port infrastructure, fuel storage tanks, an ammunition warehouse, and also two ferries and a container ship. In consequence, Ukrainian agricultural group Kernel Holding suspended its operations at Chornomorsk. Russian attacks continued, with LIGA.net reporting that during July port infrastructure was attacked 67 times with vessels attacked 22 times at sea and 35 times in port, compared to 14 attacks on Ukrainian vessels during all of 2025. On 22 July, Maersk announced it had suspended its shipping service to Ukraine, and on 23 July shipping to deep-water ports in the Odesa area (Chornomorsk, Port of Odesa, Pivdennyi Port) was completely suspended due to the Russian attacks, though the Minister of Agrarian Policy and Food Taras Vysotsky stated there were other routes available such as road transport and the Danube Delta port of Izmail. The New York Times reported that the Russian attacks appeared to be a response to Ukraine's Sea of Azov attacks, and that the three deep-sea ports usually shipped 60% of Ukraine's monthly exports of $3.5 billion which had been largely protected by the Black Sea Grain Initiative agreement.

In August, US Vice President JD Vance requested that Ukraine pause attacks on tankers carrying Kazakhstan produced crude oil from the Russian Port of Novorossiysk, that had been transited there through the Caspian Pipeline Consortium oil pipeline, to which Ukraine agreed. US companies Chevron and Exxon own 50% and 25% respectively of the Tengiz oilfield, Kazakhstan's largest oilfield.

Ukraine's grain exports fell by 75% in first half of August and local grain prices fell below production costs, jeopardising decisions to sow grain for the following year.

On 13 August, Ukraine reported it had, via a third party, sent Russia an offer that they both halt attacks on civilian vessels and ports in the Black Sea. Deputy Russian Foreign Minister Alexander Grushko said that while they had heard many truce calls through various channels, they had not received any formal proposal.

In the last week of August, Russia started making drone attacks in Kyiv during daylight hours rather than only at night. Attacks included repeatedly targeted warehouses in and around Kyiv, using jet-powered drones which Ukraine could not effectively intercept, leaving some supermarket shelves bare. An ammunition warehouse near a residential area on the western outskirts of Kyiv was struck on 29 August 2026, triggering a chain of secondary explosions, killing 38 with about 400 residents evacuated. President Zelensky said the decision to store explosives near an residential area was unacceptable and "Criminal proceedings have been opened on charges of official negligence." The Russian Ministry of Defence stated they had targeted "an ammunition depot" holding "components and launch boosters for FP-1/FP-2 long-range unmanned aerial vehicles".

In October 2025, the U.S. had agreed to supply the intelligence to facilitate long-range Ukrainian missile strikes on Russia's energy infrastructure, however on 13 September 2026, President Trump asked President Zelenskyy to stop attacks on Russian oil refineries which he blamed for record U.S. prices of diesel fuel, telling reporters "Let him go after targets but not diesel fuel, because he's causing a shortage". Russia had recently stopped diesel exports to improve domestic supplies.

On 20 September, during the 2026 Russian legislative election, Ukraine carried out its largest drone attack on the Moscow area. The Russian Ministry of Defense stated that over 1,900 drones, eight guided aerial bombs, eight cruise missiles and four other missiles had been shot down overnight. Three people were killed and the Gazprom Neft Moscow refinery was damaged. President Zelenskyy said that FP-5 Flamingo and FP-7 Pelican missiles were used in the attack.

== See also ==
- Modern history of Ukraine
- Peace negotiations in the Russo-Ukrainian war (2022–present)
- Timeline of the annexation of Crimea by the Russian Federation
- International recognition of the Donetsk People's Republic and the Luhansk People's Republic
- List of military engagements during the Russo-Ukrainian war (2022–present)
- List of Russian generals killed during the Russo-Ukrainian war (2022–present)
- List of conflicts in territory of the former Soviet Union
- Second Cold War – Term referring to heightened tensions in the 21st century
- Territorial control during the Russo-Ukrainian War
- Timeline of the war in Donbas
