= Sofyino =

Sofyino Софьино
- Village
- Location within Bashkortostan Location within Russia
- Coordinates: 54°02′N 56°15′E
- Country: Russia
- Region: Bashkortostan
- District: Gafuriysky District
- Time zone: UTC+5:00

Sofyino (Russian: Софьино) is a rural locality (a village) in Beloozersky Selsoviet, Gafuriysky District, Bashkortostan, Russia. As of 2010, the population was 6. The village contains 1 street.

== Geography ==
Sofyino is located 37 km northwest of Krasnousolsky (the district's administrative centre) by road. Maly Nagadak is the nearest rural locality.
