= Dmytro Lytvyn (advisor) =

Ukrainian presidential advisor (born 1984)

Dmytro Volodymyrovych Lytvyn
- Дмитро Володимирович Литвин

Advisor to the President of Ukraine
- Incumbent
- Assumed office 8 September 2024
- President: Volodymyr Zelenskyy

Personal details
- Born: 14 May 1984 (age 42) Kyiv, Ukraine
- Education: State University of Trade and Economics
- Occupation: journalist

Dmytro Volodymyrovych Lytvyn (Ukrainian: Дмитро Володимирович Литвин, born 14 May 1984) is a Ukrainian journalist who has served as speechwriter to President Volodymyr Zelenskyy since the 2022 Russian invasion of Ukraine, and as his communications advisor since 2024.

== Early life ==
Dmytro Lytvyn was born in the Lypky district of Kyiv in 1984. He studied law at the State University of Trade and Economics and graduated in 2006, but never practised law, and became a journalist and blogger. In 2012, he joined the Inter TV channel.

== Work with Zelenskyy ==
Lytvyn supported Volodymyr Zelenskyy in the 2019 Ukrainian presidential election, which Zelenskyy won. Ukrainska Pravda has written that Lytvyn knew Zelenskyy when he was filming Servant of the People, but Lytvyn has said this is false and he did not personally know Zelenskyy before the 2019 campaign.

At the start of 2020, Yevheniia Kravchuk, a deputy from Zelenskyy's Servant of the People party, contacted Lytvyn and brought him into the government team, where he gave media advice to the party's deputies. After Mykhailo Podolyak became an advisor to presidential office head Andriy Yermak in April 2020, Lytvyn started working more closely with the office, but did not yet work directly with Zelenskyy. He left Inter in January 2021.

=== 2022 Russian invasion of Ukraine ===
On the morning of 24 February 2022, when Russia launched its full-scale invasion of Ukraine, Lytvyn went to the presidential compound on Bankova Street, where he stayed for a month. He soon started writing speeches for Zelenskyy, and was in daily contact with him; they occupied nearby rooms in the compound. Over time, he became Zelenskyy's main speechwriter and was entrusted with Zelenskyy's international speeches; others have also been involved such as former Kvartal 95 screenwriter Yuriy Kostiuk. Lytvyn has said that the ideas behind the speeches came from Zelenskyy himself. Presidential office advisor Serhiy Leshchenko called Lytvyn Zelenskyy's "literary and creative assistant", and said that Lytvyn "collects the president's ideas each day" and "translates them into prose".

On 8 September 2024, Zelenskyy appointed Lytvyn as his communications advisor.

Lytvyn has been described as a "key figure" in the presidential office, as he speaks with Zelenskyy every day.

In October 2024, Ukrainska Pravda accused Lytvyn of blocking officials from talking to its journalists, which Lytvyn denied.
