= Chervone =

Chervone (Ukrainian: Червоне) is a toponym of several populated localities in Ukraine, predominantly villages.

- Chervone, Zhytomyr Oblast, an urban-type settlement in Berdychiv Raion, Zhytomyr Oblast
- Chervone, Crimea, a rural settlement in Rozdolne Raion, Autonomous Republic of Crimea
- Chervone-Pustohorod was a Soviet air base
- Former name of Stare Selo, a village in Sumy Oblast in Ukraine
- Former name of Esman, a village in Sumy Oblast, Ukraine
