= Timeline of the Russo-Ukrainian war (12 November 2022 – 7 June 2023) =

Timeline of the Russo-Ukrainian war (2022–present)
- Prelude; (up to 23 February 2022); Initial invasion; (24 February – 7 April 2022); Southeastern front; (8 April – 28 August 2022); 2022 Ukrainian counteroffensives; (29 August – 11 November 2022); Second stalemate; (12 November 2022 – 7 June 2023); 2023 Ukrainian counteroffensive; (8 June 2023 – 31 August 2023); 2023 Ukrainian counteroffensive, cont.; (1 September – 30 November 2023); 2023–2024 winter campaigns; (1 December 2023 – 31 March 2024); 2024 spring and summer campaigns; (1 April – 31 July 2024); 2024 summer–autumn offensives; (1 August – 31 December 2024); 2025 winter–spring offensives; (1 January 2025 – 31 May 2025); 2025 summer offensives; (1 June 2025 – 31 August 2025); 2025 autumn–winter offensives; (1 September 2025 – 31 December 2025); 2026 winter–spring offensives; (1 January 2026 – 31 May 2026); 2026 summer offensives; (1 June 2026 – 31 August 2026); 2026 autumn–winter offensives; (1 September 2026 – present)

This timeline of the Russo-Ukrainian war covers the period from 12 November 2022, following the conclusion of Ukraine's Kherson and Kharkiv counteroffensives, to 7 June 2023, the day before the 2023 Ukrainian counteroffensive began. Russia continued its strikes against Ukrainian infrastructure while the battle of Bakhmut escalated.

== November 2022 ==
=== 14 November ===
The United Nations General Assembly passed a resolution that held Russia responsible for all damage caused to Ukraine by the invasion and demanded reparations.

=== 15 November ===
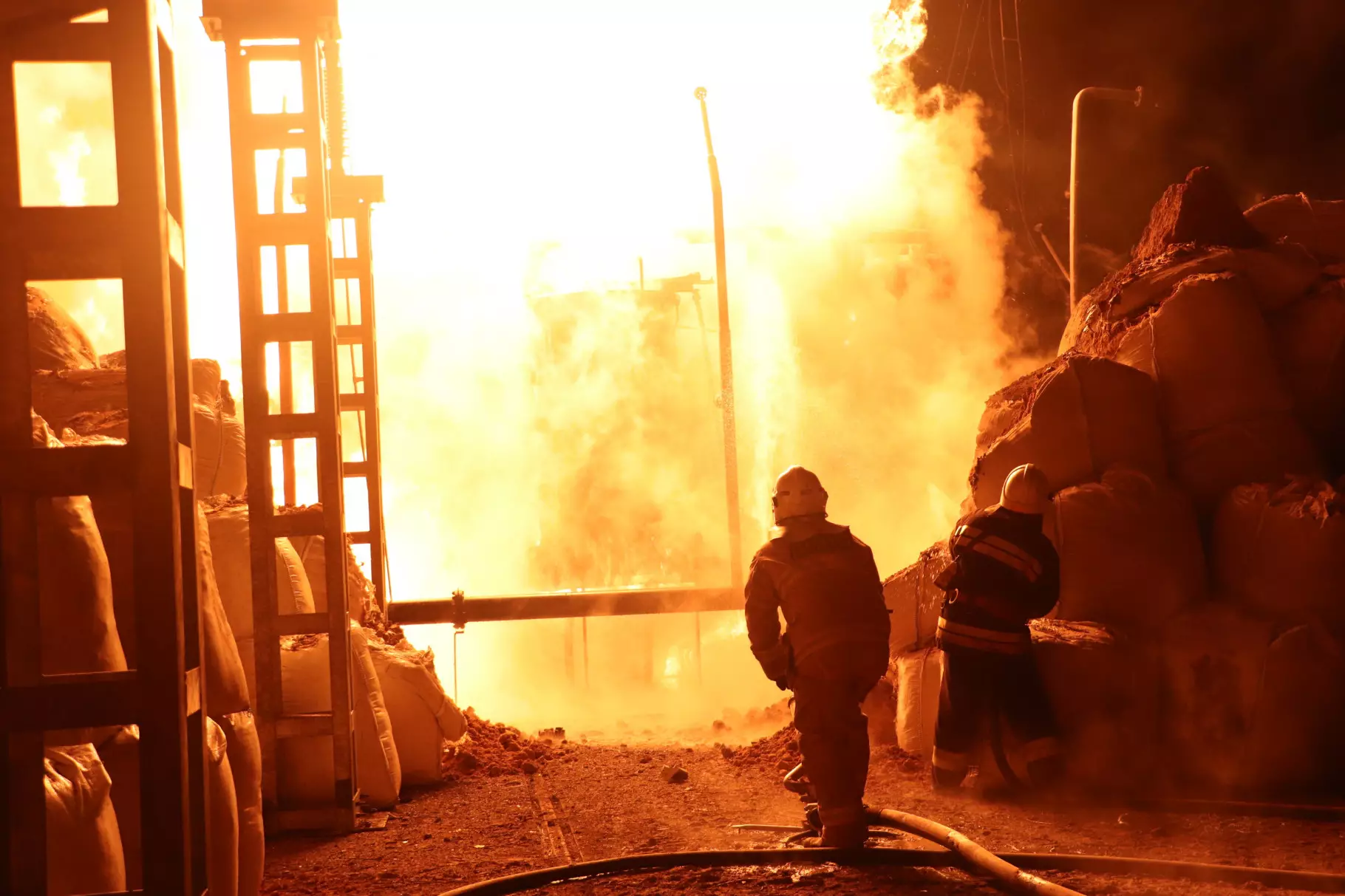
Fire after strike on an infrastructure facility in Kyiv Oblast

Russia launched about 85 to 100 missiles at a number of Ukrainian cities. The strategic bombing campaign caused severe shortages of electricity and water at multiple cities. According to the Ukrainian Air Force some 77 of 96 Russian missiles were shot down. A Pentagon official claimed the Russian plan was to exhaust the Ukrainian air defences. At one stage some 50 missiles were in combat "within minutes" near the Polish border.

A missile crossed over the Ukrainian-Polish border and struck the village of Przewodów, killing two civilians. Top leaders in Poland held an emergency meeting. Initial assessments by the United States found that the missile was likely to have been an air defence missile fired by Ukrainian forces at an incoming Russian missile.

According to Ukraine's Operational Command South, Ukrainian rocket and artillery units attacked Russian positions on the left bank of the Dnipro River and in the area of the Kinburn Spit.

=== 16 November ===
The Ukrainians claimed to have killed or wounded 50 Russian soldiers in a long-range strike on the village of Denezhnykove, in Luhansk Oblast.

=== 17 November ===
After the missile strikes, more than 10 million people were without power by 17 November, but a day later Ukrainian officials reported that electricity had already been restored to "nearly 100%" of Ukraine.

According to Ukrainian officials, one of the wrecks of missiles found after a missile attack earlier that day was that of an "X-55/Kh-55" cruise missile. These missiles were apparently incapable of carrying a conventional warhead, but this specific missile had an "imitation block" (model for training) of a nuclear bomb. They believed the missile was meant to help overwhelm Ukraine's missile defenses.

=== 19 November ===
The Ukrainians claimed to have killed 60 Russian soldiers in a long-range strike on the village of Mykhailkva, 40 km south of Kherson. It was the second such strike in four days.

=== 23 November ===
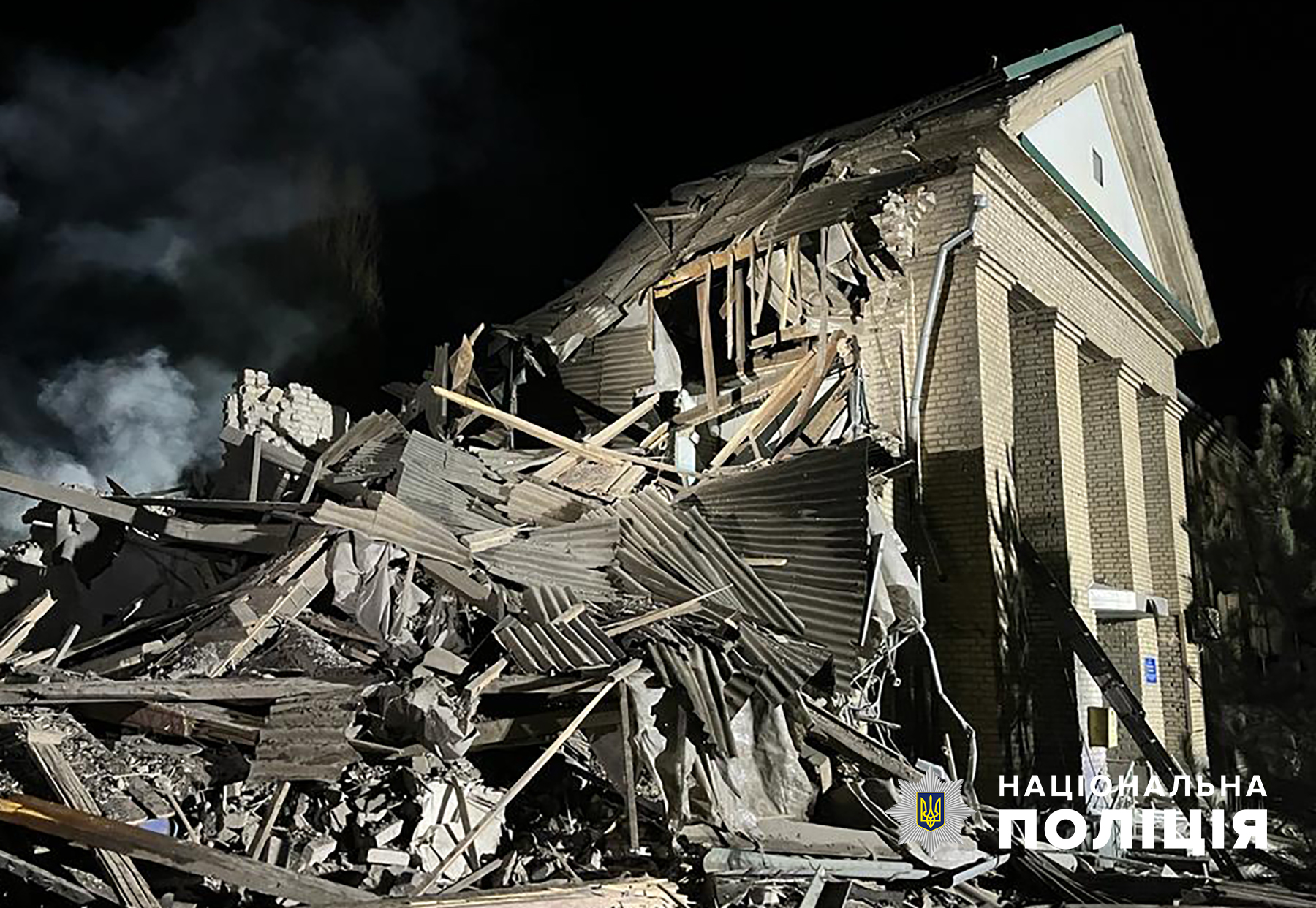
Hospital in Vilniansk after missile strike on 23 November

The European Parliament declared Russia a "state sponsor of terrorism" for the way it had systematically attacked civilians and committed war crimes. This declaration was symbolic, but called for more sanctions.

The Russian military launched 65 to 70 missiles at civilian settlements and energy infrastructure, although 51 of those were said to have been shot down. The attack caused blackouts over much of Ukraine and forced several nuclear power plants to shut down. Much of Moldova also experienced blackouts due to the power grid failure in Ukraine.

=== 25 November ===
According to U.S. and Ukrainian officials, about 1/3 of Western-supplied artillery went out of action in Ukraine due to wear-related mechanical problems. The United States European Command was said to have a repair base in Poland, but there were problems in transporting the weapons there from the front.

=== 28 November ===
The Russian army was actively pushing on both sides of Bakhmut, in Donetsk Oblast. The Russians were trying to encircle the town but were making very slow progress, according to observers.

=== 29 November ===
Jens Stoltenberg, the Secretary-General of NATO, made a speech at the meeting of NATO foreign ministers at Bucharest, in which he expressed the alliance's commitment to support Ukraine for as long as is required, because allowing Russia to win would only embolden President Vladimir Putin. He also promised Ukraine that NATO would one day accept them as a member and that Putin cannot deny sovereign nations the right to make their own sovereign decisions that were not a threat to Russia. He also speculated that the main challenges to Putin were democracy and freedom.

=== 30 November ===
Ursula von der Leyen, president of the European Commission, suggested the creation of a UN court to investigate war crimes committed by Russia. Russia does not recognize the International Criminal Court, so the European Commission proposed two possible alternative ways to hold Russia accountable: either to create a court that would be set up by international treaties, or to create an international court with a number of judges from several countries. She estimated the war damage to Ukraine is about 600 billion Euros. She proposed a financial plan to help pay for this. She pointed out that the EU had frozen 300 billion Euros worth of Russian central bank reserves and 20 billion Euros worth of money belonging to Russian oligarchs, which she suggested should be invested. The investments could be given to Ukraine when sanctions are lifted. The original statement by Ursula von der Leyen included a claim that 100,000 Ukrainian soldiers and 20,000 Ukrainian civilians have been killed so far in the war. This angered Ukrainian military officials, who said that the death toll was classified information. In response, the European Commission edited the video of von der Leyen's speech to remove this information. Official publications of the text of the speech were also edited to omit the numbers.

== December 2022 ==
=== 2 December ===
Ukrainian Presidential Advisor Mykhailo Podolyak claimed that 10–13,000 Ukrainian soldiers have been killed since 24 February, the figure last given in August was 9,000.

The Ukrainians struck a Russian concentration near Starobilsk, in the rear area of Luhansk Oblast, reportedly killing 14 Russian personnel and wounding 30.

=== 5 December ===
Explosions were reported at two Russian airbases: the one at Engels-2 reportedly damaged two Tu-95s; the other at the Dyagilevo military airbase near Ryazan, destroyed a fuel truck and killed three, injuring five. The Russian Ministry of Defence stated Ukraine attempted to strike Russia's long-range aviation bombers with Soviet-made jet drones, and that the drones were subsequently shot down at low altitude when approaching the air bases. The attack involved the use of Tu-141 drones that were taken out of storage and appeared to have been fitted with improvised explosives. While no significant damage or burn marks were visible on satellite images of Engels-2, at least one Tu-22M3 bomber was visually confirmed to be slightly damaged at Dyagilevo.

Following the attacks, Russia launched a renewed wave of missile strikes against Ukraine, consisting of about 70 cruise missiles. Ukraine claimed 60 missiles were shot down, Russia claimed 17 targets were hit on the ground. As a result, a missile fell into the territory of Moldova, near the city of Briceni.

=== 6 December ===
The Governor of Kursk Oblast in Russia, Roman Starovoyt, claimed that a Ukrainian drone attack destroyed an oil tank near an airbase. No reports of casualties and the fire was under control. There was no comment from Ukraine on these claims.

=== 7 December ===
Gathered remains of Russian Uragan, Smerch, and S-300 rockets in Kharkiv. 52,000 explosive objects were disposed in Kharkiv region as of 7 December 2022.

Russian President Vladimir Putin acknowledged that the "special military operation" was taking longer than expected but claimed the country's nuclear arsenal was preventing the conflict from escalating. As in June 2022, he made another reference to the expansion of the Russian Empire by Peter the Great.

The Ukrainian General Staff claimed to have launched multiple strikes against Russian logistic lines near the cities of Berdyansk, Tokmak, Melitopol, Enerhodar, Dniprorudne, Polohy, and Vasylivka, Zaporizhia Oblast. They claimed 240 Russians were wounded and 20 pieces of military equipment were destroyed in the strikes.

=== 9 December ===
President Putin revealed that he was considering adopting the concept of the "preemptive strike" from the U.S. According to him, the U.S. openly discussed this policy some years ago, but currently Russia was only just thinking about it. A few hours after Putin's statement, Jens Stoltenberg, general secretary of NATO, warned that there was a real possibility of a major war between Russia and NATO.

Russia re-occupied the previously liberated Dnipro river island of Ostriv Velykyi Potomkin close to Kherson. This was confirmed by presidential advisor Oleksii Arestovych and Lieutenant Colonel Konstiantyn Mashovets, as well as some unofficial Russian sources. The General Staff of the Ukrainian Armed Forces claimed on 15 December that Russia had begun the process of forcibly deporting the island's civilian residents.

=== 10 December ===
Russia used Iranian-made drones to hit two energy facilities in Odesa, leaving all non-critical infrastructure in the Ukrainian port without power and 1.5 million people without electricity.

Ukraine launched a missile attack on the Russian-occupied city of Melitopol including at a military barracks. According to Melitopol's Russia-installed administrators, four missiles hit the city, killing two people. In addition, explosions were reported in Donetsk and Crimea.

=== 11 December ===
Ukrainian President Volodymyr Zelenskyy said that Russian forces have turned the city of Bakhmut into "burned ruins".

The Ukrainians killed up to 60 and injured nearly 100 Russian soldiers near Kadiivka, Luhansk Oblast. They also killed 150 Russian soldiers and destroyed 10 pieces of equipment during strikes in Zaporizhzhia Oblast.

=== 12 December ===
President Zelenskyy appealed to the G7 for tanks, artillery and long range weapons. In response, the G7 pledged to meet Ukraine's requirements.

Luhansk's exiled Governor Serhiy Haidai claimed that Ukraine's armed forces killed personnel from the Wagner Group, a private military company in the Luhansk Region.

The UK sanctioned Russian military commanders for missile attacks and Iranian businessmen for the production and supply of military drones. The EU sanctioned 20 individuals and one entity of Iran over human rights abuse. European Union Foreign Ministers claimed that they had evidence to support Iran supplying Shahed-136 drones to Russia despite denials from both countries.

=== 13 December ===
Robert Magowan, a British lieutenant general and former commander of the Royal Marines, revealed that the Royal Marines were involved several times in "secret operations" in Ukraine, in "extremely sensitive context", involving "a high level of political and military risk".

Denis Pushilin, Acting head of Donetsk's People of Republic claimed that half of Donetsk Oblast was under Russian control.

=== 14 December ===
Three explosions were heard in the centre of Kyiv; President Zelenskyy claimed that Ukrainian air defence forces shot down 13 Shahed-136 drones.

Reports emerged that U.S. officials were finalising and preparing to announce a plan to provide Ukraine with the sophisticated Patriot air defence system, agreeing to an urgent request from Ukrainian leaders amid increasing Russian missile attacks against Ukraine's infrastructure. The Biden administration was reluctant to deploy the system for months, as a Patriot battery complex would need at least 90 trained troops to operate and maintain it, along with concerns that it would provoke Russia to escalate.

The Ukrainian Parliament's Commissioner for Human Rights Dmytro Lubinets claimed that a children's torture chamber had been uncovered in Kherson.

Andrii Yermak, Chief of Staff of the Office of President Zelenskyy, stated that they released around 64 military personnel and a US citizen during a prisoner swap deal with Russia.

=== 15 December ===
President Zelenskyy stated that Russia should start to withdraw their troops by Christmas as a step to end the conflict. Russia responded that there would be "No Christmas Ceasefire" until Ukraine accepted its loss of territory.

The Kyiv School of Economics published a report estimating that, as of November 2022, Russia's invasion had caused $136 billion in direct damage to Ukraine's infrastructure. Energy infrastructure, industry, public, and private enterprises were impacted the most.

USAID delivered four excavators and over 130 generators to Kyiv for use in "boiler houses and heat supply stations" according to mayor Vitali Klitschko.

The recently liberated city of Kherson was entirely without power following Russian shelling, which killed at least two people. The Kherson military administration stated that the city was hit 86 times with "artillery, MLRS, tanks, mortars and UAVs," in the past 24 hours.

In the Donbas, Ukrainian forces bombarded Donetsk in the largest wave of shelling seen since 2014, according to mayor Alexey Kulemzin.

Volker Türk, the United Nations High Commissioner for Human Rights, published a detailed summary of 441 killings including 8 girls during the conflict.

The United States expanded its training to 500 Ukrainians each month at Germany.

=== 16 December ===
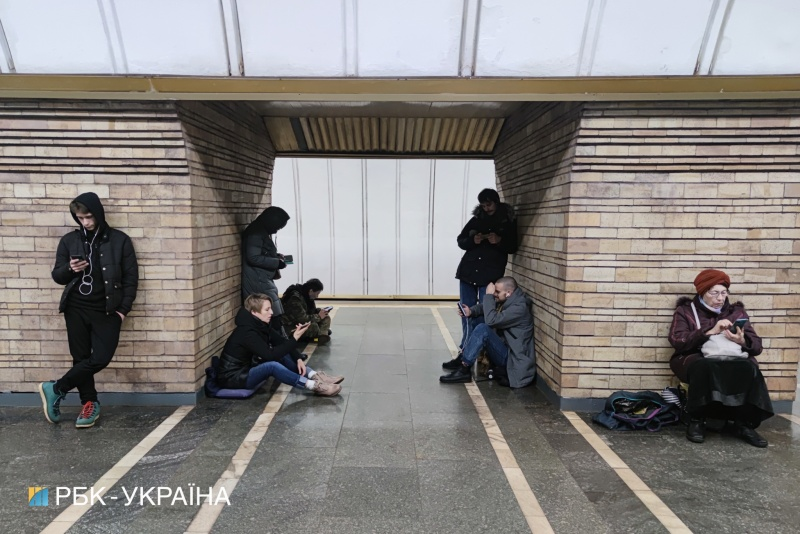
Civilians shelter in the Kyiv Metro during a Russian missile attack, 16 December

Russia launched around 76 missiles on Kyiv, Kharkiv, Poltava, and Kremenchuk, destroying infrastructure. Reports suggested at least four were killed in Kryvyi Rih. The missiles were fired at nine power plants; Ukraine claimed 60 were intercepted.

A Ukrainian strike on the village of Lantrativka, in Luhansk Oblast, officially killed 11 Russian trench diggers, but eyewitnesses claimed 84 were killed.

=== 17 December ===
Missiles were launched targeting infrastructure on Kyiv, Kharkiv, Kryvyi Rih and Zaporizhzhia. Kyiv council member Ksenia Semenova stated that approximately 60% of residents were without power and 70% were without water. Ukraine restored power and water to approximately 6 million residents in 24 hours. 37 out of the 40 missiles fired at Kyiv were intercepted.

Russia started a new campaign on TV to recruit more soldiers. One advertisement showed some men leaving for Georgia. An old woman drops her groceries and men who have not left help her pick them up. She then says: "The boys have left, the men stayed."

=== 18 December ===
The Russian government recruited musicians to boost morale. The so-called "front-line creative brigade" was to be made up from mobilised soldiers and musicians who have volunteered.

=== 19 December ===
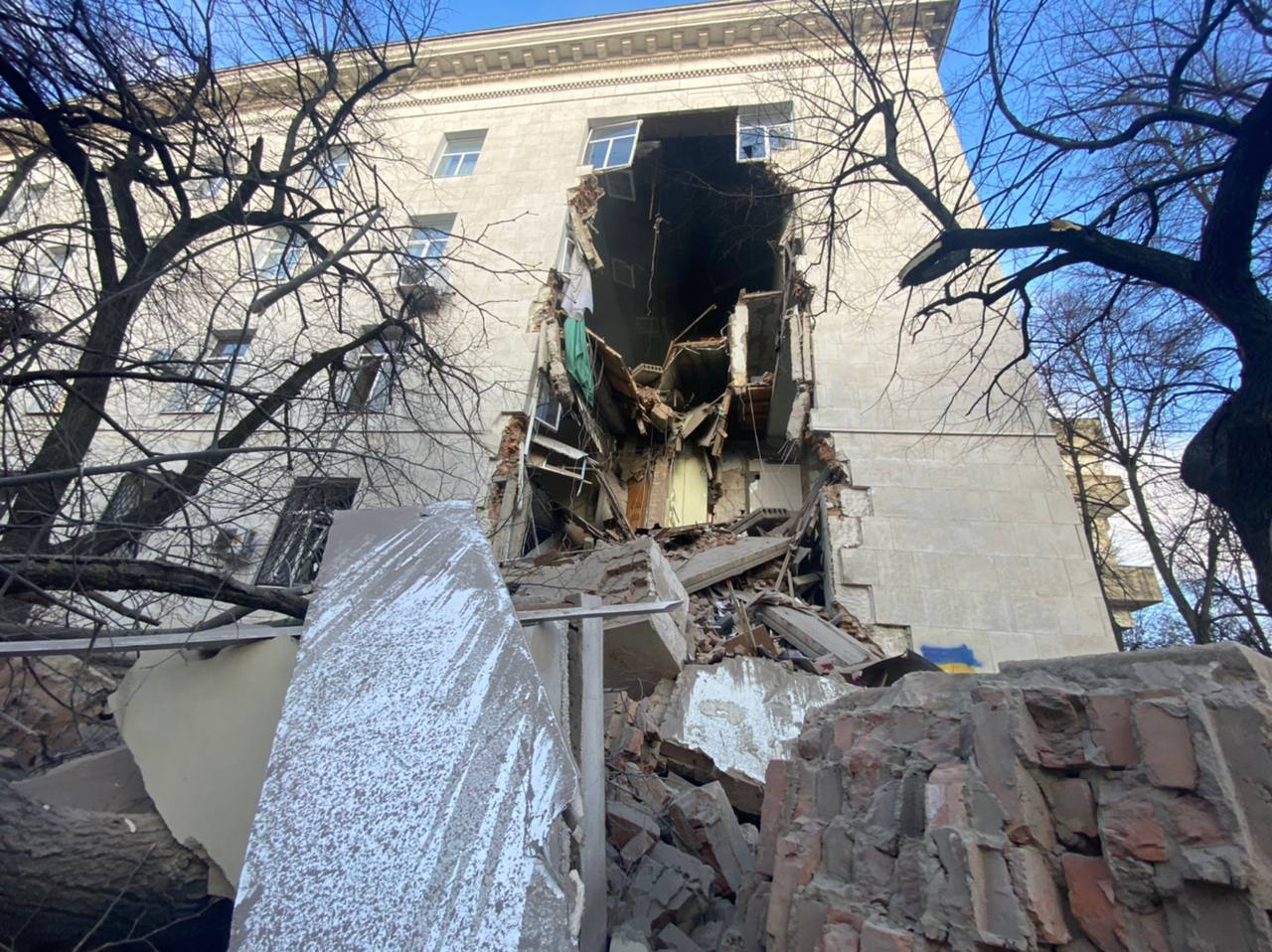
Building of Kherson Oblast State Administration after Russian strike on 19 December

According to the Ukrainian Air Force, Russia attacked Ukraine's infrastructure with 35 Iranian kamikaze drones, 30 of which were said to have been shot down. 23 of the drones attacked Kyiv (according to the city officials, 18 of them were shot down). An infrastructure facility was damaged, leaving three areas in Kyiv without power. Energy shortages caused interruptions in heat and water supply. Mykolaiv and Kherson regions were also attacked. Building of Kherson Oblast State Administration was partially destroyed.

=== 20 December ===
President Putin stated that the situation was "extremely difficult" in the four areas of Russia-annexed Ukraine. Putin ordered the Federal Security Services to step up surveillance at the country's borders to combat "emergence of new threats" from abroad and traitors.

President Zelenskyy visited the Bakhmut region.

Russian energy exporter Gazprom said that despite a fatal explosion at the Urengoy–Pomary–Uzhhorod pipeline they were able to supply gas to their customers using parallel pipelines without any shortages.

=== 21 December ===
The United States said it was aiming to provide military aid of $1.8 billion USD including the Patriot missile system.

President Zelenskyy met US President Joe Biden during his visit and addressed a joint session of the US Congress after Speaker of the House Nancy Pelosi invited Zelenskyy.

Citing the influx of conscripts from the 2022 Russian mobilization, Russian Minister of Defence Sergei Shoigu announced that the Moscow Military District was being re-established, alongside the Leningrad Military District. This was later confirmed in June 2023 by Deputy Chief of the General Staff Yevgeny Burdinsky.

=== 22 December ===
United States National Security Council spokesperson John Kirby estimated that the Wagner Group deployed 40,000 mercenaries of recruited convicts and 10,000 mercenaries. The North Korean Foreign ministry denied US claims that it was supplying "infantry rockets and missiles into Russia".

Speaking to reporters, President Putin referred to the invasion of Ukraine as a "war" and also said that the U.S. Patriot system is "old and does not work as well as the Russian S-300 missile system". Critics stated that referring to the conflict as a "war" is considered a crime under a censorship law signed in March 2022, with a penalty of up to 15 years in prison, and called for the prosecution of Putin.

Ukrainian game developer Volodymyr Yezhov was killed defending Bakhmut

=== 23 December ===
The Netherlands pledged up to 2.5 billion euros to help Ukraine in 2023. This aid was to pay for military equipment and rebuilding critical infrastructure. President Zelenskyy thanked them for this pledge.

=== 24 December ===
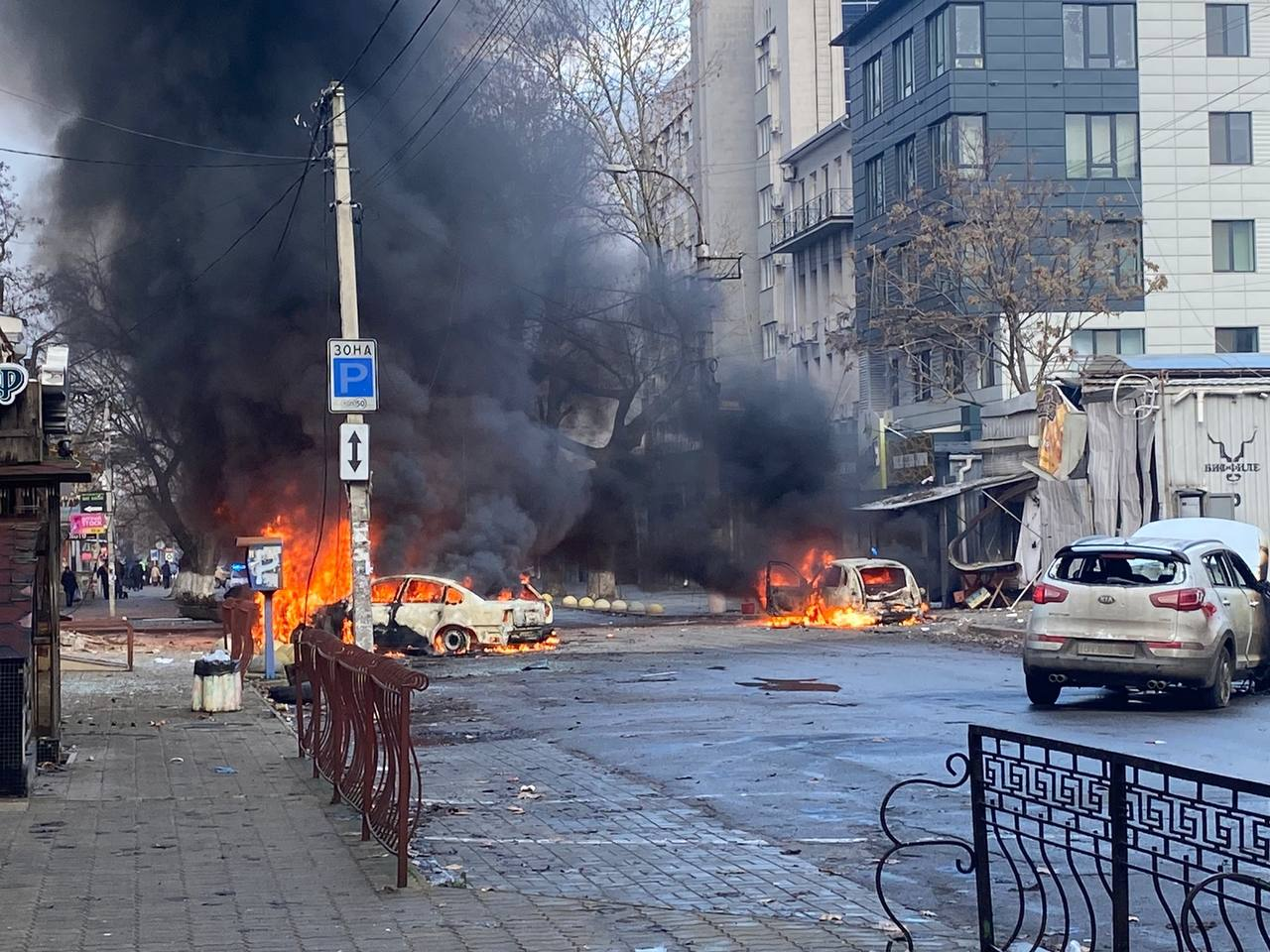
Kherson after the shelling

Russian forces shelled Kherson leaving 10 dead and 55 injured according to Ukrainian officials. President Zelenskyy stated that the shelling first hit a department store and then a market.

The Russian army placed three battalions near the Ukrainian border, inside Belarus. The Ukrainian military considered further securing the northern border.

Pavel Antov, a Russian billionaire and member of the United Russia party for a regional parliament, died after a fall from a hotel in India. Described as a "sausage magnate", Antov was the 12th high-profile Russian businessman reported to have died due to suicide or an accident. Having previously made anti-war comments on WhatsApp, he claimed it was due to a "technical error". Another Russian, and friend of Antov's, Vladimir Budanov also died at the same hotel just two days before.

=== 25 December ===
Putin stated that Russia was ready for negotiation, but claimed that Kyiv and its Western backers refused to engage in talks.

=== 26 December ===
Russia claimed to have shot down a Ukrainian drone near the Engels-2 (air base). The governor of Saratov Oblast, Roman Busargin, reported no damage to "civilian infrastructure". Three people from the "technical staff" were killed by falling drone wreckage. According to the Russian defence ministry, "a Ukrainian unmanned aerial vehicle was shot down at low altitude" while approaching the airfield. Ukrainian and Russian social media accounts reported that a number of bombers were destroyed.

Russia's Federal Security Service (FSB) reported four Ukrainian saboteurs were killed by landmines during a failed cross-border operation into Bryansk Oblast. The Ukrainians were wearing winter camouflage and carrying German SIG Sauer firearms, navigation equipment, and four bombs.

Ukraine asked the United Nations to expel Russia from the United Nations Security Council, claiming that Russia had illegally taken the seat of the USSR and was a hostile nation that waged illegal wars.

=== 27 December ===
Russian Foreign Minister Sergey Lavrov stated that Ukraine must accept Moscow's peace demands: "Our proposals for the demilitarisation and denazification of the territories controlled by the regime, the elimination of threats to Russia's security emanating from there, including our new lands, are well known to the enemy. The point is simple: Fulfil them for your own good. Otherwise, the issue will be decided by the Russian army."

Russia banned crude oil sales to price cap nations which includes G7, European Union, and Australia. President Putin issued a decree that ban will be effective from 1 February 2023 up to 5 months and stated that sale ban could be lifted to individuals through "specific reasons".

=== 28 December ===
The Department of Foreign Affairs and Trade confirmed the death of Sage O’Donnell, the fourth Australian to die fighting for Ukraine.

The Russian health ministry announced that it will permit Russian soldiers who had been fighting in Ukraine to have their sperm frozen in cryobanks for free.

The Chief of the Main Intelligence Directorate of Ukraine, Kyrylo Budanov said that neither Ukraine nor Russian forces were able to advance.

=== 29 December ===
The Indian Police launched a criminal investigation into the deaths of two Russians in India, including war critic and billionaire Pavel Antov.

Ukrainian Presidential advisor Mykhailo Podolyak stated that over 120 missiles were launched at infrastructure facilities in Kyiv, Kharkiv, Lviv and other cities. Ukraine claimed that 54 of 69 missiles were shot down and three people died in Kyiv; 90% of Lviv and 40% of Kyiv were without power.

Belarus reported that they shot down an S-300 anti-aircraft missile that had been launched targeting rural areas.

The governor of Russia's Saratov Oblast, Roman Busargin, claimed that a Ukrainian drone was shot down near Engels-2 Air Base with only slight damage to residential housing and no injuries. There were unverified reports on social media of air raid sirens and an explosion.

=== 30 December ===
The Ukrainian army claimed to have shot down 16 drones launched by Russian forces at Kyiv and other cities. The Mayor of Kyiv, Vitali Klitschko, stated that two were shot down outside Kyiv while five were shot down "over" Kyiv.

President Putin and Chinese President Xi Jinping held talks via video link in which the latter reassured the former that he would maintain an "objective and fair stance" regarding the situation, according to CCTV.

=== 31 December ===
The head of Ukraine's armed forces, Valerii Zaluzhnyi, claimed that air defences had shot down 12 of 20 Russian cruise missiles. Vitali Klitschko, the Mayor of Kyiv, stated that a series of explosions directed at infrastructure killed at least one person and wounded twenty, including a Japanese journalist. A drone strike on Khmelnytskyi injured two persons.

Russia announced that armed forces fighting in the regions of Donetsk, Luhansk, Kherson and Zaporizhzhia will have their income tax exempted.

== January 2023 ==
=== 1 January ===
The Ukrainian military claimed to have killed 400 Russian soldiers and wounded another 300 during a missile attack on Makiivka in occupied Donetsk. A senior Russian-backed official, blamed the attack on the "American HIMARS", claiming that some 25 rockets were fired at the region. Russia's Ministry of Defence confirmed that a total of 63 Russian soldiers had died in the attack after 6 rockets had been fired. The barracks was based next to an ammunition dump, according to Russian milbloggers, which may explain the large explosion. Bezsonov called for the military officers responsible to be "punished". The General Staff of Ukraine claimed 10 vehicles were destroyed. On 3 January the Russian Ministry of Defence gave an updated figure of 89 dead.

The Ukrainian military claimed that they had shot down 45 kamikaze drones. The Russian attack came several hours after the Ukrainian attack on Makiivka. According to the Mayor of Kyiv, one man was injured by falling debris.

Russian Governor of Bryansk Oblast Alexander Bogomaz claimed that Ukraine launched a drone attack on an electrical facility in the Klimovsky District.

=== 2 January ===
According to TASS, Russian forces shot down a Ukrainian drone near the city of Voronezh.

=== 4 January ===
France announced that it would send AMX-10 RC and ACMAT Bastion to Ukraine.

=== 5 January ===
Russian Orthodox Church Primate Patriarch Kirill called for a Christmas ceasefire so that people could attend Orthodox Christmas services on 6–7 January. Turkish President Recep Tayyip Erdogan also called for a "unilateral cease-fire"; afterwards, Putin ordered the Russian military to hold a 36-hour cease-fire for the Russian Orthodox Christmas. Ukraine rejected Russia's cease-fire proposal. The UK MoD said that fighting had "continued at a routine level into the Orthodox Christmas period."

The first group of 24 prisoners recruited by PMC Wagner, fighting in Ukraine, have finished their six months contracts and have been released with full amnesty for their past crimes.

In a joint statement President Biden and Chancellor Olaf Scholz announced that the German government had decided to provide Ukraine with a Patriot missile system and 40 Marder Infantry Fighting Vehicles, while the United States government would provide around 50 Bradley Fighting Vehicles.

=== 6 January ===
The United States Department of Defence awarded a $40 million contract to L3Harris to provide Ukraine with 4 VAMPIRE kits (vehicle-mountable light guided missile system) in mid 2023 and 10 by 2023 year-end.

=== 8 January ===
The Russian ministry of defence claimed that more than 600 Ukrainian soldiers were killed in an attack on barracks in Kramatorsk. Kramatorsk's Mayor Oleksandr Honcharenko stated that the attack only damaged two buildings and there was no evidence of casualties. A Finnish journalist and several correspondents from Reuters visited the site and found out that an S-300 had struck an empty school building, with no signs of casualties.

=== 9 January ===
Russia and Ukraine conducted their 36th prisoner swap of the conflict, with each side trading 50 POWs to the other.

Ukraine's regional prosecutor's office claimed that an S-300 fired from Belgorod Oblast hit a market in Shevchenkove, killing two women, wounding a child, and damaging a shopping centre.

A spokesperson stated that Germany had no plans to provide the Leopard 2 to Ukraine.

=== 10 January ===
Ukrainian steel production was reduced by about 70% in 2022 as a result of the conflict.

US and Ukrainian officials stated that Russian artillery fire had declined nearly 75% in some places.

The UK said most of Soledar was under Russian control, whereas Wagner claimed all.

=== 11 January ===
Russian Defence Minister Sergei Shoigu appointed Valery Gerasimov in place of Sergey Surovikin as overall commander of the war against Ukraine. Surovikin would serve as Gerasimov's deputy.

The Wagner Group claimed around 500 Ukrainians were killed during the battle of Soledar.

=== 12 January ===
Governor of Donetsk Pavlo Kyrylenko stated that around 100 Russian soldiers had been killed in the Soledar area.

=== 13 January ===
The Russian military stated that it captured Soledar, but Ukraine defence minister Oleksii Reznikov denied that the city had been captured and said the fighting was "very difficult". Governor of Donetsk Pavlo Kyrylenko stated that "559 civilians including 15 children" remained in Soledar and could not be evacuated. Zelenskyy and Ukrainian Deputy Defense Minister Hanna Maliar announced that pockets of resistance in the city center continues, and that the western portion of the settlement remains in Ukrainian hands. Chief of staff to the President of Ukraine Andrii Yermak stated that "Soledar is a scene of street battles, with neither side really in control of the town." Geolocation based on photos suggested that Ukrainian troops were still defending the north western part of the city.

=== 14 January ===
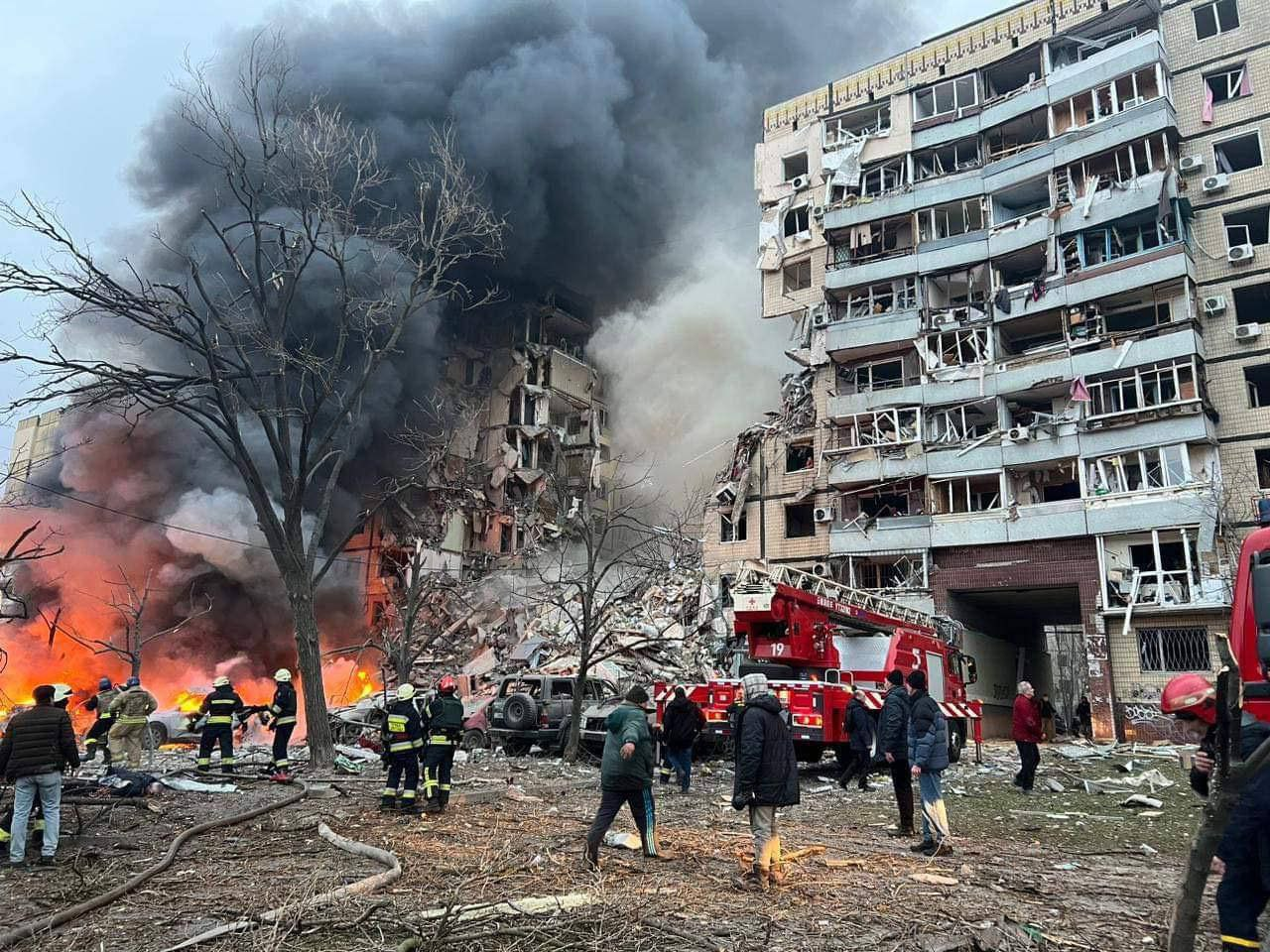
Destroyed apartment building in Dnipro

A new wave of Russian missile strike hit several regions of Ukraine. Kyiv's military administration reported strikes on the capital's critical infrastructure. Kharkiv, Odesa and other cities were also hit.

A Russian missile strike partially destroyed an apartment building in Dnipro, killing at least 46 people and injuring 80.

The United Kingdom stated that it would provide Challenger 2 tanks and artillery systems to Ukraine.

=== 15 January ===
Armin Papperger, the CEO of German arms manufacturer Rheinmetall, stated that the company would not be able to deliver battle-ready Leopard 2 tanks to Ukraine until 2024.

=== 16 January ===
German Defence Minister Christine Lambrecht resigned in part due to blunders over German support for Ukraine.

A grenade exploded in Tonenkoye village's community center, which was used to store ammunition and house Russian soldiers. TASS reported that the RGD-5 grenade explosion in Belgorod Oblast killed 3 soldiers and wounded 16. Eight soldiers were missing.

Russia secured control of Soledar after capturing the last industrial zone near mine number 7 from Ukrainian troops. Ukraine admitted that they had lost Soledar.

=== 17 January ===
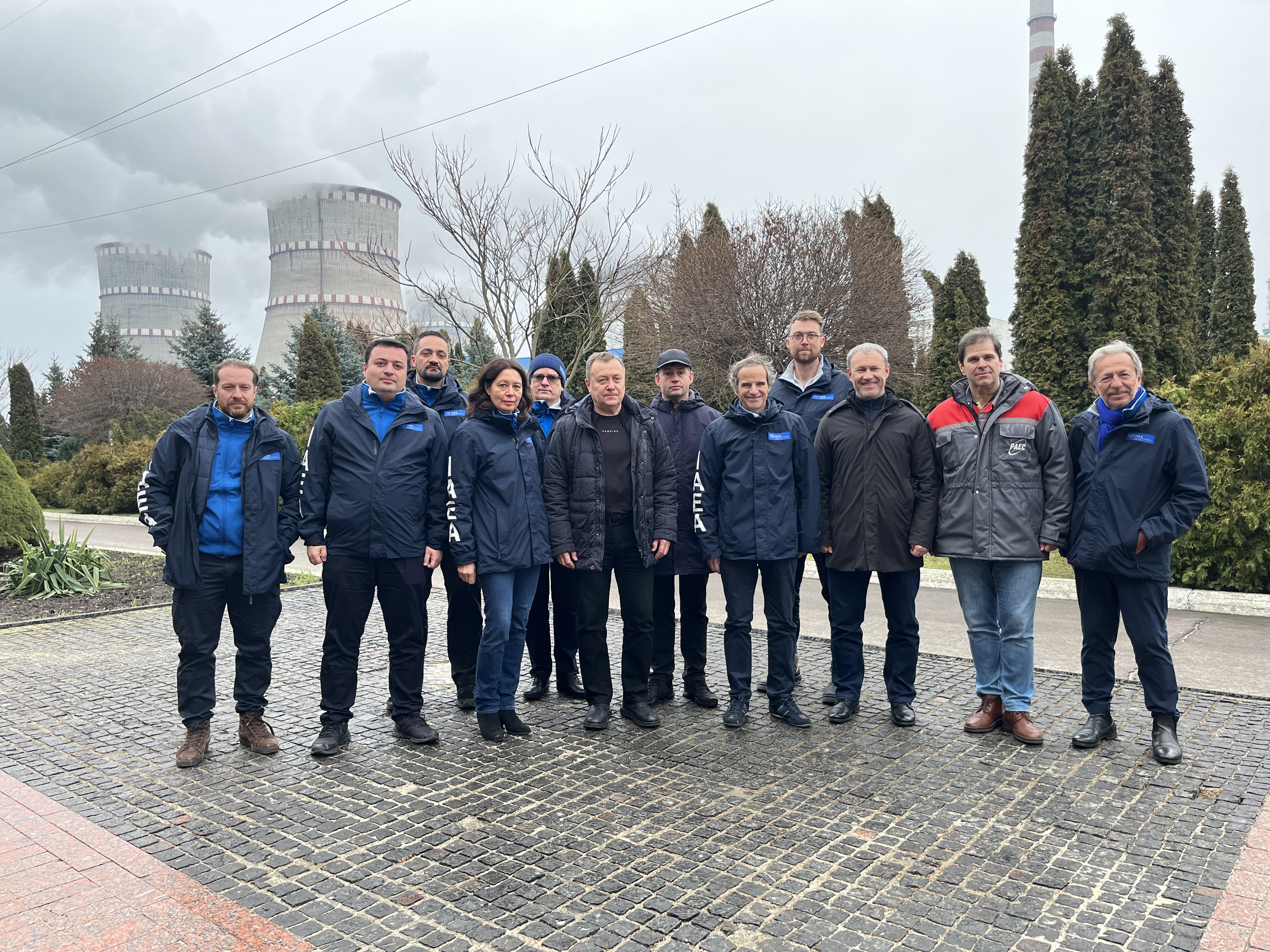
IAEA team visiting the Rivne Nuclear Power Plant, 17 January 2023

The US military stated that Ukrainian soldiers were being trained in the United States on the Patriot Missile system.

Serbian President Aleksandar Vucic condemned PMC Wagner for running a social media campaign calling for Serbian recruits to fight in Ukraine.

=== 18 January ===
Australian defence minister Richard Marles stated that Australian soldiers would be deployed in the UK to train Ukrainian soldiers in "infantry tactics in an urban, wooded and basic" settings.

=== 20 January ===
Ukrainian Defence Minister Oleksii Reznikov stated that despite the lack of agreement to export the tanks, Ukrainian soldiers would be trained on Leopard 2 tanks in Poland.

=== 21 January ===
Russia claimed to have launched a new offensive in Zaporizhzhia Oblast.

=== 22 January ===
German Foreign Minister Annalena Baerbock stated that Germany would not stand in the way if Poland or other countries provide Leopard 2 tanks.

Russian state media reported that Russian forces advanced into Orikhiv and Huliaipole towns in Zaporizhzhia Oblast.

=== 23 January ===
Polish Prime Minister Mateusz Morawiecki stated that Poland will provide 14 Leopard tanks to Ukraine regardless of Germany's approval; the next day, Poland officially requested permission to export them. German Defence Minister Boris Pistorius encouraged other countries to provide training on the tanks for Ukrainian soldiers.

French President Emmanuel Macron stated that France would send Leclerc tanks to Ukraine.

Norwegian defence chief General Eirik Kristoffersen stated that around 180,000 Russian soldiers were dead or wounded and there were around 100,000 military casualties and 30,000 civilian dead from Ukraine.

=== 24 January ===
Several senior and junior ministers resigned from positions in the Ukrainian government, including the deputy head of the President's Office, a deputy Defence Minister, the Deputy Prosecutor-General and the deputy infrastructure minister.

German Chancellor Olaf Scholz agreed to provide Leopard 2 tanks and allowed other countries to do the same. Ukraine senior officials stated that around 100 Leopard 2 tanks from twelve countries were ready to be transferred to Ukraine.

A missile hit a Turkish-owned cargo ship Tuzla and started a fire while at the Port of Kherson. There were no reported casualties.

External image
- Turkish-owned cargo ship targeted by missiles

=== 25 January ===
The United Nations Educational, Scientific and Cultural Organization (UNESCO) voted to add the historic center of Odesa to its list of World Heritage sites and immediately afterwards, to its list of endangered heritage sites, citing threats caused by the conflict.

The United States was expected to send 31 M1 Abrams tanks to Ukraine and German Chancellor Olaf Scholz agreed to provide 14 Leopard 2A6 tanks to Ukraine. Those tanks, along with the contributions of other nations, totalled around 88 Leopard tanks.

=== 26 January ===
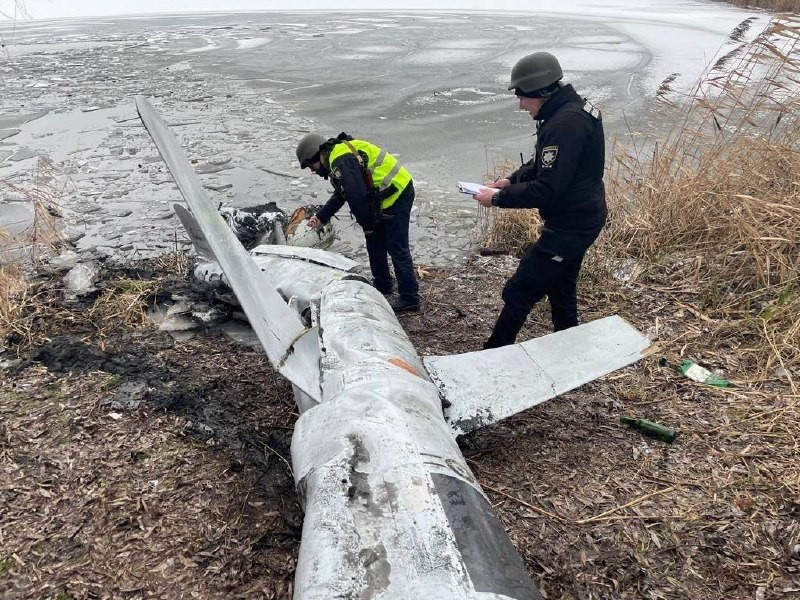
Remains of a Kh-55 found in a lake in the Kyiv region

According to Ukraine, 55 Russian missiles were fired at targets in Ukraine, along with another 24 Shahed-136 drones. The Ukrainian Air Force claimed to have shot down all of the drones and 47 of the missiles. Among the weapons used in the attack was a Kh-47 Kinzhal hypersonic missile. Kyiv's mayor said one person died and two were wounded when an apartment block was hit in the Holosiivskyi District. Across the country, 11 people were killed and 11 more injured, according to the Emergency Service. This was the 13th mass attack since the invasion began.

=== 28 January ===
The Ukrainian Ambassador to France, Vadym Omelchenko, said that Ukraine was promised "321 heavy tanks" without detailing the numbers of tanks from various countries.

Ukrainian forces struck a military hospital in Novoaidar, Luhansk Oblast, with HIMARS rockets. They claimed to have killed several dozen Russian military personnel, while the Russian MoD claimed the strike killed 14 unspecified patients.

=== 30 January ===
The Australian and French governments signed an agreement to jointly supply Ukraine with 155mm shells.

=== 31 January ===
US President Joe Biden said no to sending F-16s fighter jets to Ukraine after being asked by a reporter. A spokesman for British PM Rishi Sunak said it was not practical for the UK to supply Ukraine with fighter jets.

Two US government officials said that the US was preparing a $2 billion aid package to Ukraine which included Ground Launched Small Diameter Bombs with a range of around 150 km (93 mi).

== February 2023 ==
=== 1 February ===
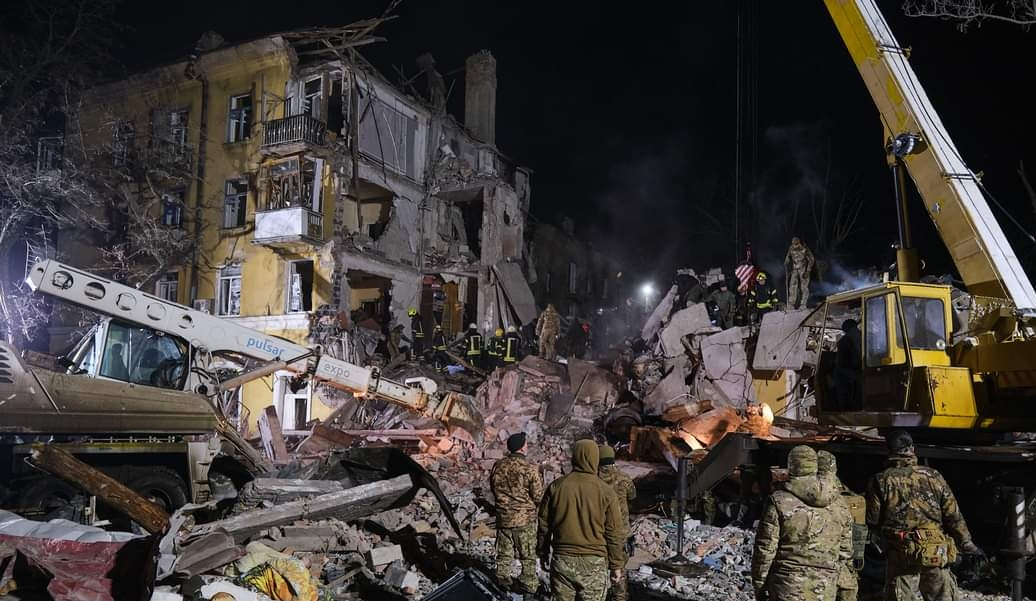
A house in Kramatorsk after a missile strike on 1 February

Law enforcement agencies searched the houses of several former Ukrainian officials in an anti-corruption raid.

PMC Wagner have published a photo claiming a capture of what remained from the depopulated Sakko I Vantsetti village.

=== 2 February ===
According to a South Korean news report, North Korea was planning to send up to 500 military and police personnel to Russian-occupied Donbass after pulling back on a previous plan to send workers.

Police stated that a Russian missile destroyed an apartment building in Kramatorsk, killing at least three people and injuring 20 others. EU officials visited Kyiv.

=== 4 February ===
Ukrainian officials claimed to have done another prisoner swap with Russia, saying that 116 Ukrainian POWs have been returned, including Ukrainian soldiers and guerrillas from occupied territories. Also returned were the bodies of the two deceased British aid workers killed near Soledar, namely Chris Parry, aged 28, and Andrew Bagshaw, aged 47. Russian officials claimed some 63 soldiers were returned. The deal was in part organised by the United Arab Emirates.

=== 5 February ===
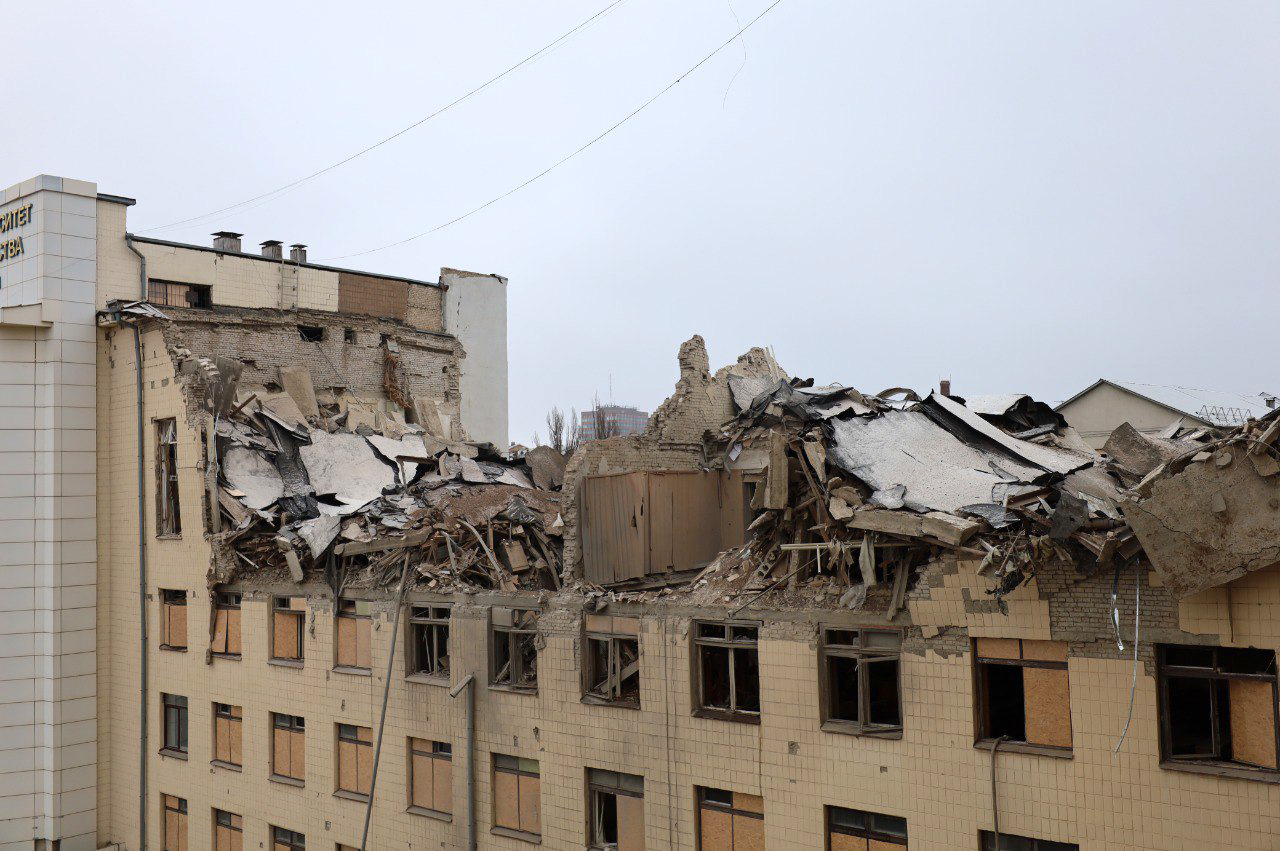
Kharkiv National Academy of Urban Economy after a Russian rocket strike

The Wall Street Journal reported that Russia and Iran plan to build a plant for making improved Shahed 136 drones in Yelabuga, Russia, and make there at least 6,000 drones for the war in Ukraine.

Embargo and price ceilings on Russian oil products, introduced by EU, Australia and G7, came into effect.

Russian shelling and rocket strikes damaged houses and civilian infrastructure in Kherson Oblast, Druzhkivka (Donetsk Oblast) and Kharkiv. In addition, the Kharkiv National Academy of Urban Economy was partially destroyed.

=== 8 February ===
Russian captain, nationalist and founder of the private mercenary group Yenot (raccoon) Igor Mangushev died from a head wound sustained earlier in the month.

=== 9 February ===
In its latest assessment, the Institute for the Study of War said that Russian forces had begun their next major offensive in the west of eastern Luhansk region, most of which is occupied by Russia.

Dmitry Medvedev, member of Russia's security council, visited the Omsk Transport Engineering Plant (a tank factory) and made a statement, promising to "modernize thousands of tanks" and "increase production of modern tanks" in response to Ukraine receiving Western tanks.

Volodymyr Zelenskyy, president of Ukraine, met with the European Council at Brussels and reported that his country intercepted plans by Russian secret services to "destroy" Moldova by a pro-Russian coup. This was also confirmed by Moldovan intelligence.

The Ukrainian military claimed to have destroyed the first BMPT Terminator near Kreminna using artillery.

=== 10 February ===
Seventeen Russian missiles hit Zaporizhzhia in an hour. Other missiles hit Khmelnytskyi, Kharkiv and Dnipropetrovsk regions, targeting the power grid and forcing emergency blackouts.

Valerii Zaluzhnyi said two Kalibr missiles launched from the Black Sea entered Moldovan airspace before re-entering Ukraine. The Defense Ministry of Moldova confirmed that a missile had crossed its airspace, and summoned the Russian ambassador.

The Ukrainian government claimed to have shot down 61 of the 71 cruise missiles that Russian forces fired at Ukrainian targets, using a mixture of Kh-101, Kh-555 and Kalibr missiles; eight Tu-95 bombers were used as well as elements of the Black Sea fleet.

35 countries, including United States, Germany, and Australia, have demanded that Belarus and Russia be banned from the 2024 Paris Olympics due to the war in Ukraine. The IOC suggested that athletes from these countries could compete as "neutrals". Ukraine threatened to boycott the games if Russian athletes were allowed to compete.

Celeste Wallander, United States Assistant Secretary of Defense for International Security Affairs, estimates that Russia had "likely" lost half of its main battle tanks, but was adapting to these losses.

The Zatoka Bridge, in which it crosses the Dniester Estuary, was struck by "marine unmanned drones" according to Russian and Ukrainian media. It was filled with explosives, and footage released showed an explosion. The amount of damage inflicted was not released.

=== 12 February ===
Ukrainian data indicated that Russian soldiers were suffering their highest losses since the first week of the war, at 824 soldiers killed per day in February. The UK Ministry of Defence said that the data was "likely accurate". In June and July around 172 Russian soldiers were killed per day. Ukraine was suffering a high attritional rate as well.

The Wagner Group captured the village of Krasna Hora north of Bakhmut.

The United States embassy in Moscow advised all American citizens to immediately leave Russia due to the ongoing war in Ukraine, citing the "risk of wrongful detentions".

=== 13 February ===
Thomas Bach, head of the IOC, stood by the offer of allowing Russian and Belarusian athletes to participate under a white or neutral flag for the 2024 Paris Olympics, saying that national governments should not decide who can participate in sports competitions.

It was reported that Pakistan had sent some 10,000 Grad rockets to Ukraine in February.

=== 14 February ===
Ukrainian soldiers started training on Leopard 2 tanks in Poland. Norway announced that it would send eight Leopard 2 tanks to Ukraine.

=== 20 February ===
President Biden visited Kyiv, where he promised more military and financial support.

=== 21 February ===
Putin took Russia out of the New START treaty, accusing "the West" of being directly involved in attacking Russia's strategic air bases.

=== 23 February ===
The Russian Ministry of Defense claimed that Ukraine was preparing to invade Transnistria and that Russian soldiers there would respond accordingly. Moldovan authorities pushed back against these claims.

=== 24 February ===
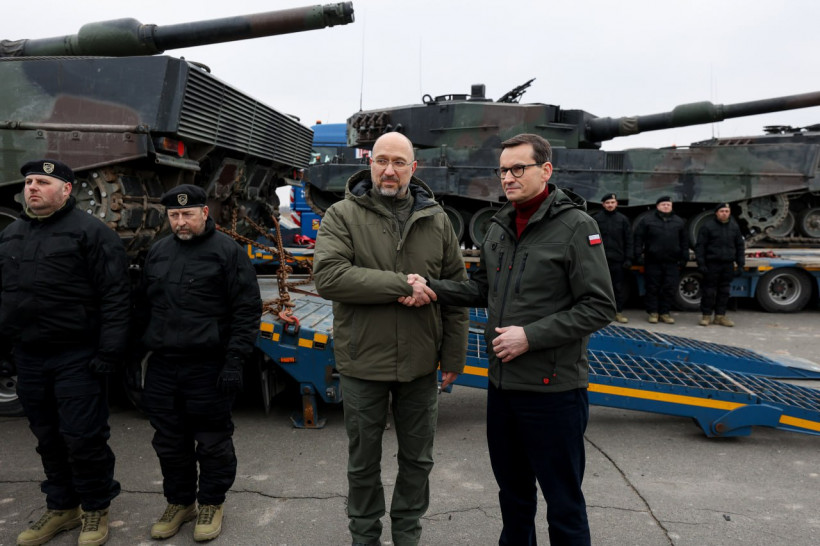
Tanks given by Poland to Ukraine and Prime ministers of both countries

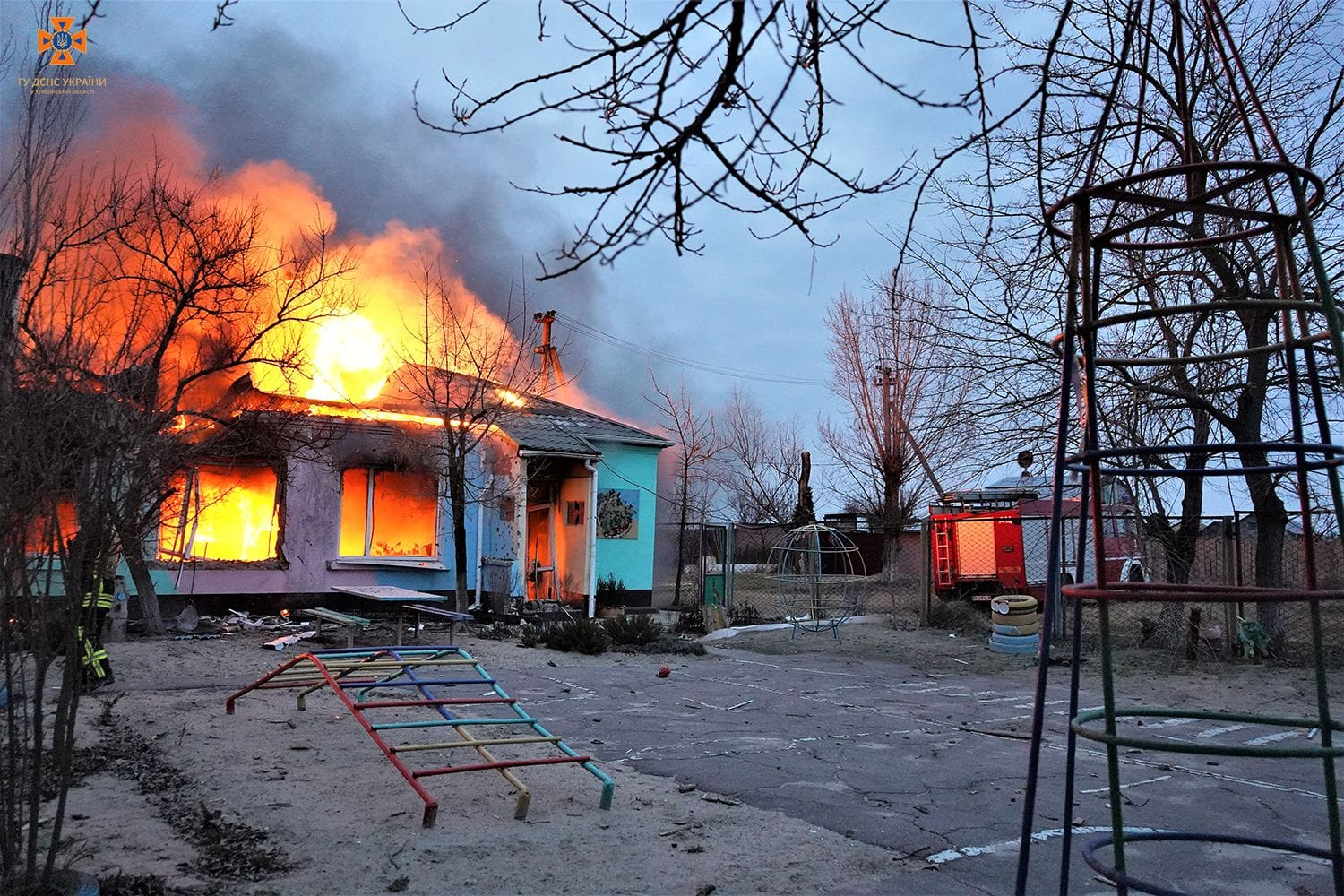
Kindergarten in Kherson after Russian shelling of the city

German-made Leopard tanks from Warsaw arrived in Ukraine as Polish Prime Minister Mateusz Morawiecki visited Kyiv to send a "clear and measurable signal of further support".

The United States authorized $2 billion in aid to Ukraine, and ramped up sanctions and tariffs on Russia. The weapons package announced by the Defense Department included funding for contracts for HIMARS rockets, drones and counter-drone equipment, mine-clearing devices, 155-millimeter artillery ammunition and secure lines of communication.

China proposed a peace plan which involves a ceasefire and multiple other steps that would result in direct negotiations. China holds the stance about "countries' sovereignty, independence and territorial integrity be effectively guaranteed" and that the "cold war mentality" should end. US officials such as President Biden and Secretary of State Antony Blinken expressed doubts about the plan, citing doubts over its neutrality and its failure to condemn the invasion. Zelenskyy stated that it was good that China is talking about Ukraine, but that he would cautiously await details on the plan. It was also speculated by some experts that depending on how this turns out, China could also turn around and start supplying Russia with military equipment.

=== 26 February ===
According to a Russian source, border clashes between Belarus and Ukraine resulted in the death of one Belarusian soldier.

A Russian Beriev A-50U plane at the Machulishchy air base was said to have been destroyed by Belarusian partisans. However, satellite imagery of the Machulishchy air base from 28 February showed the sole A-50 located there still largely intact.

=== 27 February ===
Russia announced the creation of the Bohdan Khmelnytsky Battalion composed mostly of Ukrainian prisoners of war. Sending prisoners of war into a combat zone would be a violation of the Geneva conventions.

== March 2023 ==
=== 1 March ===
Russia repelled a massive drone attack on Crimea but Ukraine denied the attack.

=== 2 March ===
Russian authorities stated that an attack had occurred on two villages near Ukraine, in Bryansk Oblast. Ukraine denied involvement, calling it a provocation.

=== 4 March ===
Ukrainian forces reportedly began their withdrawal from Bakhmut and reports stated that many civilians fled from the city.

Rheinmetall, a German military vehicle and weapons manufacturing company, is reported to be negotiating with the government of Ukraine about the possibility of building a tank factory in Ukraine. The proposed factory would cost about 200 million euros and be capable of producing up to 400 Panther KF51 tanks per year. Armin Papperger, the CEO, reportedly argues that Ukraine would need about 600 to 800 new tanks to win the war, which is more than the 300 existing tanks that Germany could supply them with.

The Ukrainian Defence Minister, Oleksiy Reznikov, wrote a letter to the European Union asking for 250,000 155mm shells per month. Ukrainian forces use approximately 110,000 155mm shells per month. He claimed that Ukrainian forces were only firing a fifth of what they could due to shortages. The Ukrainian hope is to use "594,000" shells per month. NATO is considering establishing factories in Eastern Europe to increase production of Soviet era ammunition.

=== 5 March ===
Two Ukrainian pilots were in the United States to see how long it would take them to learn how to fly attack aircraft including the F-16. Another 10 pilots had been approved for similar testing in the United States but were yet to arrive.

=== 8 March ===
EU ministers of defense agreed to purchase 1 billion euros worth of new artillery shells and provide another 1 billion euros worth of existing materials. Manufacturers needed larger orders to be financially secure enough to build new factories; new orders of artillery ammunition could take 2–3 years if produced using only the current factories.

The US government was considering sending AIM-120 missiles to arm the Ukrainian Air Force's MiG-29 and Su-27.

=== 9 March ===
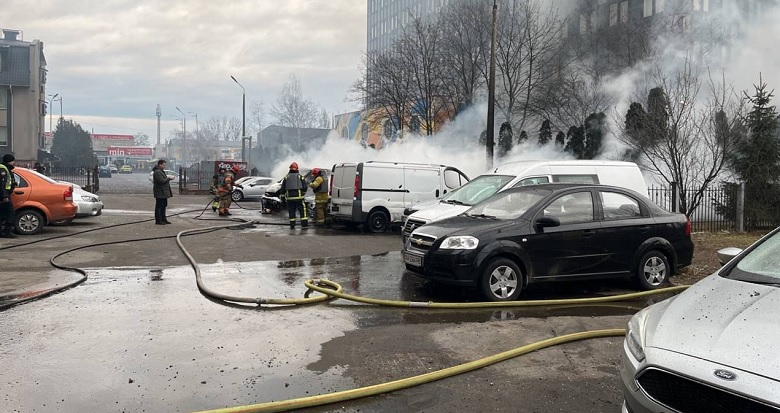
Aftermath of the strikes on Kyiv

Russian launched around 81 missiles, including 6 kinzhal missiles and 8 drones at Ukrainian cities. Ukraine's Military stated it shot down 34 missiles and 4 Shahed drones. Around nine people were killed and blackouts were reported. The Zaporizhzhia Nuclear Power Plant was briefly cut off from the Ukrainian electrical grid, leaving it running on backup diesel generators for the sixth time since Russian forces seized control of it 12 months ago. Russia stated that the attack was response to the 2023 Bryansk Oblast attack.

The Head of Lithuanian military intelligence Elegijus Paulavicius, said in an interview that Russia had the resources to continue the war in Ukraine for at least two years at the "current intensity". He also dismissed the effect of sanctions as Russia had "long chains of intermediaries" to obtain Western technology.

Western officials estimated between 20,000 and 30,000 Russian soldiers had been killed or wounded in the fighting around Bakhmut, while Ukrainian forces have lost about one fifth as many. These numbers could not be verified.

=== 11 March ===
Ukraine and Russia stated that hundreds of troops from each side were killed over 24 hours at Bakhmut.

=== 13 March ===
Norway announced that it will provide two NASAMS missile systems to Ukraine.

=== 15 March ===
Ukroboronprom, with the help of a "NATO country", started manufacturing 125 mm smoothbore ammunition for Ukraine's Soviet-era tanks. Also being manufactured were 120 mm mortar rounds, 122 mm and 152 mm artillery shells. The production of projectiles is completely dispersed over a large number of cities. This is part of a larger effort by Ukraine to manufacture ammunition as Western donors have reached into their own stockpiles.

Sébastien Lecornu, Minister of Armed Forces for France, announced that AMX-10 RC armored fighting vehicles have arrived in Ukraine.

=== 16 March ===
Poland announced that it will provide four MiG-29s to Ukraine with in the next few days. The rest of Poland's MiG-29 fleet is being serviced to also be ready for transfer at a later time. The total number to be sent is unclear with different sources speculating from 11 to 19.

=== 17 March ===
Slovakia decided to provide Ukraine with 13 MiG-29 jets in varying states of readiness.

The International Criminal Court issued an arrest warrant against Russian President Vladimir Putin and his Commissioner for Children's Rights Maria Lvova-Belova for allegations of war crimes during the war in Ukraine. Later in March, the Hungarian Prime Minister's chief of staff, Gergely Gulyás, said that Hungary would not arrest Putin if he entered the country, stating that the warrant was inconsistent with Hungarian law.

=== 18 March ===
President Putin visited Crimea on the ninth anniversary of the peninsula's annexation.

The Black Sea Grain Initiative between Ukraine and Russia, which was due to expire on 18 March, was extended.

=== 19 March ===
President Putin toured Mariupol after travelling there from Crimea via helicopter.

=== 20 March ===
The European Union announced that it will be sending a million rounds of shells to Ukraine over the next 12 months.

The United States approved a $350 million military aid package for Ukraine. The package includes ammunition for HIMARS rocket launchers, ammunition for Bradley Fighting Vehicles, HARM missiles, anti-tank weapons, riverine boats, and other equipment.

=== 21 March ===
Explosions were reported to have occurred at the city of Dzhankoi, Crimea. The local Russian administrator, Ihor Ivin, said that a 33-year-old man was taken to hospital due to shrapnel from a downed drone. The power grid was damaged and several buildings caught fire. The Ukrainian Defence Ministry said the explosions "...destroyed Russian Kalibr-KN cruise missiles as they were being transported by rail". The ministry added that the missiles were supposedly destined for submarine launch by the Russian Black Sea fleet, but Ukraine did not explicitly claim responsibility for the explosions.

Japanese Prime Minister Fumio Kishida met with President Zelenskyy in Kyiv.

In an effort to speed up delivery, the US government said it would supply Ukraine with older M1A1 Abrams tanks that have been upgraded so that they offer a "very similar capability to the M1A2" rather than the newer M1A2 tanks. In addition, the UK government also said it would supply Ukraine with depleted uranium shells.

=== 22 March ===
Zelenskyy visited Ukrainian troops fighting in Bakhmut and handed out medals to wounded soldiers.

Russia started moving their T-54/55 tanks from a reserve base. These tanks were from the late 1940s and were the oldest tanks still kept in reserve. It is believed by observers that these were likely being moved to the front.

=== 23 March ===
Dmitry Medvedev, former president of Russia and current deputy chairman of Russia's security council, threatened war against any country, if their officials attempted to arrest Putin on the ICC warrant, during a future state visit. He also described the ICC as a "legal nonentity that had never done anything significant". He also threatened that Russia would in that case possibly attack the International Criminal Court with hypersonic missiles that would be launched from a ship in the North Sea. Medvedev also reaffirmed his previous warnings that the chance of nuclear war increases each time the western nations send military aid to Ukraine.

Sweden approved 6.2 billion kronor worth of military aid to Ukraine which included vehicles and ammunition.

=== 24 March ===
A representative of the Indian Air Force told the Indian parliament that a "major delivery" from Russia was not going to proceed due to the war with Ukraine. This was the first time that a government officially acknowledged shortcomings by Russia to supply weapons or components due to the ongoing war in Ukraine.

=== 25 March ===
Ukrainian commander-in-chief Valerii Zaluzhnyi posted on Facebook that Ukrainian forces in Bakhmut had managed to "stabilize the situation".

President Putin said Russia would go ahead with its plan to station tactical nuclear weapons in Belarus. He also stated that a small number of Iskander missiles able to carry them were already in Belarus. A storage facility for tactical nuclear weapons is to be finished by 1 July.

=== 28 March ===
German Minister of Defence Boris Pistorius stated that 18 Leopard 2A6 tanks had arrived in Ukraine. Ukrainian Defence spokeswoman Iryna Zolotar confirmed the arrival of British Challenger 2 tanks.

=== 29 March ===
The head of the IAEA, Rafael Grossi, visited the Zaporizhzhia NPP to check on the status of the plant amid increased fighting in the region.

=== 30 March ===
Wall Street Journal reporter Evan Gershkovich was arrested in Russia for spying by the Federal Security Service, near the Ural Mountains city of Yekaterinburg. He covered the invasion of Ukraine and the impact on Russian economy of international sanctions. In May, the FSB extended his pre-trial detention until 30 August.

=== 31 March ===
The International Monetary Fund approved a $15.6 billion support package for Ukraine to assist with the country's economic recovery. The package would be the first of its kind for a country at war. The World Bank estimated that around US$411 billion was needed for Ukraine's recovery and for rebuilding from the invasion.

== April 2023 ==
=== 1 April ===
A court in Kyiv ordered the house arrest of Metropolitan Pavlo (born Petro Lebid) of the Ukrainian Orthodox Church (Moscow Patriarchate) for allegedly supporting the Russian invasion of Ukraine. He was later taken under police custody on 14 July.

Russia assumed the presidency of the UN Security Council for the month, a role in which Russia was able to maneuver meetings on Ukraine to portray the US and other Western countries as making false accusations against Russia.

=== 2 April ===
Russian military blogger Vladlen Tatarsky was killed by an explosion in a cafe in St Petersburg. The explosion injured around 24 people of which 6 were in critical condition. The cafe where the explosion occurred belongs to Yevgeny Prigozhin.

Armenia said that it won't arrest Putin despite the country trying to join the International Criminal Court. This is after the Kremlin threatened "serious negative consequences" and the banning of Armenian dairy products. The Deputy Speaker of the Armenian Parliament Hakob Arshakyan said: "The decision of the constitutional court does not find anyone guilty in any matter and does not require steps to arrest anyone...We have heard concerns expressed by the Russian Federation."

=== 3 April ===
Polish presidential aide Marcin Przydacz stated that Poland transferred some MiG-29 fighter jets to Ukraine. Poland had pledged to deliver 4 jets in the first batch.

Secretary General of NATO, Jens Stoltenberg, announced that Finland was set to join NATO on 4 April. Stoltenberg also stated that he was confident that Sweden will also join NATO in the near future.

=== 4 April ===
The United States government announced a $2.6 billion (USD) aid package to Ukraine which includes ammunition for HIMARS, air defense interceptors, artillery rounds, small arms ammunition, and anti-drone systems.

=== 5 April ===
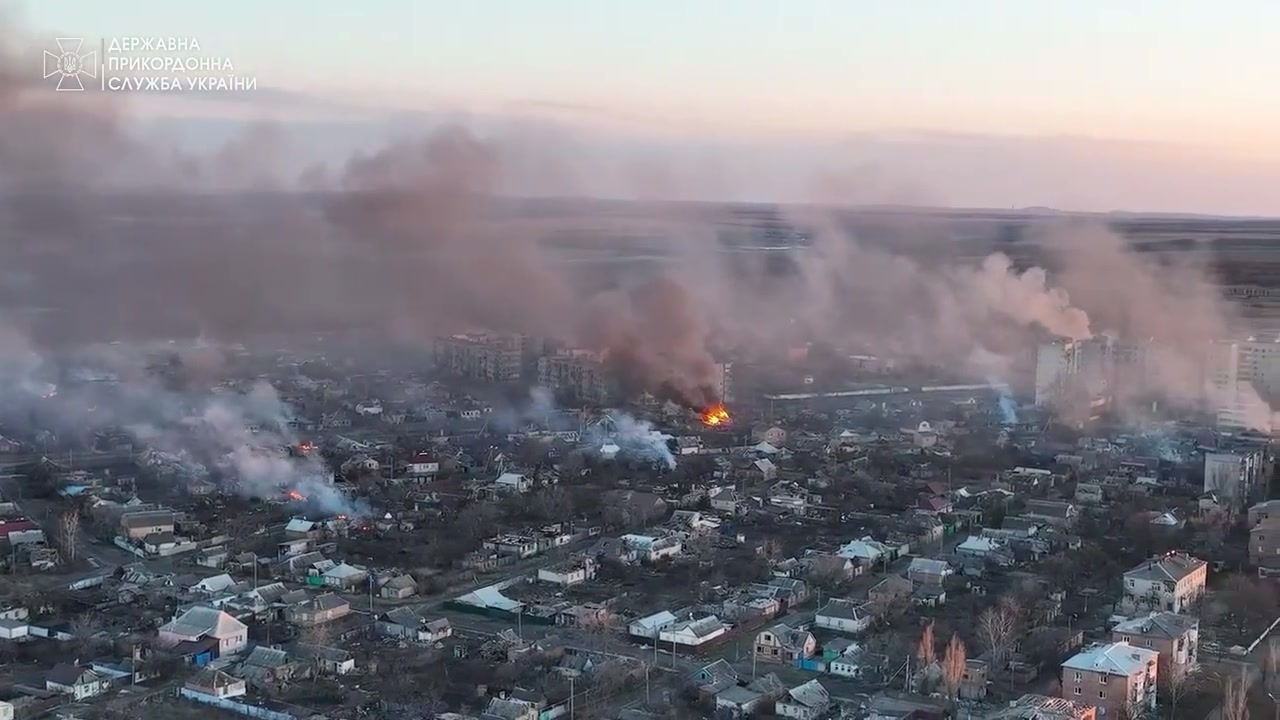
View of southwest Bakhmut during the battle of Bakhmut, April 2023

Spain's Defence Minister, Margarita Robles, announced that Spain would send six Leopard 2A4s to Ukraine in the second half of April.

=== 6 April ===
Fu Cong, China's Ambassador to the European Union, explained in interviews that the recently declared "friendship with no limits" between Russia and China is actually "nothing but rhetoric" and that China will continue to not recognize Crimea as a part of Russia. In another interview, he denied China having any plans to provide Russia with weapons. This was something that U.S. officials have accused China of preparing. He is also reported to have stated that what is most urgent for China is "to stop the fighting to save lives".

Ukroboronprom announced that it would launch joint manufacture of 125mm tank rounds for Soviet era tanks with Polska Grupa Zbrojeniowa. Ukroboronprom stated that Poland will be the second NATO country to help Ukraine manufacture Soviet-era shells.

Classified documents of US–NATO counter-offensive plan details were leaked from the Pentagon via social media sites. According to experts, the plans have been edited prior to publication to decrease estimates of Russian losses and increase estimates of Ukrainian losses. Some of the experts have questioned the authenticity of the documents and suggested that the leak could be part of a Russian disinformation campaign.

=== 7 April ===
An Iraqi national, identified as Abbas Abuthar Witwit, died in a hospital in Luhansk due to injuries sustained while fighting as a member of the Wagner Group in Bakhmut the previous day, in what is believed to be the first confirmed case of a Middle East native to have died fighting in the war. His death was confirmed by Wagner's head Yevgeny Prigozhin, who said he had been recruited from a Russian jail, on 1 June.

=== 9 April ===
Ukraine started electricity exports for the first time since six months after the invasion. Energy exports had been stopped due to multiple strikes on the electrical infrastructure. Ukrainian Energy Minister Herman Halushchenko stated that the electrical system had been producing extra capacity for almost two months.

=== 10 April ===
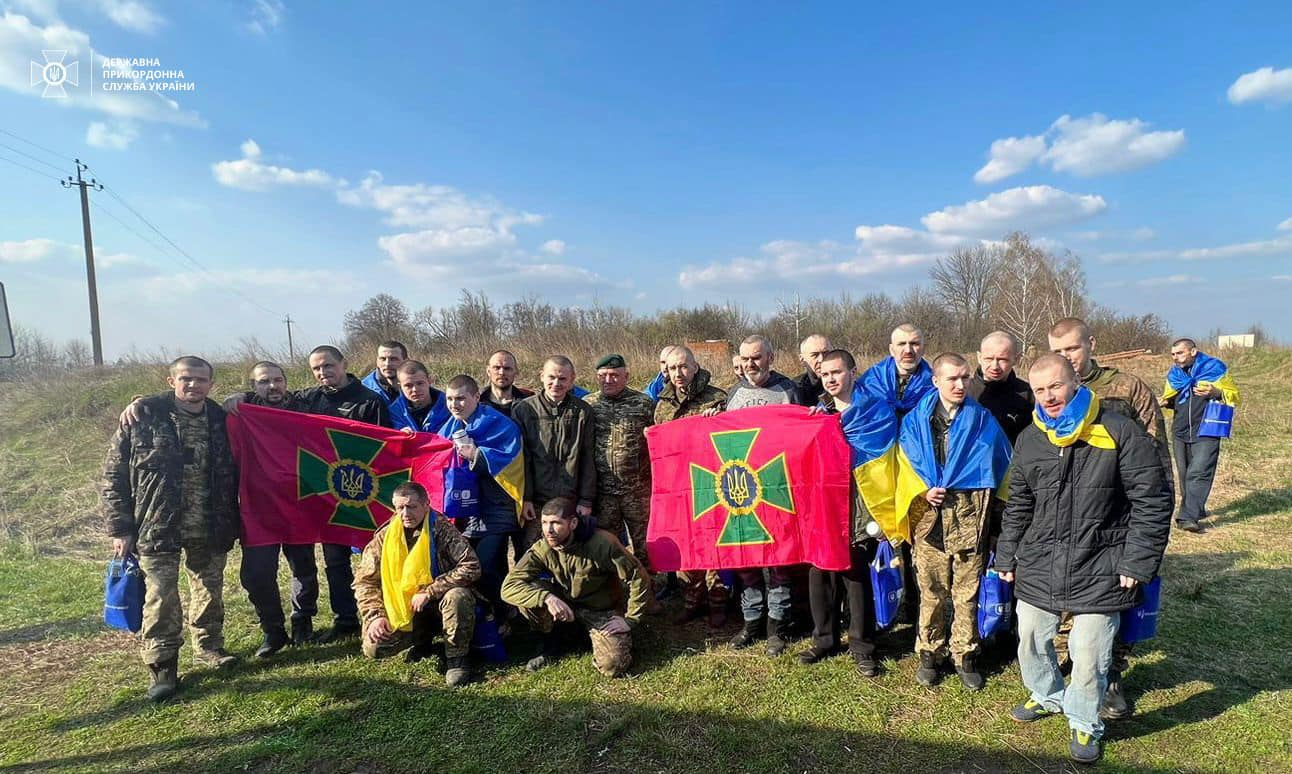
Ukrainian soldiers released during the 10 April 2023 prisoner exchange

Ukraine and Russia swapped prisoners: around 106 Russian soldiers and 100 Ukrainian soldiers, some of whom needed medical attention.

=== 11 April ===
Denmark's Acting Defence Minister, Troels Lund Poulsen, stated that Denmark will provide Ukraine with Leopard 1A5 tanks before summer, and hopes to provide as many as 100 within six months.

The Russian State Duma passed legislation to change the nature of conscription summons and how they were served. Previously a summons had to be physically served on the person being called up. Now a summons is deemed to be served once it appears on the government services portal called "Gosuslugi". Failure to obey such a summons could mean potential "bans on driving, registering a company, working as a self-employed individual, obtaining credit or loans, selling apartments, buying property or securing social benefits."

=== 12 April ===
A video, which seems to have been shot recently, was released online depicting the beheaded corpses of two Ukrainian soldiers. Another video, released on 11 April, shows the beheading of a Ukrainian prisoner of war, believed to have happened in summer 2022. The Ukrainian President condemned the actions. Kremlin spokesman Dmitry Peskov said the authenticity of the videos remained to be verified.

=== 13 April ===
The BBC reported that the UK plans to send a third Westland Sea King helicopter to Ukraine in the "coming weeks", with the Ukrainian crew being trained in its maintenance at a base in "southern England".

=== 14 April ===
An apartment block in Sloviansk was shelled by Russian forces, killing nine people, including a two-year-old boy. The death toll was later updated to 15, plus 24 persons wounded.

=== 15 April ===
Poland and Hungary banned imports of grain and some other food from Ukraine "to protect the local agricultural sector", due to Ukrainian supplies lowering the price of food. The bans were criticized by the Ukrainian Ministry of Agrarian Policy as contradicting bilateral agreements on exports, while the European Commission said that "unilateral actions are not acceptable". Jarosław Kaczyński, the leader of the Polish Law and Justice party, said that Poland will continue supporting Ukraine and that it was ready to start talks to settle the issue.

=== 16 April ===
Ukraine and Russia conducted an Orthodox Easter prisoner swap. Some one hundred and thirty Ukrainian POWs were returned to Ukraine in exchange for an unknown number of Russian soldiers. Ukrainian officials said that the remains of some eighty-two deceased Ukrainian soldiers were retrieved from territory controlled by Russia.

Chinese defense minister Li Shangfu met with Putin amid reports of Ukrainian forces finding an increasing number of Chinese components in Russian weapons, and leaked classified documents from the United States about China's alleged plans to covertly supply Russia with weapons.

=== 17 April ===
Russian opposition activist Vladimir Kara-Murza was sentenced to twenty-five years imprisonment for treason and discrediting the Russian military.

Slovakia banned the import of grain from Ukraine, following a similar decision by Poland and Hungary on 15 April.

Russian President Vladimir Putin visited military commanders in the Russian-occupied part of the Kherson Oblast and troops in Luhansk. In Luhansk he gave soldiers "copies of icons as a gift" for Russian Orthodox Easter which was 16 April. Although Kremlin spokesman Dmitry Peskov said the visit was 17 April, President Putin was heard saying Easter is "coming up". Subsequently, this was edited from the footage of the visit.

While Ukrainian forces were training in Europe a Leopard 2A4 was damaged, with the turret being completely dislodged from the hull. The crew were reported as being fine. The accident was believed to be due to crew error or the age of the tank.

Slovakia finished its delivery of 13 MiG-29 fighter jets to Ukraine.

=== 18 April ===
A German government website announced that the country had delivered a Patriot missile system to Ukraine. The United States is yet to confirm if the Patriot system it promised to Ukraine has been delivered.

The Ukrainian Interior Ministry announced that it had created an online database of Russian and pro-Russian-separatist soldiers killed in Ukraine. Currently, it identified by name 56,827 "Russian representatives" killed in Ukraine, as well as their place and date of death.

=== 19 April ===
South Korean President Yoon Suk-yeol, announced that they would send military aid to Ukraine, if Russia carries out any more large-scale attacks against civilians in Ukraine. Dmitry Medvedev, Deputy Secretary of the Security Council of Russia and former Russian President, responded by saying that if South Korea were to send military aid to Ukraine, Russia would respond by sending military aid to the Democratic People's Republic of Korea on a "...quid pro quo" basis. President Yoon drew comparisons between the war in Ukraine and the Korea War of 1950–53 and how the international community supported South Korea.

Several foreign volunteers were killed by Russian forces in Bakhmut, including: Dmitry Petrov from Russia; Finbar Cafferkey from Ireland; and Cooper “Harris” Andrews from the United States. The death of Cafferkey caused a strain in Ireland–Russia relations.

=== 20 April ===
A Russian Su-34 over Belgorod suffered an accidental or emergency release of an "air ordnance", leaving a 20-meter crater in the city centre with three people slightly wounded.

=== 21 April ===
Jens Stoltenberg, secretary general of NATO, said that "All NATO allies have agreed that Ukraine will become a member," once the war with Russia was over. German Defence Minister Boris Pistorius had previously said that it was not yet time to decide Ukraine's membership.

A Moscow court ordered an arrest warrant, "in absentia", for Maj. Gen. Kyrylo Budanov, the head of the Main Directorate of Intelligence (Ukraine) over the Crimean Bridge explosion.

=== 22 April ===
An unexploded bomb was discovered in Belgorod, forcing the evacuation of more than three thousand people from seventeen apartment buildings in the surrounding area. The bomb was removed according to Vyacheslav Gladkov, the local governor. This was the same area where a bomb from an Su-34 was dropped on 20 April.

=== 23 April ===
An analysis based on images posted by pro-Kremlin military bloggers suggests that Ukrainian military forces have established positions on the east bank of the Dnieper River, along with stable supply lines to their positions.

=== 24 April ===
Russian forces stopped an attack on the Black Sea Fleet base at Sevastopol. The Russian defence ministry said that "three unmanned high-speed boats" were destroyed. Ukraine did not comment on the attack.

=== 25 April ===
According to RIA Novosti, T-14 Armata tanks were used to fire indirectly on Ukrainian positions but were yet to be deployed in "direct assault operations". The tanks were given extra protection and the crews underwent "combat coordination".

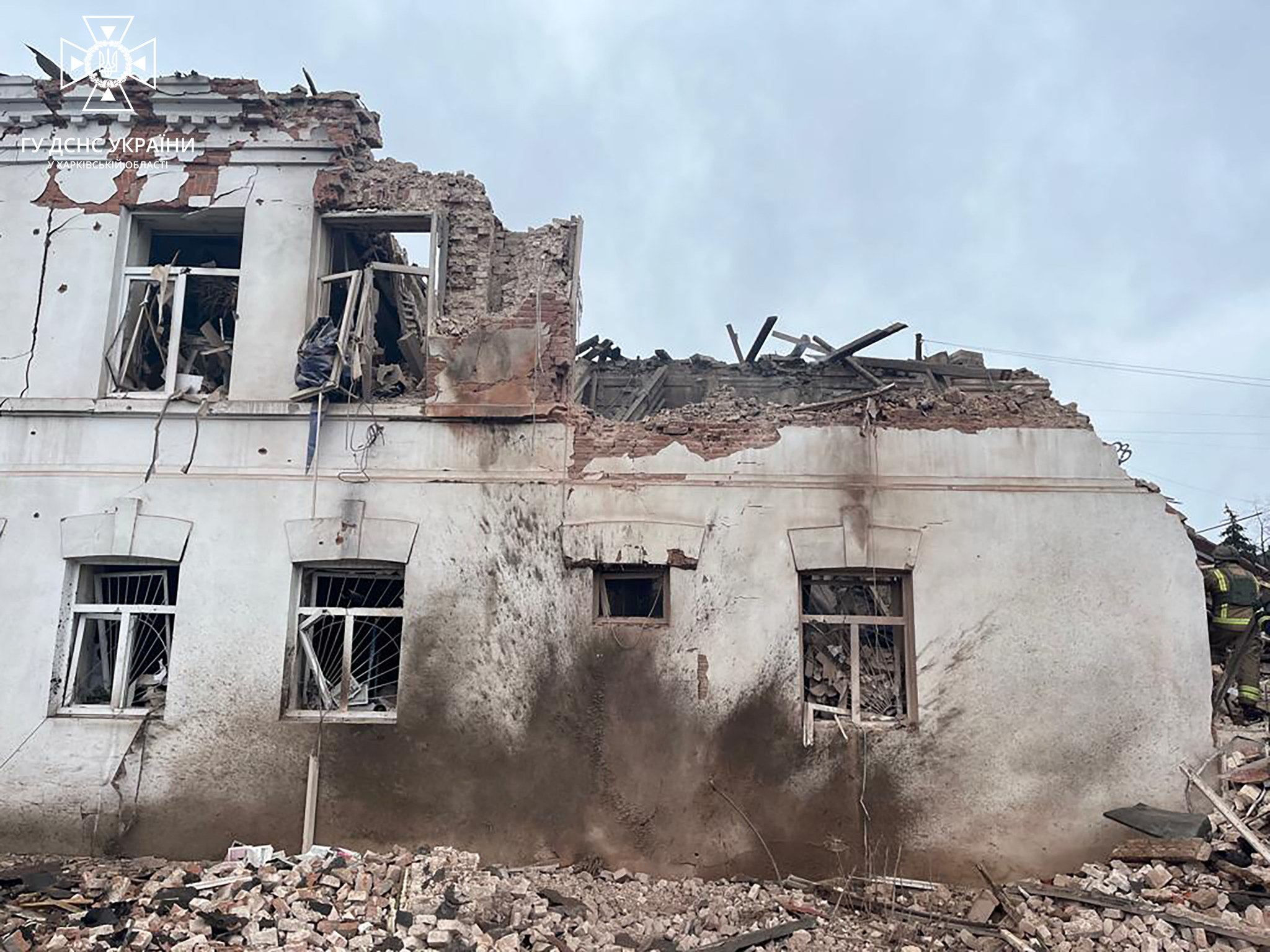
Local history museum of Kupiansk after a strike on 25 April

A Russian S-300 missile hit a museum in Kupiansk, Kharkiv Oblast, killing two people and wounding ten others.

Natalia Humeniuk, the spokeswoman for Ukraine's Southern Defense Forces, stated that they had destroyed between 13 and 20 pieces of Russian military equipment on the left (east) bank of the Dnipro River each day over the last three days, and had inflicted heavy losses on the enemy.

=== 26 April ===
Yevgeny Roizman, former mayor of Yekaterinburg and opposition politician, went on trial for discrediting the Russian army over the war in Ukraine. He pled not guilty to the charge, which carries a five-year jail term.

President of Ukraine Volodymyr Zelenskyy held the first phone call with Xi Jinping since the beginning of the Russian invasion of Ukraine. After the call, Zelenskyy appointed a new ambassador to China, Pavlo Riabikin. Xi Jinping pledged to send a peace talks delegation to Ukraine.

=== 27 April ===
A Moscow court fined the Wikimedia Foundation, the hosting platform for Wikipedia, two million roubles. This is the seventh fine since 2023 by a Russian court. The latest fine was for a failure to remove an article from Wikipedia that contains "classified military information" about the war in Ukraine. Russian digital affairs minister Maksut Shadaev told Interfax "We are not blocking Wikipedia yet, there are no such plans for now."

Jens Stoltenberg, Secretary General of NATO, announced that since the start of the war NATO had provided Ukraine with anti-aircraft weapon systems, some MiG-29 aircraft, 230 tanks and 1550 other armored vehicles, which makes up 98% of the previously promised aid in armored vehicles. He said that NATO had trained enough Ukrainians to assemble 9 new armored brigades, which put Ukraine in a strong position to recapture occupied territories.

Melitopol's chief of police, Oleksandr Mishchenko, was killed by an Improvised explosive device. He had been collaborating with the Russian forces since they captured the city. Another police officer was killed and one more wounded. The attack was blamed on Ukrainian partisans.

It was reported that a military projectile had been discovered in a forest close to the village of Zamosc near Bydgoszcz, Poland. It was later identified as a Russian Kh-55 missile.

According to Finnish Foreign Minister Pekka Haavisto, the Russian Central Bank had frozen the bank accounts of the Finnish Embassy in Moscow and the Finnish consulate in Saint Petersburg. Accounts belonging to Danish diplomatic offices were also frozen. Russian Foreign Minister Sergei Lavrov later said that it was in retaliation for the what it called the unfriendly acts of "the collective West".

=== 28 April ===
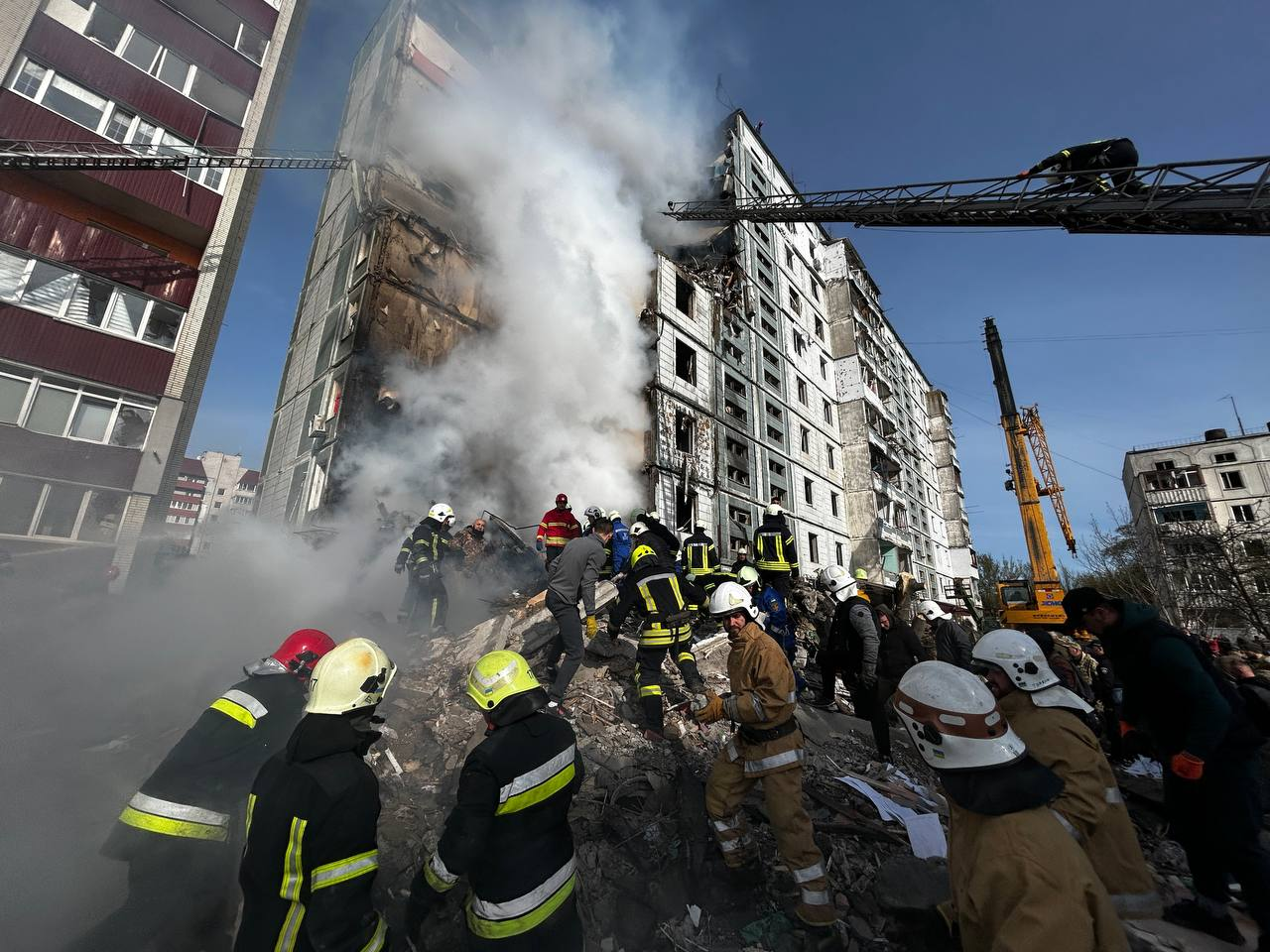
Destroyed apartment building in Uman

Russia launched airstrikes on multiple cities including Kyiv, Dnipro, Kremenchuk, Poltava, Mykolaiv and Uman. At least two missiles hit a nine-story apartment building in Uman killing at least 23 people, and in addition seventeen people were wounded. Two other people were killed in Dnipro. Twenty-one out of the twenty-three missiles were intercepted, as were two "attack drones".

Ukrainian Defence Minister Oleksii Reznikov has said that the Ukrainian counteroffensive was "largely ready" to go ahead, subject to weather conditions and approval of commanders.

=== 29 April ===
The Moscow-installed governor of Crimea, Sergei Aksyonov, blamed Ukrainian drones for a strike on a fuel storage facility in Sevastopol. According to the governor, two drones were shot down by air defence and electronic warfare systems. A Ukrainian intelligence spokesperson, Andriy Yusov, told Ukrainian media that "10 tanks of oil products", with 40,000 tons of fuel, were destroyed; called it divine retribution for those killed in Russian air strikes in Uman the previous day.

=== 30 April ===
The governor of Bryansk Oblast in Russia, Alexander Bogomaz, claimed that Ukrainian shelling hit the village of Suzemka, killing four civilians.

== May 2023 ==
=== 1 May ===
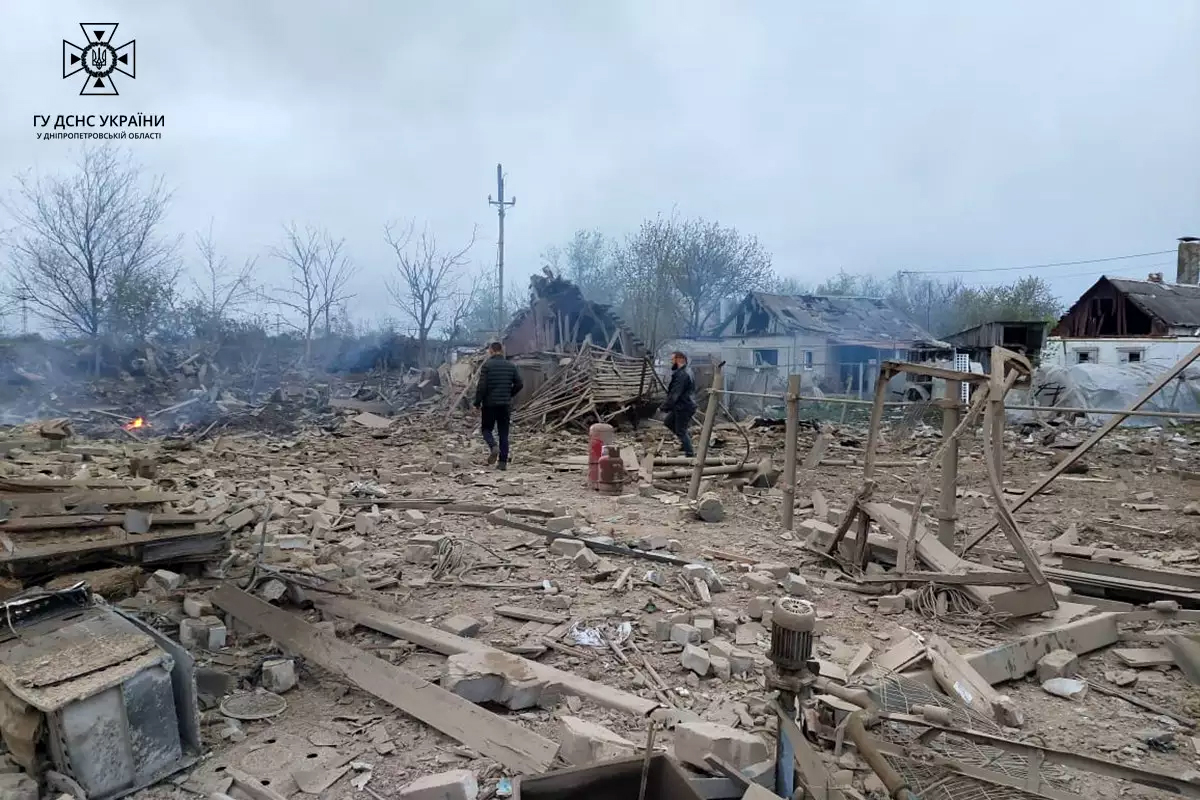
Destruction in Pavlohrad

Russian missiles struck Pavlohrad, destroying "dozens" of houses, other buildings and wounding thirty four. Kyiv also came under attack, however no damage or losses were reported. Ukraine claimed to have shot down fifteen of the eighteen missiles fired. Pavlohrad was a logistical and railway hub with a Russian-installed official, Vladimir Rogov, claiming that the attacks were aimed at railway infrastructure and fuel depots in the city. Russian shelling in Kherson killed one person.

Russia announced the removal of Col. Gen. Mikhail Mizintsev from his post as deputy defence minister in charge of logistics.

In Russia's Bryansk Oblast, bordering Ukraine, a freight train derailed after an explosive device detonated along the Bryansk-Unecha railway line.

U.S. National Security Council spokesman John Kirby, said that the US estimated that the Russians had suffered 100,000 casualties, including over 20,000 dead, during the Battle of Bakhmut alone since December 2022. He also stated that half of these losses were from the Wagner Group.

Yevgeny Prigozhin, head of Wagner PMC, said that his forces were only getting a third of ammunition they needed.

=== 2 May ===
Russian Defence Minister Sergei Shoigu said that Russian success in Ukraine would "largely depend on the timely replenishment of weapons". He said that the Russian army had the weapons that it needed for 2023, nevertheless he asked a rocket producer to double its manufacture of precision missiles.

=== 3 May ===
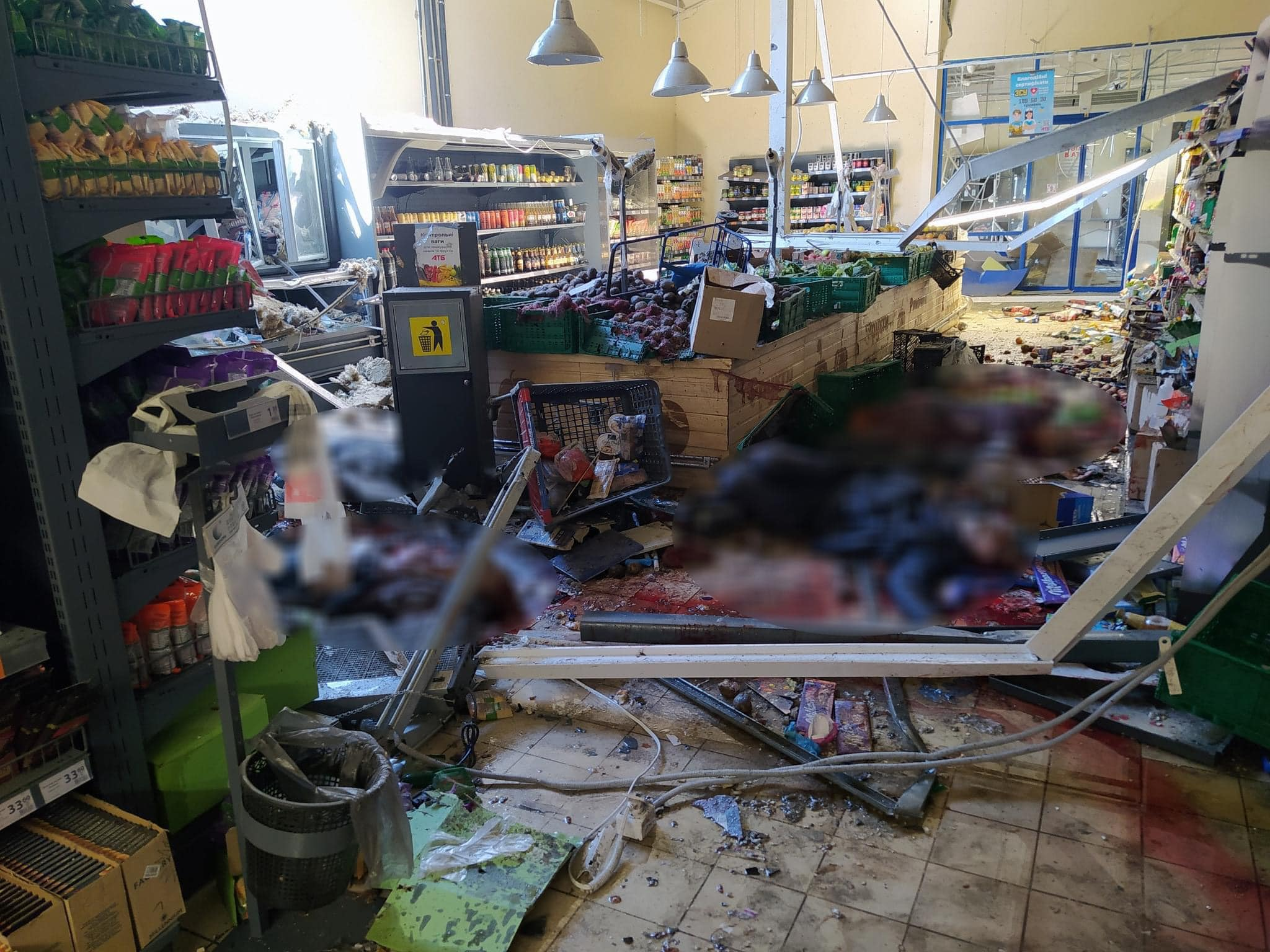
Shelled shop in Kherson

A 58-hour curfew was announced in Kherson. Oleksandr Prokudin, the Ukrainian governor of Kherson Oblast, said that during the curfew: "it is forbidden to move on the streets of the city. The city will also be closed for entry and exit". Twenty-four civilians were killed in Kherson city due to Russian shelling.

Russia said it had shot down two drones over the Moscow Kremlin and accused Ukraine of sending them to assassinate President Vladimir Putin. The Institute for the Study of War commented that it was "extremely unlikely that two drones could have penetrated multiple layers of air defence and detonated or been shot down just over the heart of the Kremlin in a way that provided spectacular imagery caught nicely on camera". The Ukrainian government denied the accusations, calling them fabricated.

The British Ministry of Defence reported that several unmanned aerial vehicles (UAVs) struck Russia's Seshcha Airbase in Bryansk Oblast, 150 km north of the Ukrainian border, adding that an An-124 heavy transport aircraft was likely damaged.

=== 4 May ===
Explosions were reported in Kyiv and Odesa in another series of Russian air attacks. Ukraine claimed to have destroyed 18 out of the 24 drones launched, plus a reconnaissance drone, with only light damage to property; the drones were marked with messages such as "For Moscow" and "For the Kremlin".

According to TASS, Ukrainian drones attacked and set ablaze the Ilsky refinery near Novorossiisk. The fire was extinguished without damage after two hours.

Fighting broke out between Russian and Ukrainian delegates to the Parliamentary Assembly of the Black Sea Economic Cooperation in Ankara, Turkey. Ukrainian delegates had earlier waved Ukrainian flags during a speech by a Russian delegate. Later, Oleksandr Marikovski, a Ukrainian MP, physically assaulted a Russian official after the latter seized his flag.

Ukraine for the first time intercepted a Russian Kh-47M2 Kinzhal hypersonic missile, following reports from Kyiv of a powerful explosion overnight. The Ukrainian Air Force said they shot it down using the Patriot missile system protecting the capital.

=== 5 May ===
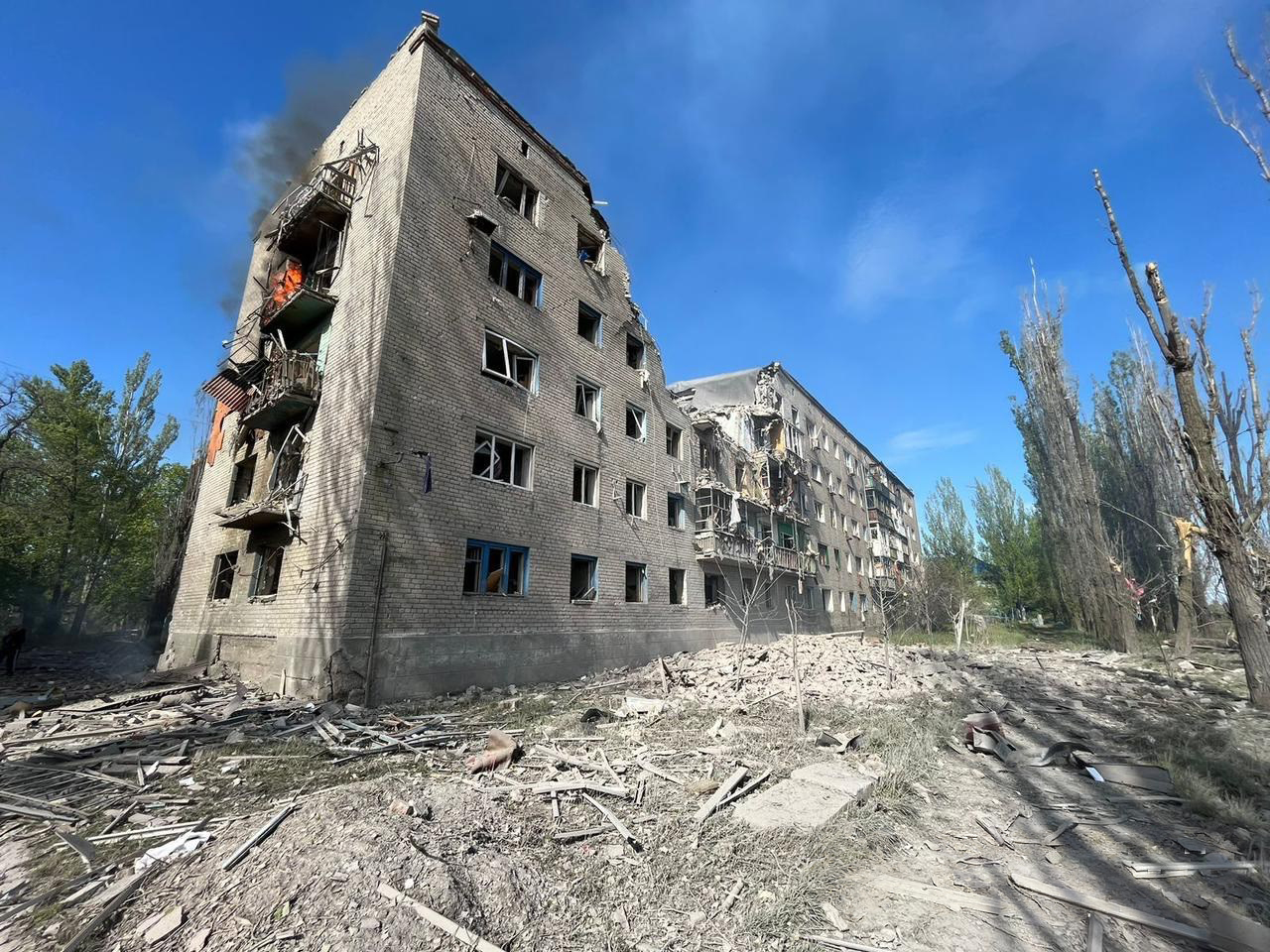
A bombed residential building in Avdiivka

The head of the Wagner Group, Yevgeny Prigozhin, said that he would withdraw his troops from Bakhmut after Russia's Victory Day on 10 May because of ammunition shortages, blaming the Russian military establishment. However, two days later he said he had "received a combat order" and had been promised all ammunition and weapons needed.

Russia ordered a partial evacuation of civilians from 18 settlements of Zaporizhzhia Oblast near the Zaporizhzhia Nuclear Power Plant, including Enerhodar, citing increased shelling by the Ukrainian military.

A Polish border guard aircraft on patrol for the European Union's border agency Frontex figured in a near-collision with a Russian Su-35 fighter jet in international waters over the Black Sea near Romania. A Polish official said that the Russian jet carried out "aggressive and dangerous manoeuvres" approaching the Polish aircraft without keeping a secure distance, leading to turbulence, loss of altitude and a temporary loss of control of the plane by the crew.

Belarus implemented border controls with Russia for the first time since 1995, in what Foreign Minister Sergei Aleinik later said was part of efforts to avoid the entry of third-country nationals into the country but was seen by human rights organizations as an attempt to stem the escape of Russian dissidents and draft evaders.

=== 6 May ===
A bomb detonated in the Audi Q7 of Russian ultranationalist writer Zakhar Prilepin in Nizhniy Novgorod Oblast, injuring him and killing his driver. Russian Foreign Ministry spokesperson Maria Zakharova blamed Ukraine, the United States and NATO for the attack; a suspect was detained, and the partisan group Atesh claimed responsibility.

Ukraine accused Russia of using white phosphorus munitions near civilian infrastructure in Bakhmut, and said that Wagner forces were reinforcing positions in Bakhmut in a probable attempt to try and seize the city before Russian Victory Day celebrations on May 9.

=== 7 May ===
Mikhail Razvozhayev, the Russian-installed governor of Crimea, claimed that Russian forces stopped a Ukrainian drone attack using air defence and electronic warfare, downing three of the drones without property damage or casualties.

=== 8 May ===
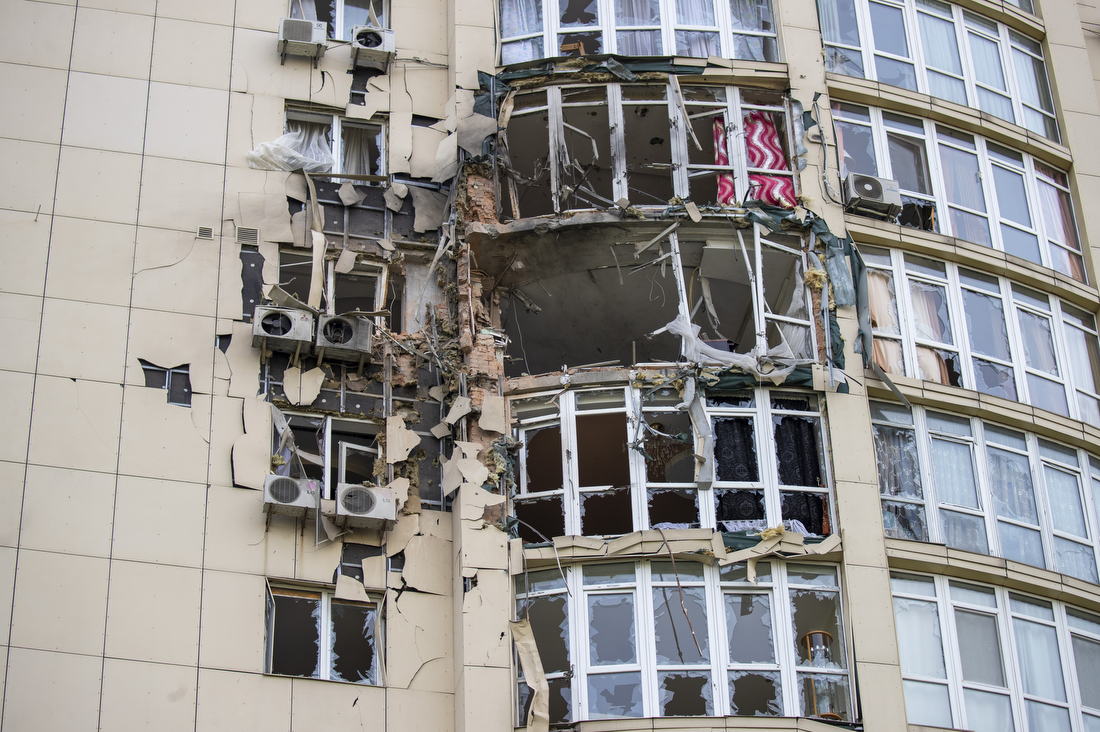
Residential building in Kyiv damaged by downed drone

The Ukrainian General Staff said that Russia launched sixteen missiles and thirty five Shahed drones at Kyiv and other cities in Ukraine, injuring five people in Kyiv. Ukraine claimed to have shot down all drones. Other attacks occurred in the Kharkiv, Kherson, Mykolaiv and Odesa regions. Rocket fire was also reported along with airstrikes. Ukrainian Air Force spokesperson Colonel Yurii Ihnat said that there were "seven aircraft and up to eight launches of Kh-22 cruise missiles" at Odesa Oblast. Many of the missiles were believed to have self-destructed due to their age. One missile was believed to have hit a food storage warehouse in Odesa starting a fire. The missiles were fired from Tu-22 bombers. The attacks occurred on the eve of celebrations of Victory Day in Russia on 9 May.

Russia again blocked grain exports from Ukraine, putting about 90 ships in waiting.

=== 9 May ===
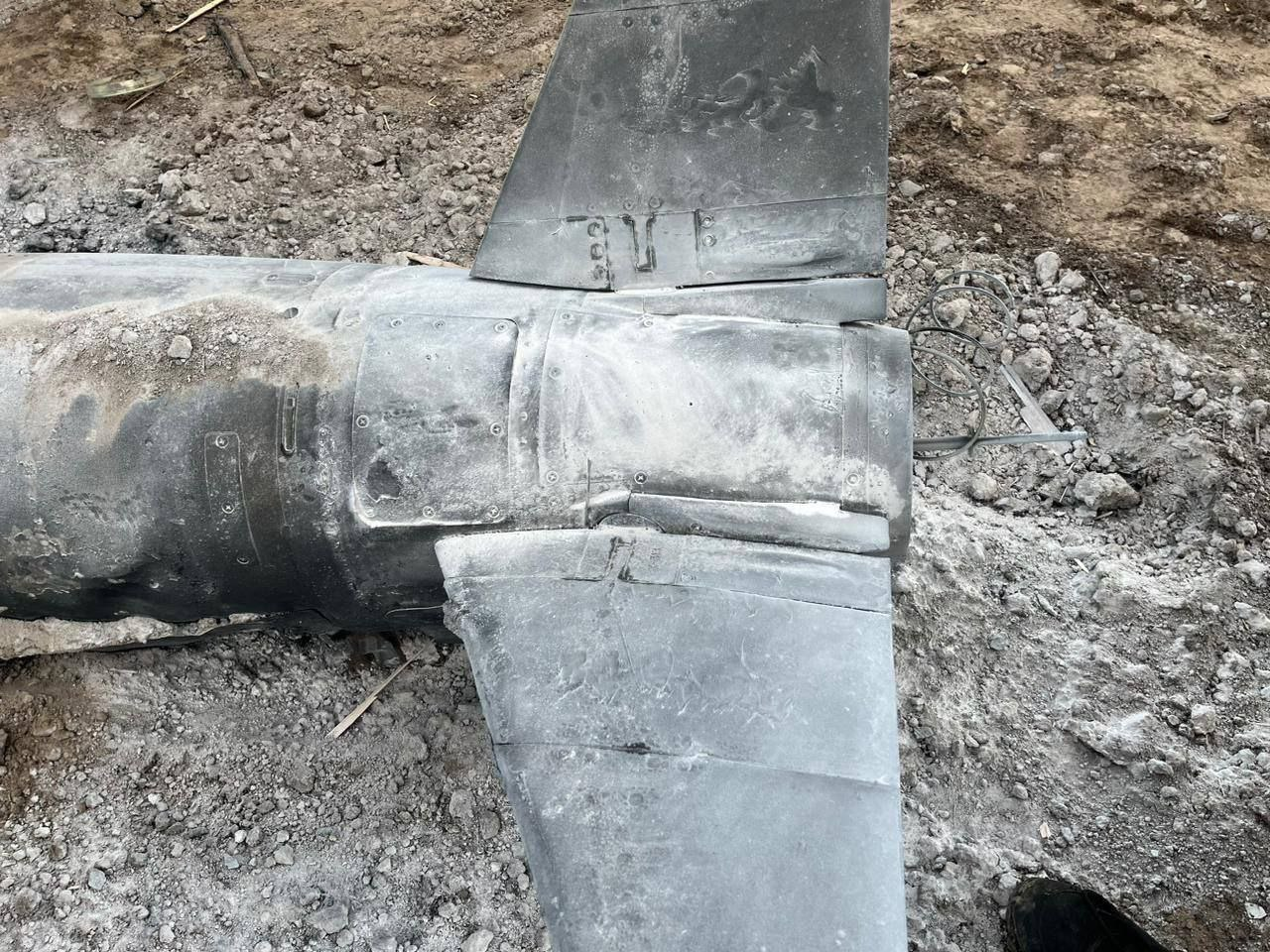
Remains of a downed Kh-55 missile in the Kyiv region

The Ukrainian Air Force claimed that twenty-five missiles were fired at Kyiv and other parts of Ukraine. Twenty-three were intercepted by air defence. While there were no reports of casualties, there was some property damage. Ukraine also said it had moved its Victory Day celebrations to May 8 in line with the rest of Europe, while 9 May will be called Europe Day.

French journalist Arman Soldin, who worked for Agence France Presse, was killed in a rocket attack in Chasiv Yar, near Bakhmut. He was with a team of AFP journalists travelling with Ukrainian soldiers when the group came under fire from Grad rockets.

=== 10 May ===
Russian artillery struck Vovchansk in Kharkiv Oblast killing one person, according to Governor Oleh Syniehubov. Three others were injured in shelling across the region.

The governors of Voronezh and Kursk Oblasts in Russia said that three drones were shot down by anti-aircraft defenses, with debris from one drone damaging a pipeline in Kursk. According to the Governor, Alexander Bogomaz, a Russian military enlistment office was damaged in Bryansk Oblast. An attack on a training ground in Voronezh Oblast wounded at least fourteen soldiers.

Yoshimasa Hayashi, Minister for Foreign Affairs of Japan, announced that Japan was in talks with NATO to set up a NATO liaison office at Tokyo, citing the Russian invasion of Ukraine and its threat to global stability. According to him, the liaison office would send a message to nations near Japan that "Japan is engaging in a very steady manner with NATO".

Czech President Petr Pavel, in a radio interview, offered the Aero L-159 ALCA to Ukraine, subject to a decision by the Czech government. They carry an array of western weapons that Ukrainian is already using and is also a descendant of the Aero L-39 Albatros that the Ukraine Air Force currently uses.

=== 11 May ===
The Ukrainian army said that they had broken through advancing Russian formations northwest of Bakhmut. Geolocated footage showed Ukrainian troops counterattacking near Khromove and Bila Hora, which Russian forces were trying to seize in order to encircle the city. Ukrainian sources said their forces advanced 2.6 km (1.6 mi) along a 3 km-wide (1.9-mile) front, destroying the 6th and 8th companies of the Russian 72nd Separate Motor Rifle Brigade; the head of the Wagner Group, Yevgeny Prigozhin, said already on 9 May that Russian troops had abandoned some positions on his flank in Bakhmut. The claim was also shared by Russian military bloggers but denied by the Russian Defence Ministry, which said that Russian forces repelled a surge of Ukrainian attacks in Soledar and that its forces had fallen back to "more favourable positions" near the Berkhivka reservoir northwest of Bakhmut for tactical reasons.

The United Kingdom Secretary for Defence Ben Wallace announced that the UK supplied Ukraine with Storm Shadow missiles. With a range of 250 kilometres, the missiles are capable of hitting targets in Crimea from the positions currently held by Ukraine. The United States supported the UK's decision. Secretary Wallace explained that these missiles were sent to Ukraine "to mitigate a situation where we (the UK) can't provide combat fighters."

The US ambassador to South Africa Reuben Brigety accused the country of supplying weapons to Russia despite its professed neutrality in the war in Ukraine, claiming that the Russian ship Lady R was loaded with ammunition and arms at Naval Base Simon's Town in Cape Town on 6–8 December 2022. The office of President Cyril Ramaphosa expressed disappointment over the claims and said no evidence had been provided to support them. An independent inquiry later confirmed Ramaphos's claims, while the South African Foreign Ministry said Brigety "apologized unreservedly" for his remarks.

A Russian court convicted 60-year old Saint Petersburg pensioner Irina Tsybaneva for desecrating the graves of President Vladimir Putin's parents at Serafimovskoe Cemetery. Tsybaneva, who was given a two-year suspended sentence, left a note at the Putin family plot referring to him as a "maniac", a "murderer" and a "monster" after claiming to have been "overwhelmed by fear" after watching news of the invasion of Ukraine. A military court sentenced history teacher Nikita Tushkanov of Komi Republic to five and a half years in prison for justifying "terrorism" and "discrediting" the Russian army after calling the Crimean Bridge explosion a "birthday present" for Putin in a social media post in October 2022.

=== 12 May ===
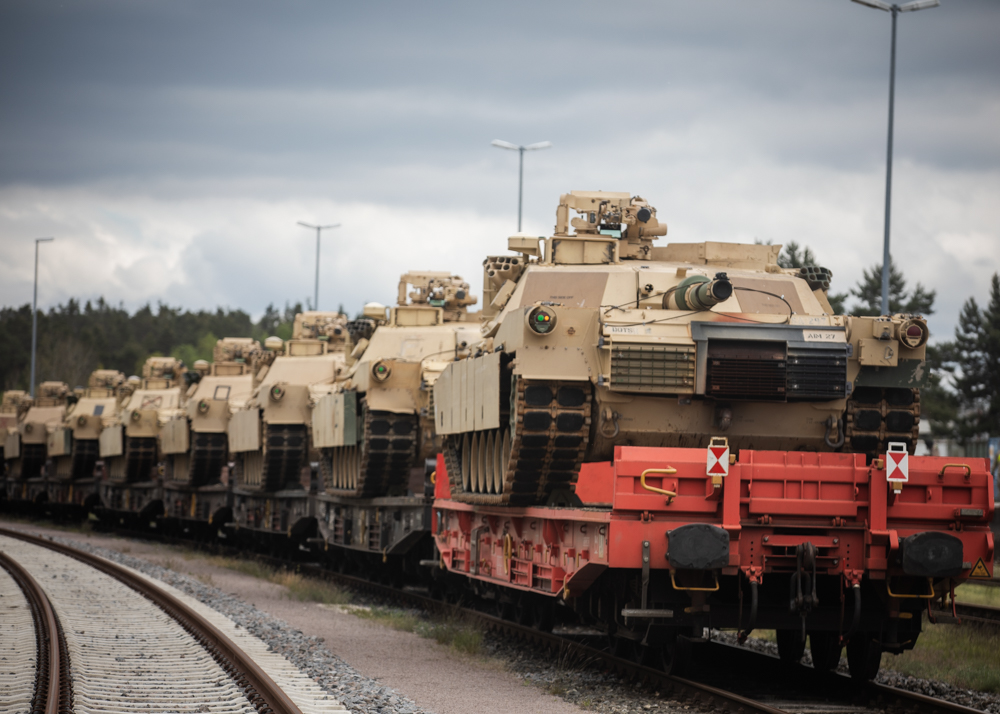
U.S. M1A1 Abrams tanks arrive at Grafenwoehr, Germany for use in training of Ukrainian troops, 12 May 2023

The exiled mayor of occupied Melitopol, Ivan Fedorov reported an explosion in the city center which led to outages in water, telecommunications and electricity in the eastern and northern districts of the city as well as surrounding villages; pro-Russian authorities confirmed the explosion and the power outage. Novaya Gazeta reported that an improvised explosive device was planted in a rubbish bin near an apartment block where the Russian-installed acting "deputy minister" of construction and public utilities lived, which exploded and injured him when he exited the building.

=== 13 May ===
Moments before Ukraine's entry to the Eurovision Song Contest 2023, Tvorchi, were due to perform in Liverpool in the United Kingdom, their hometown of Ternopil was struck by Russian missiles, injuring two people and damaging warehouses. This prompted them to close their performance with a message for solidarity with Ukraine. 11 people were also injured in overnight drone attacks in Khmelnytskyi. The Ukrainian military said that 18 out of 22 Iranian Shahed-131/136 drones were shot down in the attacks. Russia accused Ukraine of attacking the occupied city of Luhansk with its newly acquired British Storm Shadow missiles, wounding six children. It also claimed to have downed two Ukrainian aircraft, an Su-24 and a MiG-29, that launched the missiles. The Russian Defence Ministry said that Russian forces had seized a block in Bakhmut.

Two Russian helicopters, both Mi-8s, and two Russian fighters, an Su-34 and an Su-35, crashed in Bryansk Oblast, near the border with Ukraine with no survivors. Nine personnel were said to have been killed. The Russian newspaper Kommersant reported that the aircraft were on their way for a bombing run in neighboring Chernihiv Oblast when they were shot down by Ukrainian forces, which was also echoed by Russian pro-military bloggers. The Russian state news agency TASS only reported the loss of an Su-34 warplane without providing a reason, as well as that of a helicopter due to an engine fire near Klintsy, about 40 km (25 mi) from the international border. Ukrainian officials also said that the aircraft were on their way to a bombing run but blamed their downing on unidentified actors. The Kyiv Independent reported that Russian authorities were searching for "saboteurs" in connection with the crashes.

Ahead of President Volodymyr Zelenskyy's visit to Germany, Federal Defence Minister Boris Pistorius said that the country would provide Ukraine a military aid package worth 2.7bn euros ($2.95bn). Der Spiegel reported that the package includes 30 Leopard 1 A5 tanks, 20 Marder armoured personnel carriers, more than 100 combat vehicles, 18 self-propelled Howitzers, 200 reconnaissance drones, four IRIS-T SLM anti-aircraft systems and other air defence equipment.

An ammunition dump in Khmelnytskyi was destroyed by a Russian drone attack. A large explosion was reported followed by secondary detonations. Subsequent satellite photos showed that the "half-mile wide" storage area was completely destroyed.

Russia placed the British prosecutor of the ICC Karim Khan on a national wanted list after the ICC issued an arrest warrant for Vladimir Putin for overseeing the abduction of Ukrainian children.

=== 14 May ===
Russian missiles struck Ternopil Oblast, causing damage to civilian property. The Russian military claimed to have launched strikes on deployment points of Ukrainian forces and arms depots in the oblast as well as in Petropavlivka in Dnipropetrovsk Oblast.

The Governor of Russia's Bryansk Oblast said a Ukrainian drone attack damaged a food processing facility in Starodub.

The Russian Ministry of Defence confirmed the death of Colonels Vyacheslav Makarov and Yevgeny Brovko of the 4th Motorized Rifle Brigade during fighting in Bakhmut.

The Russian military said it had repelled Ukrainian attacks in the north and south of Bakhmut while Yevgeny Prigozhin, head of the Wagner Group said his forces had advanced up to 130 metres (430 ft) over the past 24 hours. He also claimed control over 28 multi-story buildings in western districts of Bakhmut and estimated Ukrainian forces were still holding 20 buildings and a total area of 1.69 square km (0.65 square miles). Meanwhile, the Ukrainian Defence Ministry said its forces captured more than ten enemy positions in the north and south of Bakhmut and cleared a large area of forest near Ivanivske. The Washington Post, citing leaked documents from the Pentagon, reported that Prigozhin secretly contacted Ukrainian intelligence in January 2023 to reveal Russian military positions in exchange for a Ukrainian withdrawal from Bakhmut, which was refused, and advised them to advance towards Crimea while informing them of shortages in Russian ammunition. Prigozhin denied the allegations in a Telegram statement on 15 May, while the Kremlin described the report as a hoax.

The Ukrainian air force said it destroyed 25 drones and three cruise missiles in another massive overnight attack by Russia. Seven people were killed and another 16 were injured in Russian shelling in Donetsk and Kherson oblasts. Russian-installed officials said mobile internet was temporarily suspended in occupied areas of Luhansk oblast due to increased shelling by Ukrainian troops.

=== 15 May ===
During President Zelenskyy's surprise visit to Paris, a joint statement from him and President Emmanuel Macron said that France would train and equip the Ukrainian military with tens of armoured vehicles and light tanks including the AMX-10RC. It also said that France would support Ukraine's air defence capacities and increase sanctions on Russia. Visiting the United Kingdom later that day, Zelenskyy was promised hundreds of air defence missiles, as well as "long-range attack drones" with a range of more than 200 km (120 mi) by Prime Minister Rishi Sunak.

The Governor of Kharkiv Oblast said two civilians were killed by Russian shelling in Dvorichna. Russia also shelled the town of Vovchansk, damaging three residential buildings, farm buildings and a hospital, while four buildings where damaged in Tsyschchenkova. Four people were killed in a Russian missile attack on a hospital in Avdiivka, Donetsk Oblast. Russia claimed to have shot down a British-supplied Storm Shadow missile for the first time as well as 10 HIMARS MLRS shells.

Igor Kornet, the acting interior minister of the Russian-backed Luhansk People's Republic, was reported to have been injured in an explosion at a barbershop in Luhansk city along with six other people. Four of the injured, including Kornet, were said to be in a "serious condition".

President Vladimir Putin signed a decree that simplified the process for its foreign volunteers in Ukraine to gain Russian citizenship and extended its eligibility to include their spouses, children and parents.

The US Central Intelligence Agency (CIA) launched a video and a Telegram channel calling on Russians dissatisfied with the situation in Ukraine as well as the domestic situation to share intelligence with the agency and provided instructions on how to do so.

=== 16 May ===
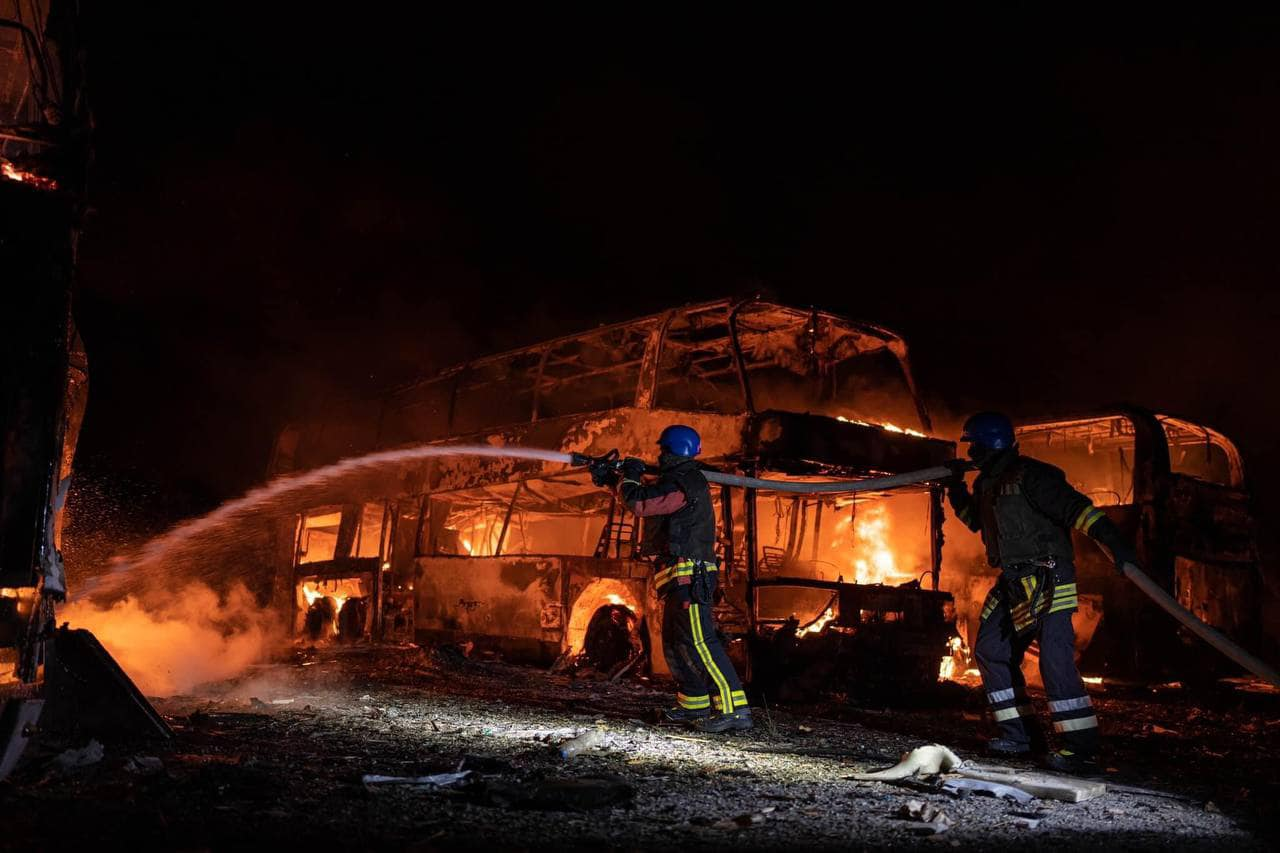
Burning buses in Kyiv after the attack

Kyiv came under air attack in the early hours of the morning. Vitali Klitschko, Kyiv's Mayor, said that debris from intercepted missiles struck the city zoo in the Solomianskyi District and the Shevchenkivskyi District, as well as several cars, and wounded three people. According to Kyiv's military administrator, Serhiy Popko, the attack was "exceptional", as it involved "the maximum number of attack missiles in the shortest period of time." Ukraine stated all eighteen missiles were shot down, including six Kh-47M2 Kinzhal missiles. The attacks came from the north, south and east while being launched from air, land and sea, according to Ukrainian military commander Valerii Zaluzhny. However, Russian Defence Minister Sergei Shoigu dismissed the Ukrainian claims, saying that they had launched a lesser amount of missiles. The Russian Ministry of Defence claimed to have destroyed a US-built Patriot surface-to-air missile defense system with a Kinzhal missile. A US official later told CNN that a Patriot system was likely damaged but not destroyed during the attack, and that assessments for potential damage were ongoing. According to a US official the Patriot system could be repaired in Ukraine. Due to modular nature of the system it may just require the replacement of a damaged component with a new one.

Denis Pushilin, head of the Russian-backed Donetsk People's Republic, said that Russian forces had seized several Ukrainian positions near Avdiivka. The Ukrainian Defence Ministry said that its forces had retaken about 20sq km (7.5sq miles) of territory from Russian forces in the north and south of the outskirts of Bakhmut in recent days while acknowledging continued Russian advances inside the city. The Wagner Group's head Yevgeny Prigozhin claimed that an American citizen was killed fighting in Bakhmut, in a video posted on Telegram that showed him inspecting a body and what he claimed to be US identification documents.

In Kharkiv Oblast, two people where killed in another bout of Russian shelling in Dvorichna.

South African President Cyril Ramaphosa said both Presidents Putin and Zelenskyy had agreed to receive an African mission that would propose a peace plan. He said the plan was backed by the presidents of Senegal, Uganda and Egypt and that UN Secretary-General António Guterres, the United States and the United Kingdom had also been briefed. The commander of the land forces of the South African National Defence Force, Lieutenant-General Lawrence Mbatha, visited Moscow.

A Moscow court sentenced Colombian resident and Russian passport-holder Alberto Enrique Giraldo Saray to five years and two months in prison for spreading "fake news" about the actions of the Russian military in Ukraine.

The US State Department condemned the arrest of a local embassy employee in Russia for alleged spying. Robert Shonov, who worked in the US consulate in Vladivostok before being subcontracted to summarize Russian media reports for the embassy in Moscow was arrested, charged with cooperating "on a confidential basis with a foreign state, [or] international or foreign organisation", and detained at Lefortovo Prison. The State Department said the allegations were without merit. The FSB later said it had charged Shonov for “confidential collaboration” with a foreign state, allegedly collecting information on the Russian war effort in Ukraine, its military draft and protest activities in the run-up to the 2024 presidential elections.

Hungary blocked the disbursement of an upcoming tranche of military support for Ukraine provided under the European Union's European Peace Facility (EPF), arguing that the fund was too focused on Ukraine and that the funds could be used elsewhere. Hungarian Foreign Minister Peter Szijjarto previously said that the country would block the disbursement as well as any new sanctions package on Russia until Ukraine removed OTP Bank, Hungary's largest commercial bank, in the list of sponsors of the war in Ukraine due to the position of the bank's management to continue operations in Russia and its client republics in the Donbas, which itself was based on a decision by the National Agency for the Prevention of Corruption of Ukraine. Hungary also demanded the removal of three people from a new sanctions list proposed by the European Commission as part of the 11th package of sanctions against Russia.

British Prime Minister Rishi Sunak and Dutch Prime Minister Mark Rutte agreed to build an "international coalition" to provide fighter jet support for Ukraine, particularly in improving its combat air capabilities, pilot training and the procurement of F-16 jets.

A court in Kyrgyzstan convicted and sentenced a 32-year-old man to 10 years in prison for mercenarism after finding that he had joined Russian forces fighting in the Donbas between June and November 2022, for which he was paid 180,000 rubles ($2,250) per month plus an assurance of a Russian passport.

=== 17 May ===
The Security Service of Ukraine identified and charged six individuals with "illegally disseminating" information about Ukrainian air defences in Kyiv. These individuals took videos of Ukrainian air defences in action then posted them on social media sites such as YouTube. Such information, the SBU alleged, could be used to make Russian strikes more accurate. The penalty for such a charge was five to eight years imprisonment.

Russia's defence ministry claimed its forces had destroyed a British-made L-119 howitzer in Ukraine according to a report by state news agency TASS. It also claimed to have struck an ammunition depot in Mykolaiv.

The DSM Capella, the last ship to sail under the Black Sea Grain Initiative before its expected expiration on 18 May, left the Ukrainian port of Chornomorsk carrying 30,000 tonnes of corn bound for Turkey. Shortly afterwards, Turkish President Recep Tayyip Erdoğan said that the grain exportation deal between Ukraine and Russia had been extended for two more months. Both Russia and Ukraine welcomed the extension.

A child and two others were reported to have been killed and three people were injured after a Russian shell struck outside a shop in Zelenivka, Kherson Oblast. In Donetsk, the city's Russian-backed mayor claimed Ukrainian shelling left five dead and 15 injured.

A Moscow court ordered the arrests of film producer Alexander Rodnyansky and theatre director Ivan Vyrypaev for "spreading false information" about the Russian army, with Vyrypaev additionally being placed on the Russian federal wanted list by the Interior Ministry. Both individuals had been living in exile for their opposition to the war in Ukraine. Another court sentenced opposition figure and anti-war activist Mikhail Krieger to seven years in prison on charges of justifying terrorism and inciting hatred with the threat of violence prior to the invasion. Prior to his sentencing, Krieger said that he was being prosecuted for his "anti-war and now openly pro-Ukrainian position".

During a summit in Iceland, the Council of Europe approved a "Register of Damage" to document actions of Russian forces in Ukraine for future claims of compensation against Russia. The United States, which attended the summit as an observer, Canada and Japan also supported the register.

=== 18 May ===
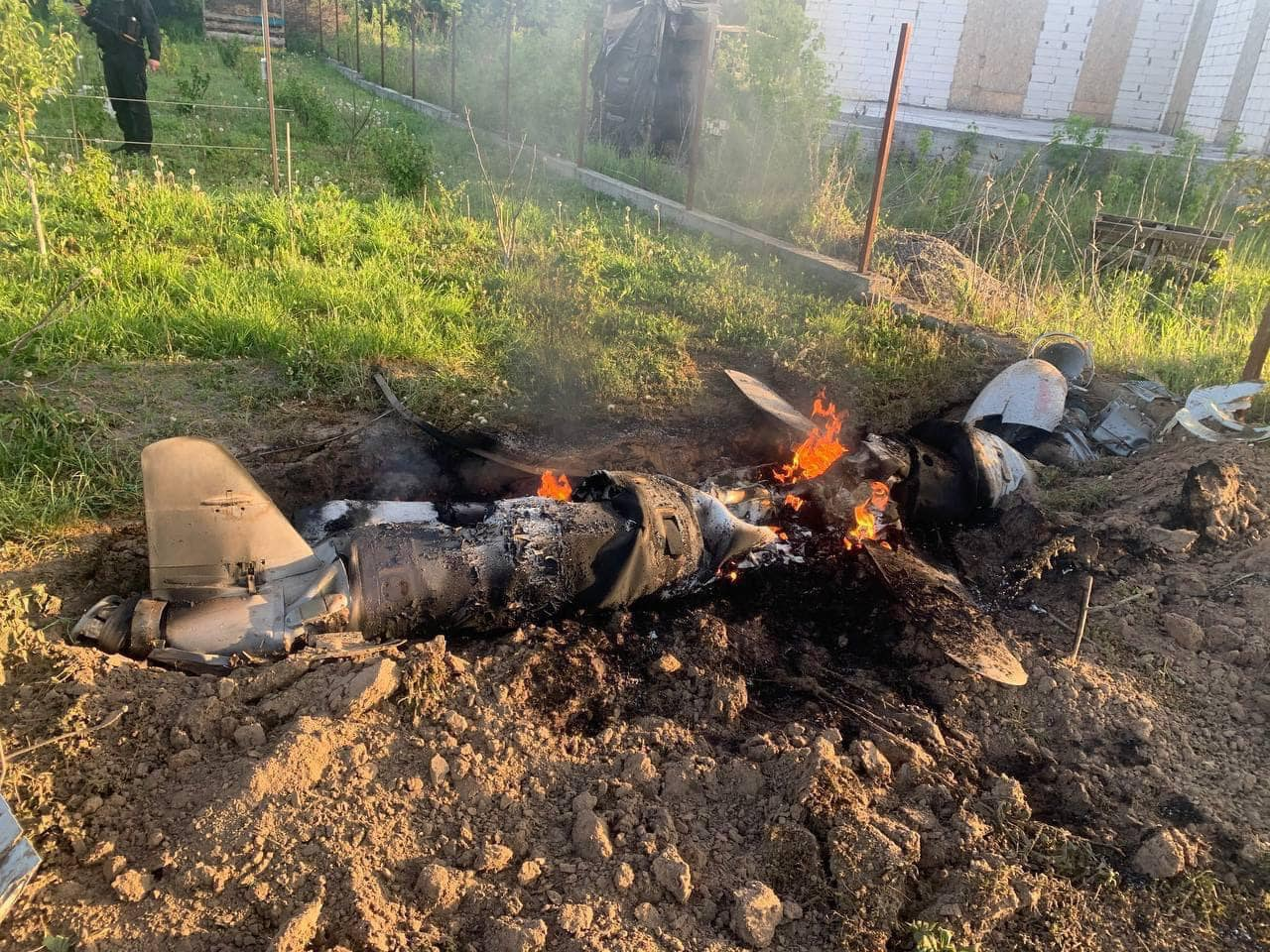
A downed Russian cruise missile in Kyiv region

Russian forces targeted Kyiv and the Odesa region according to Ukrainian authorities. Explosions were heard over Kyiv with one garage complex being set on fire by falling debris in the Darnytskyi District and another fire breaking out in Desnianskyi District. In Odesa, one person was reported killed and two wounded when an "industrial object" was struck. The missiles used were Kh-101s and Kh-55s, reportedly fired from strategic bombers. Airstrikes were also reported in Vinnytsia and Khmelnytskyi Oblasts. The Ukrainian Air Force, in a statement, claimed 29 of the 30 missiles were intercepted. This was the ninth air raid aimed at Kyiv this month. The Russian Defence Ministry claimed to have destroyed all its designated targets in the airstrikes, including weapons and ammunitions stocks.

A train between Simferopol and Sevastopol, on Crimea, was derailed by an explosion causing the suspension of rail traffic between the two cities.

Wagner Group head Yevgeny Prigozhin again complained, in a video message, of setbacks by the Russian military in Bakhmut, claiming that they had withdrawn up to 570 meters (1,870 feet) to the north of the city, exposing Wagner's flanks. He claimed that Wagner mercenaries had advanced up to 400 meters inside the city, while the Ukrainian Defence Ministry said its forces had advanced 500 meters in the north of the city and up to one kilometer in the south side while retaining the southwestern part of Bakhmut.

Hussein Dzhambetov, a commanding officer from the pro-Ukrainian Chechen Separate Special Purpose Battalion defected to Russia.

The US government told CNN that it would not block any requests by their allies to transfer their own F-16s to Ukraine but would not send its own F-16s to Ukraine. The question of training such pilots remained unanswered, which would likely involve some US involvement.

French President Emmanuel Macron had announced earlier France would supply SCALP-EG missiles, which are similar to the Storm Shadow.

=== 19 May ===
The Ukrainian military said it had repelled another Russian air attack in the morning, destroying 19 drones and three Kalibr missiles out of a total of 28 launched. An elderly woman was seriously injured during airstrikes on Kryvyi Rih.

The Pentagon announced that it had made an accounting error in relation to the aid supplied to Ukraine. The error was made when the Pentagon overestimated to Congress, by at least $3 billion, the cost of weapons sent to Ukraine. This error meant that these funds were effectively a surplus that could be spent on more weapons for Ukraine. President Biden said he would support a joint effort with allies to train Ukrainian pilots on fourth generation aircraft, including F-16s fighter jets. Shortly afterwards, Denmark said it would provide direct help in training. No date was announced for such training to commence. Once it does it could take six to nine months to properly train Ukrainian pilots and crews to use the F-16. A US official told CNN that the United States was prepared to help train Ukrainian pilots on the F-16. The training would take place in Europe in the "coming weeks", along with European allies, while a decision on the number of aircraft would be made at a later date.

During the 49th G7 summit in Hiroshima, Japan, UK Prime Minister Rishi Sunak announced that the government was introducing new sanctions against Russian exports, particularly on diamonds, nickel, copper and aluminum. He also said that the government would also target 86 more people and companies connected to President Putin, including people who were "actively undermining the impact of existing sanctions". Sunak said that the new sanctions were made to ensure Russia paid "a price for its illegal activity" and urged other G7 countries to follow suit. The United States also announced that it would tighten export controls to Russia, particularly with regard to militarily important goods, and impose nearly 300 new sanctions against targets linked to Russia. Canada also imposed sanctions on targets linked to the Russian military, relatives of listed persons, members of the Kremlin elite, and those involved in human rights violations.

In response to these sanctions, the Russian Foreign Ministry announced a ban on entry into the country on 500 Americans including former President Barack Obama, comedians Stephen Colbert, Jimmy Kimmel and Seth Meyers, Senators JD Vance, Katie Britt and Eric Schmitt, former US Ambassador Jon Huntsman Jr., presumptive Chairman of the Joint Chiefs of Staff General Charles Q. Brown Jr. and several journalists of CNN. Also included were officials involved in the prosecution of participants in the United States Capitol attack in 2021. It also continued to deny US consular access to detained journalist Evan Gershkovich in retaliation for the blocking of entry to Russian journalists during Foreign Minister Sergei Lavrov's visit to the UN in New York in April 2023. In conjunction, the Russian Interior Ministry issued an arrest warrant for the International Criminal Court's Prosecutor Karim Ahmad Khan, who was responsible for issuing Putin's arrest warrant in March 2023, while the Prosecutor-General of Russia deemed the environmental organization Greenpeace an "undesirable organization", calling it "a threat to the foundations of the constitutional order and security" of the country for interfering in the "internal affairs of the state" and spreading "anti-Russian propaganda" and calling for economic sanctions. The order prompted Greenpeace to halt its operations in Russia.

Yevgeny Roizman, former mayor of Yekaterinburg and opposition politician, was convicted and fined 260,000 rubles ($3245) for discrediting the Russian army over comments made regarding the war in Ukraine.

Ukraine was losing some 10,000 drones a month due to Russian electronic warfare according to report by the Royal United Services Institute.

=== 20 May ===
Eighteen Russian Shahed drones were launched at Kyiv. According to the Ukrainian Air Force all eighteen were shot down. Falling debris set fire to the roof of a residential complex in the Dniprovskyi District. This was the eleventh attack on the capital during the month of May. The Ukrainian Air Force also claimed to have destroyed two drones in the country's "east" and one in the "south" without further details.

Yevgeny Prigozhin claimed on Telegram that his Wagner mercenaries had completely captured Bakhmut. This was denied by Ukraine, which nevertheless called the situation in the city "critical". The Russian Defence Ministry later confirmed the capture of the city, with President Putin sending his congratulations.

Ukrainian President Volodymyr Zelenskyy met with Indian Prime Minister Narendra Modi at the G7 summit in Hiroshima for the first time since the Russian invasion of Ukraine.

Pyotr Kucherenko, deputy science and higher education minister of the Russian Federation, suddenly fell ill on a plane returning from a business trip to Cuba. The aircraft landed at Mineralnye Vody however doctors were unable to save the minister's life. Kucherenko had reportedly called the war in Ukraine a "fascist invasion" in private. Exiled journalist Roman Super spoke to him "days before" his death, where Kucherenko expressed fears for his safety. The minister also had a preexisting heart condition.

=== 21 May ===
President Zelenskyy appeared to confirm the fall of Bakhmut to Russia, saying in an interview to AFP that "For today, Bakhmut is only in our hearts" and that "nothing" was left of the city. However, he and his office later clarified that he had not said that the city had fallen. The Ukrainian Defence Ministry said its forces were holding on to a sector of the city while partly encircling Bakhmut itself.

A Russian-installed official in occupied Zaporizhzhia Oblast said that the Ukrainian military had attacked the port of Berdiansk with seven missiles, including four British-supplied Storm Shadows. He said six of the missiles had been intercepted and one had fallen on the edge of the city but had not caused any casualties. The Ukrainian military later confirmed that they had struck a Russian headquarters in the city.

President Biden confirmed a new military aid package worth $375 million for Ukraine, saying the United States would provide ammunition, artillery, armored vehicles and training. He also said that he received reassurances from President Zelenskyy that any F-16s supplied to Ukraine will not be used for incursions on internationally recognized Russian territory itself.

An administrative building in the village of Golovchino in Russia's Belgorod Oblast caught fire. Russian officials blamed the fire on a "quadcopter".

Japan announced the delivery of one hundred military vehicles and thirty thousand ration kits to Ukraine.

=== 22 May ===
At least eight people were injured and multiple buildings were damaged by a Russian air strike in Dnipropetrovsk Oblast, according to the Ukrainian Air Force. Ukrainian officials also claimed that Russian forces fired some sixteen missiles, of different types, and twenty "Shahed-136/131 drones". Ukraine claimed to have shot down four cruise missiles and all of the drones. The governor of Kharkiv Oblast said two women were wounded by Russian shelling in Kupiansk. One person was killed by Russian shelling in Stanislav, Kherson Oblast.

The occupied Zaporizhzhia Nuclear Power Plant went offline for several hours before being reconnected. Ukraine's nuclear agency Energoatom had accused Russia of carrying out attacks that caused a power cut, adding that it was the seventh time the plant entered "blackout mode" since Russian troops took control in March 2022.

The governor of Russia's Belgorod Oblast, Vyacheslav Gladkov, said that Ukrainian shelling injured three people in the city of Grayvoron, which borders Ukraine, and damaged three residential buildings and an administration building. He also said that Ukrainian attacks had injured two people in the village of Glotovo in Grayvoronsky District and accused a Ukrainian "sabotage" group of crossing the border in carrying out an attack. Two civilians were reported to have been killed. Footage purportedly showing a Ukrainian tank attacking a Russian border post also appeared on a Telegram channel linked to Russian security services. However, Ukrainian presidential advisor Mykhailo Podolyak said Kyiv had "nothing to do" with the attack and said Russian anti-Kremlin guerrilla groups were responsible. The Liberty of Russia Legion and the Russian Volunteer Corps (RVC) later claimed responsibility for the attack, with the Legion claiming to have taken the border town of Kozinka and reached Graivoron. Evacuations were ordered in nine villages and a counter-terrorist operation were ordered in the affected areas by the regional government, while the Russian military dispatched fighter jets and artillery to the scene. The Institute for the Study of War later assessed that two "all-Russian pro-Ukrainian" groups had crossed the border with tanks, armoured personnel carriers and other armoured vehicles. Attacks were also reported on offices of the Interior Ministry and the FSB in Belgorod city. Gladkov later said 13 civilians were injured, damage was recorded in 29 houses and three cars were damaged and electricity was lost in 14 settlements.

The NATO Parliamentary Assembly issued a declaration recognizing Russian atrocities in Ukraine as "genocide" according to the head of the Ukrainian delegation Yehor Cherniev. He said that the declaration included support for an international tribunal for Russian war crimes, helping Ukraine win the war and a commitment to help restore the country's territories by implementing more sanctions.

=== 23 May ===
In its evening report, the Ukrainian military reported that there were 25 air strikes and 20 incidents of shelling reported across the country for the day, but no missile attacks.

Yevgeny Prigozhin, head of the Wagner Group, promised to transfer control of the Ukrainian city of Bakhmut to the Russian army by 1 June. In an interview, he said that more than 20,000 of his fighters died in the battle for the city, and acknowledged that the Russian military had killed civilians.

President Zelenskyy visited naval infantry troops along the Vuhledar-Maryinka defence line in Donetsk Oblast as part of commemorations of the Day of the Ukrainian Marines. He announced that new marine brigades would be added to the Ukrainian military's existing units.

The governor of Donetsk Oblast said Russian aerial bombs struck Toretsk, damaging a school but causing no casualties.

The Russian Ministry of Defence said that it had forced back "nationalists" who had launched the cross-border attacks in Belgorod Oblast back into Ukraine, adding that its forces had killed more than 70 "Ukrainian terrorists" and destroyed four armored combat vehicles and five pickups. The Governor of Russia's Kursk Oblast said three villages bordering Ukraine were left without power after a drone dropped explosives on an electrical substation.

Ukraine accused Russia of blocking access to the port of Pivdennyi to grain exports despite the resumption of the Black Sea Grain Initiative.

EU Foreign Policy chief Josep Borrell said that the total amount of weaponry sent to Ukraine by the bloc since March 2023 had reached 220,000 artillery shells and 1,300 missiles.

The SBU launched a criminal investigation against Maj. Gen. Andrey Ruzinsky, commander of the Russian Baltic Fleet's 11th Army Corps for his role in the invasion and occupation of parts of Kharkiv Oblast and subsequent atrocities, particularly in Balakliia. The Prosecutor General of Ukraine also opened an investigation into the role of Belarus in the forced transfer of children from Russian-occupied territories, following a report by the exiled Belarusian opposition group National Anti-Crisis Management, alleging that 2,150 Ukrainian children, including orphans aged six to 15, were taken to at least three so-called recreation camps and sanatoriums on Belarusian territory.

Polish Defence Minister Mariusz Błaszczak said that the government was ready to train Ukrainian pilots on F-16 aircraft but it rejected supplying F-16s to Ukraine, fearing a "degrading effect" on the Polish Air Force.

The Russian Defence Ministry said it had deployed an Su-27 fighter jet to intercept and prevent two US Air Force B-1B strategic bombers from entering its airspace over the Baltic Sea. The Pentagon later confirmed the incident, saying that aircraft were taking part in a planned exercise and the Russian fighter's interaction with the planes was "safe and professional".

=== 24 May ===
The governor of Russia's Belgorod Oblast said that a drone dropped an explosive device on a road in Belgorod city, damaging a car but leaving no casualties.

During its annual assembly in Geneva, member states of the World Health Organization voted 80 votes to nine, with 52 abstentions, to condemn Russian aggression in Ukraine, including attacks on health care facilities, civilians and critical civilian infrastructure. All 27 EU members co-sponsored the move, with the exception of Hungary, which was absent from the vote. Besides Russia, the countries that voted against the draft resolution included China, North Korea, Syria, Belarus, Cuba and Algeria.

The Russian Defence Ministry said the Ukrainian military launched an unsuccessful attack on the reconnaissance ship Ivan Khurs in the Black Sea using three unmanned speedboats. Video evidence the following day showed that one of the vessels had seemingly hit the Ivan Khurs.

The Orthodox Church of Ukraine said it was switching to the new "Julian Calendar" from 1 September, in an effort to distance itself from the Russian Orthodox Church and citing Russian aggression. This was expected to lead to festivals like Christmas to be celebrated on 25 December instead of 7 January in Ukraine.

The Russian Southern District Military Court in Rostov-on-Don said that five foreign nationals (Britons John Harding, Andrew Hill, and Dylan Heal, Swedish citizen Mathias Gustafsson, and Croatian national Vjekoslav Prebeg) were to be tried in absentia on 31 May for alleged terrorism and other charges. The men had been captured in 2022 during fighting in the Donbas and were released in a series of prisoner exchanges.

Latvia pledged 2 million euros ($2.15 million) to support the reconstruction of Chernihiv, according to its City Council. The funds were to be used in projects such as buying school equipment and restoring water and sewage systems.

The United States Defense Security Cooperation Agency has authorised the sale of a NASAMS system to Ukraine valued at $285 million.

=== 25 May ===
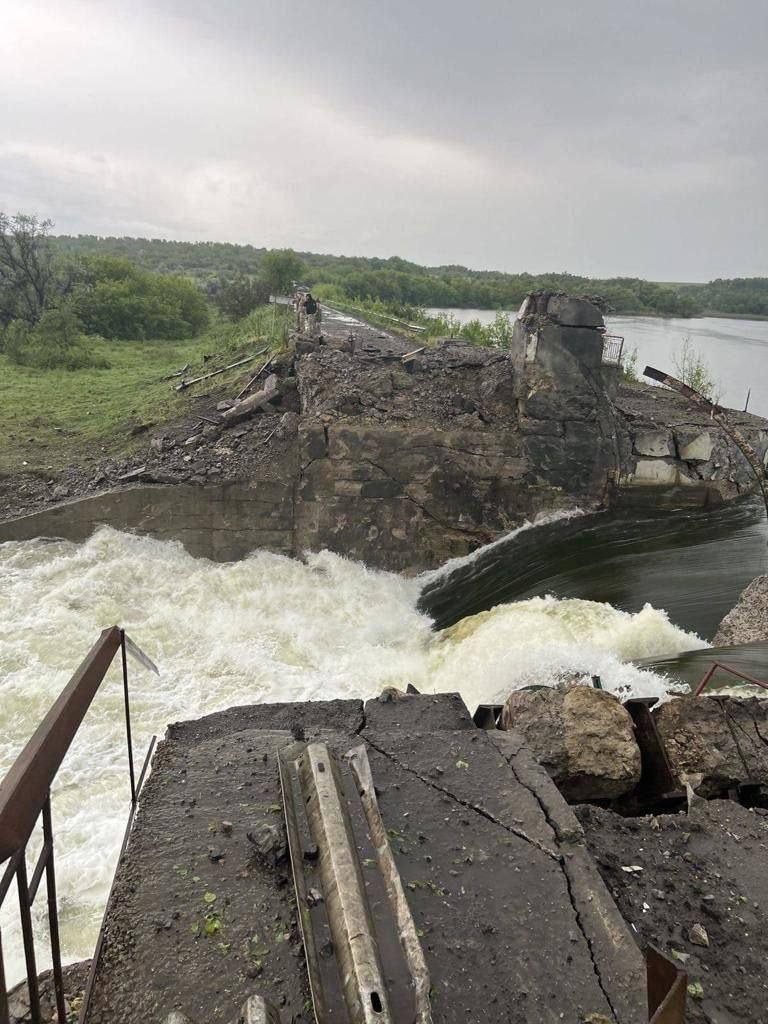
The Karlivka Reservoir dam after Russian shelling, 25 May 2023

Ukrainian President Volodymyr Zelenskyy claimed that air defences had shot down some thirty six Shahed drones. In occupied Crimea, the regional governor said six Ukrainian drones were shot down. In an interview with Die Welt, Vadym Skibitsky, deputy head of Ukraine's military intelligence service, said the government intends to assassinate Putin "because he coordinates and decides what happens" in the war.

Yevgeny Prigozhin announced the start of the turnover of Bakhmut from his Wagner mercenaries to the Russian military and his forces' withdrawal from the city. He also said they would repatriate the bodies of an American national, whom he identified as a former special forces soldier named Nicholas Maimer, and a Turkish citizen, which they claimed to have recovered from the remains of a building blown up by Ukrainian forces, adding that the body of another Turkish national, a woman, was also found but could not be retrieved. 106 Ukrainian POWs captured in Bakhmut were repatriated to Ukraine in a prisoner exchange with Russia.

The FSB announced that it had arrested two members of a Ukrainian "sabotage group" and two Russian accomplices who were plotting to bomb power lines connected to the Leningrad and Kalinin Nuclear Power Plants, adding that 36.5 kilos of explosives and about 60 detonators were recovered from them.

The Russian Defence Ministry said it had scrambled Su-27 and Su-35 fighter jets to intercept two US Air Force B-1B strategic bombers near the country's airspace boundary over the Baltic Sea.

Russia and Belarus signed an agreement that formalized the deployment of Russian tactical nuclear weapons in Belarusian territory, with control and usage over the weapons remaining in Russian hands. Shortly afterwards, Belarusian President Aleksandr Lukashenko confirmed that the transfer of weapons to the country had begun and later said countries joining the Union State would also be given nuclear weapons.

The Russian Foreign Ministry announced that it was expelling five Swedish diplomats from the country in retaliation for the expulsion of five Russian diplomats from Sweden in April 2023. It also summoned the German, Danish and Swedish ambassadors in protest over a "complete lack of results" in their investigations into the identity of the perpetrators of the 2022 Nord Stream pipeline sabotage.

A Swedish appeals court upheld the conviction and life imprisonment of former security services and armed forces employee Peyman Kia for espionage on behalf of Russia.

Finland announced it was sending additional military equipment to Ukraine, including anti-aircraft weaponry and ammunition worth 109 million euros ($120 million).

Former Russian President Dmitry Medvedev said, during a visit to Vietnam, that he believed that the war with Ukraine could last a "very long time, most likely decades", with periods of truce and then conflict. Medvedev is currently the Deputy Chair of the Security Council of the Russian Federation.

=== 26 May ===
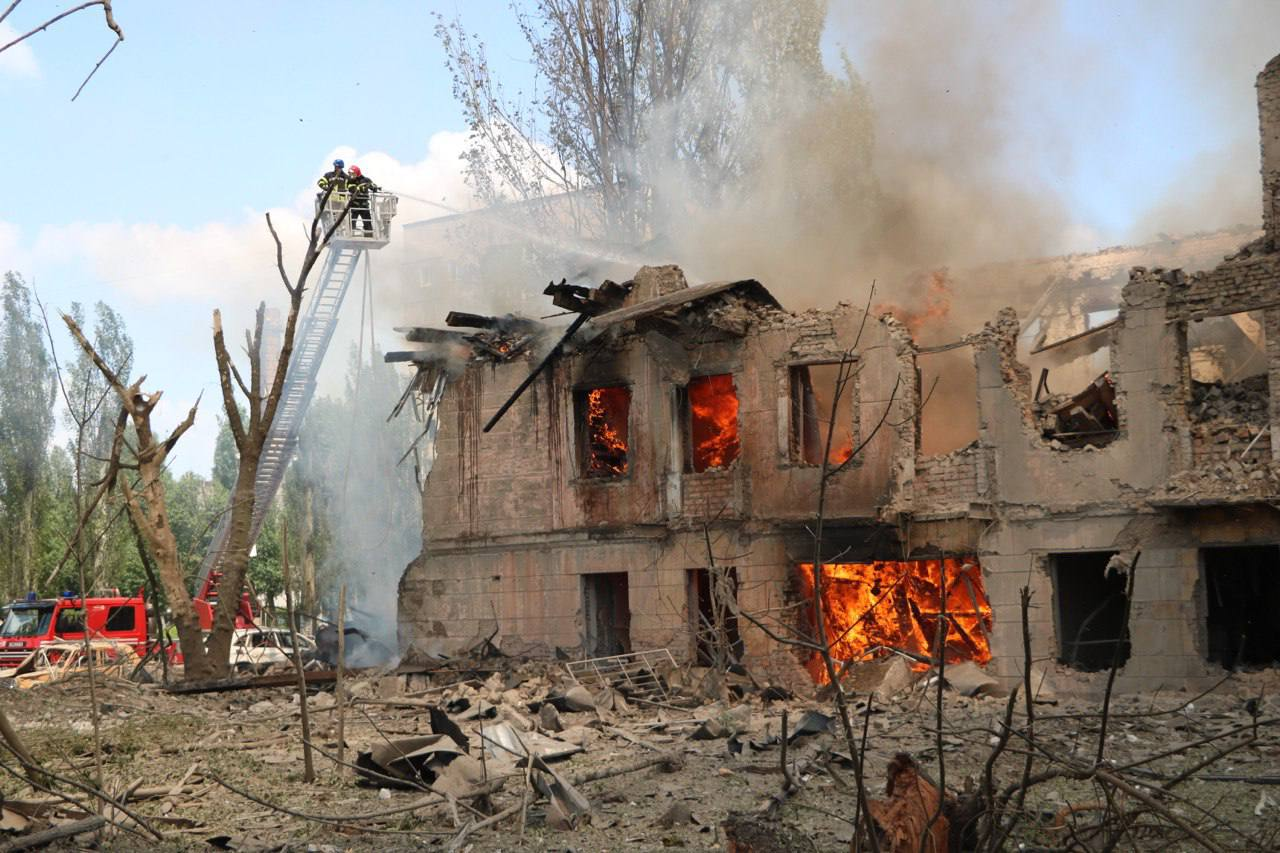
Hospital in Dnipro after the strike

Ukrainian authorities said they shot down 17 missiles and 31 drones launched from Russia overnight. Strikes were reported in Dnipro and Kharkiv, including an oil depot. In Kyiv, fragments of intercepted drones fell on the roof of a shopping centre, while a house and several cars were damaged. A Russian S-300 missile hit a dam in Karlivka, Donetsk Oblast, placing nearby settlements under threat of severe flooding from the Karlivske Reservoir. Two people were killed and 23 injured in a missile strike at a clinic in Dnipro. The Russian Defence Ministry claimed it had struck ammunition depots in those attacks and said all targets had been hit.

In Russia, a blast alleged to have been caused by two Ukrainian drones damaged a residential and office building in Krasnodar. Four districts in Belgorod Oblast were shelled from the Ukrainian border, while a Ukrainian missile was reportedly shot down over Morozovsk, in Rostov Oblast.

The United States announced sanctions against Ivan Maslov, head of the Wagner Group's operations in Mali, saying that the group was procuring weaponry across Africa to use in the war in Ukraine. The Japanese Foreign Ministry announced additional sanctions on Russia, saying that it would freeze the assets of 78 groups and 17 individuals, including army officers and ban exports to 80 entities such as military-affiliated research labs. It also said it would ban providing construction and engineering services to Russia.

The Russian Foreign Ministry summoned senior US diplomats after comments on 21 May by US National Security Adviser Jake Sullivan appeared to support Ukrainian attacks on Russian-annexed Crimea using Western weaponry.

The German Defence Ministry said it was moving its Patriot missile battery deployed in Slovakia to Lithuania to secure the NATO summit to be held in Vilnius in July.

The Prosecutor-General of Ukraine released figures showing that at least 483 children had been killed during the conflict and nearly 1,000 others were wounded, with the National Social Service of Ukraine saying that nearly 1,500 children had been orphaned. Most of these casualties came from Donetsk Oblast, with 462 recorded individuals. 278 casualties were recorded in Kharkiv Oblast, 128 in Kyiv Oblast, 102 in Kherson Oblast, 91 in Zaporizhzhia Oblast, 89 in Mykolaiv Oblast, 72 in Dnipropetrovsk Oblast, 70 in Chernihiv Oblast and 67 in Luhansk Oblast. UNICEF also said an estimated 1.5 million Ukrainian children were at risk of depression, anxiety, post-traumatic stress disorder and other mental health issues.

The intelligence directorate of the Ukrainian Defence Ministry warned of a plot by Russia to stage an incident at the Zaporizhzhia Nuclear Power Plant to stall Ukraine's anticipated counteroffensive.

Canada's Defence Minister Anita Anand announced that her country would supply the Ukrainian Air Force with 43 AIM-9X Block II Sidewinder missiles to help intercept Kh-101 and Shahed type Iranian made Drones. It is the first official acknowledged delivery of western air to air missiles.

=== 27 May ===
A spokeswoman for the German Defence Ministry confirmed that Ukraine had formally asked to be supplied with the Taurus KEPD 350 cruise missile.

In Kharkiv Oblast, a woman was killed and another civilian was injured by Russian shelling in Kupiansk.

Mikhail Vedernikov, Governor of Russia's Pskov Oblast, claimed that two drones struck an administrative building for a nearby oil pipeline, causing an explosion. No casualties were reported, however the building was damaged. The attack occurred less than ten kilometres from the Belarus border. In Kursk Oblast, a construction worker was reported to have been killed by Ukrainian shelling near the village of Plekhovo, a few kilometers from the international border. Another civilian, a security guard was killed by shelling in Shebekino, Belgorod Oblast.

The Russian Defence Ministry claimed that its forces had intercepted two Storm Shadow missiles, 19 drones and several HIMARS and HARM missiles from Ukraine in the past 24 hours.

The German Foreign Ministry confirmed that hundreds of its educational and cultural workers, including employees at the German school in Moscow and at the local branch of the Goethe Institute were to be expelled from Russia starting in June after it imposed a limit on the number of German employees in retaliation for the expulsion of Russian diplomats and staff from Germany.

In an interview with Ukrainian journalist Dmytro Komarov, Vasyl Malyuk, the head of the SBU, confirmed the agency's involvement in the Crimean Bridge explosion in 2022, saying that it was being used as a logistics route by Russia.

=== 28 May ===
The Mayor of Kyiv, Vitali Klitschko, claimed that Russian drones attacked the Ukrainian capital. Two people were killed by falling drone debris, while a woman was injured. Two high-rise apartments were set on fire. The Ukrainian Air Force claimed that 58 out of 59 drones had been shot down, with more than 40 of them intercepted over Kyiv. Fires were reported in the Solomyanskyi, Holosiivskyi and Pecherskyi Districts. The attack came on the anniversary of Kyiv's founding in 482 AD. It was later described as Russia's largest drone attack on Kyiv since the war began.

Air raid alerts were activated in 12 oblasts, from Volyn in the north-west to Dnipropetrovsk in the south-east. There were also reports of explosions in Zhytomyr, where at least 26 residential buildings were damaged as well as schools and medical units. Shelling was also reported in Sumy Oblast, which borders Russia, and in Nikopol, across the Dnipro River from the Zaporizhzhia Nuclear Power Plant.

Russia said its air defences shot down several drones approaching the Ilsky oil refinery in Krasnodar Krai.

The Ukrainian General Staff claimed that 80 Russian soldiers deserted their positions in Lysychansk, Luhansk Oblast, while 30 others deserted from Bakhmut. Valerii Zaluzhnyi, Commander-in-Chief of the Armed Forces of Ukraine, reported that all the preparations for the anticipated major counter-attack are complete and that they were only waiting for the decision to strike.

=== 29 May ===
Russia launched its 15th air attack of the month and its second consecutive attack in Kyiv in the early morning hours. Damage was reported in the Podilskyi District, with a "one-storey private residence" being struck by falling debris. Debris was reported to have struck buildings in the Sviatoshyn and Holosiivskyi districts as well. The attack involved drones and cruise missiles. The Kyiv City Military Administration claimed to have shot down forty targets.

Shortly afterwards during daytime, Russia launched its 16th attack on Kyiv for the month. The Ukrainian military said it had shot down 37 cruise missiles and 29 drones, along with 11 Iskander missiles. One person was injured. Ukrainian Air Force spokesman Yuriy Ihnat said that ballistic missiles, including either S-300 or S-400 missiles were used. An air base in Khmelnytskyi was also struck. Five aircraft were reported to have been disabled while the runway was reported to have been damaged. Russian artillery and helicopters also launched attacks on settlements in Sumy Oblast throughout the day. The Russian defence ministry later said it struck air bases during those attacks.

In Donetsk Oblast, two civilians were killed by Russian shelling in Toretsk, while eight others were injured. Another person was killed by Russian shelling in Kozatske, Kherson Oblast. One person was killed and nine others injured by shelling in Synelnykove Raion in Dnipropetrovsk Oblast, while seven people were injured by shelling in Kupiansk Raion, in Kharkiv Oblast.

The Russian defence ministry claimed to have destroyed the Ukrainian Navy's "last operating" warship, the Yuri Olefirenko, in a missile strike in Odesa. Officials from the Ukrainian Navy declined to comment on the allegation.

In Russia's Belgorod Oblast, four people were reported to have been injured by Ukrainian shelling in border settlements.

A spokesman for the Ukrainian military's Operational Command East, which encompasses the Donbas, told Ukrainian television that Wagner mercenaries in Bakhmut were being replaced by the regular Russian military. He added that there were three clashes around the city in the past 24 hours. The Russians shelled Ukrainian positions 373 times and launched six air strikes. In response, Ukrainian forces killed 155 Russian soldiers and wounded 116.

President Putin signed a law authorizing elections to occur later in the year in Ukrainian territories that it annexed during its invasion, despite the prevailing declaration of martial law in those areas.

The Russian Interior Ministry placed US Senator Lindsey Graham on a wanted list following his remarks on 26 May to President Zelenskyy that appeared to show him praising the deaths of Russians during the conflict and continued US support to Ukraine. The Ukrainian presidency later released a full video of the interaction, showing that the comments were not linked. Senator Graham later clarified that he was praising Ukrainian resistance against Russia before saying that the arrest warrant was a "badge of honor" and challenged Russian authorities to try him in the International Criminal Court.

The Verkhovna Rada imposed sanctions against the Islamic Republic of Iran for supplying drones to Russia. The new regulations included a ban on exports of "military and dual-use goods" to the country and the "suspension of economic and financial obligations in favour" of its residents. The transit of Iranian goods and aircraft through Ukraine was also to be halted.

Mykhailo Podolyak, a senior adviser to President Volodymyr Zelenskyy, stated that Ukraine intensified attacks against Russian supply lines and that preparations for the major counter-attack were being finalized in different sectors of the front. He proposed that a demilitarised zone of 100–120 kilometers (62–75 miles) from the border with Ukraine should be established inside Russia as part of a post-war settlement.

Danish Prime Minister Mette Frederiksen announced that her government was to increase its military aid to Ukraine by $2.6 billion during 2023 and 2024.

=== 30 May ===
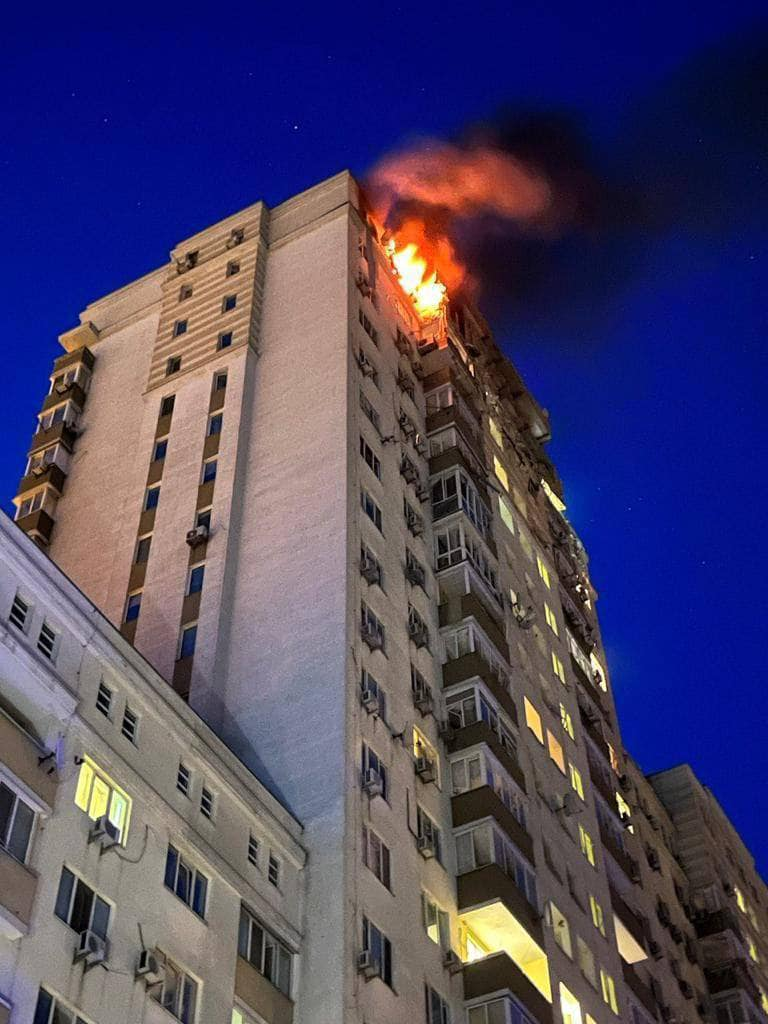
Residential building in Kyiv which caught fire due to falling of fragments of a downed drone

Kyiv was attacked by twenty Shahed drones according to Ukrainian officials. A high rise building was hit by debris starting a fire. One person was killed and four were wounded.

Moscow was attacked by at least eight drones, causing minor damage to several buildings according to the Russian ministry of defence. Three lost control due to electronic warfare and the other five were shot down by a Pantsir-S system. The Mayor of Moscow Sergei Sobyanin said that "two people had sought medical assistance". Russia accused Ukraine of responsibility, which a Ukrainian official denied but said that the country was "pleased" over the attack. One person was killed and two others were injured after purported Ukrainian shelling of a centre for displaced people in Belgorod Oblast.

The Russian Interior Ministry placed General Valerii Zaluzhnyi, commander of the Armed Forces of Ukraine, and Colonel General Oleksandr Syrskyi, commander of the Ukrainian Ground Forces, on its wanted list.

Russian Prime Minister Mikhail Mishustin said about 1.5 million people living in the Ukrainian territories annexed by Russia in 2022 had received Russian passports, adding that about 1.6 million people residents were receiving pensions, and about 1.5 million were receiving social benefits.

South Africa's leading opposition party, the Democratic Alliance, launched a court application to ensure the South African government detained Vladimir Putin and hand him over to the International Criminal Court for war crimes in Ukraine should he "set foot in South Africa." The move followed speculation on whether he would attend the BRICS summit to be held in the country in August, to which the government had granted prior diplomatic immunity to all attendees.

=== 31 May ===
One person was killed by Russian shelling in Vovchansk Raion in Kharkiv Oblast, while three people, including two children, were injured by Russian shelling in Kherson Oblast. One person was also killed by Russian shelling in Donetsk Oblast. Officials in the Russian-installed Luhansk People's Republic said that five people were killed and 19 others were injured after Ukrainian artillery hit a poultry farm.

The State Border Guard Service of Ukraine reported that Russian troops had blown up a road that links Ukraine's Chernihiv Oblast with Russia's Bryansk Oblast, saying that the incident occurred at the tripoint between Ukraine, Russia and Belarus.

Ukraine claimed that Russian-installed officials in occupied Luhansk were threatening to withhold the wages of workers who refused to open accounts at Russian banks.

The Russian defence ministry claimed its forces had pushed out Ukrainian forces from positions around Krasnohorivka and Yasynuvata in Donetsk Oblast.

A fire broke out at the Afipsky oil refinery in Russia's Krasnodar Krai. Veniamin Kondratyev, Governor of the region, blamed the fire on a Ukrainian drone strike. The fire was put out with minimal damage and no casualties. Another drone was reported to have crashed into the Ilsky refinery. The governor of Belgorod Oblast announced the beginning of evacuations of children from areas affected by Ukrainian shelling, saying that 300 children would be taken to Voronezh, about 250 km (160 mi) away, while another 1,000 children would be evacuated to other regions over the coming days. He also said two border settlements were shelled by Ukraine, injuring four.

The Russian Interior Ministry placed two former Ukrainian defence ministers and a former commander of the Armed Forces of Ukraine to its wanted list.

The Wagner Group's Yevgeny Prigozhin said he had asked prosecutors to investigate whether senior Russian defense officials had committed any "crime" before or during the war in Ukraine, without providing specific details.

Germany ordered the closure of four out of five Russian consulates in the country, in retaliation for the expulsion of German diplomatic staff from Russia and the closure of the German consulates in Kaliningrad, Yekaterinburg and Novosibirsk.

Ukrainian Prime Minister Denys Shmyhal said the country received $1.25 billion from the United States as a part of the World Bank’s Public Expenditures for Administrative Capacity Endurance (PEACE) project, saying that the funds would "be used to support the state budget, especially for social and humanitarian spending." The Pentagon announced an additional $300-million aid package to help bolster Ukrainian air defenses, particularly additional munitions for Patriot air defense systems.

== June 2023 ==
=== 1 June ===
Three people, including a mother and her child, were killed in a Russian air attack on Kyiv in the early hours of the day. The victims were from the Desnianskyi District. Reports said that the casualties were trying to access a locked bomb shelter when the attack occurred. Four people were detained in connection to the incident, namely a security guard, the director of a medical facility, his deputy and the first deputy of the district administration. A subsequent audit of Kyiv's bomb shelters found that nearly half of them were unfit for use or closed. Damage was also reported in the Dniprovskyi District. Ten Iskander missiles were intercepted according to the Ukrainian military.

In Russia's Belgorod Oblast, eight people were reported to have been injured by Ukrainian shelling in Shebekino. The regional governor, Vyacheslav Gladkov, claimed that Ukrainian forces used Grad rockets. Two others were injured in a drone attack in Belgorod city. The Russian defence ministry claimed it had repulsed three Ukrainian attacks on Belgorod, killed more than 50 Ukrainian soldiers and destroyed four armored vehicles. It said the attacks involved up to 70 "militants", five tanks, four armoured vehicles, seven pick-up trucks and a Kamaz truck.

The Ukrainian Ministry of Infrastructure said the Black Sea Grain Initiative had been halted again because Russia had blocked the registration of ships to all Ukrainian ports. The UN later confirmed that Russia was planning to limit registration of ships to the port of Pivdennyi until all parties agreed to unblock the transit of Russian ammonia.

The FSB said it had discovered an "intelligence action" that had compromised the phones of Russians as well as diplomats from Israel, Syria, China and NATO members and claimed that Apple had worked with US intelligence agencies such as the National Security Agency in compromising numerous iPhones. Apple did not comment on whether its products in Russia had been hacked but denied working with authorities to compromise its devices.

The Pentagon said that it would buy Elon Musk's Starlink satellite service for Ukraine to ensure the continued effectivity of communications in the country.

The US State Department said it was revoking the visas of Russian nuclear inspectors, denying pending applications for new monitors and canceling standard clearances for Russian aircraft to enter US airspace in retaliation for Russia's suspension of its participation in the New START treaty. It also said it would no longer notify Russia of any updates on the status or location of "treaty-accountable items" like missiles and launchers.

The Swiss National Council voted down, 98–75, a parliamentary initiative put forward by a committee that would have specifically authorized the transfer of Swiss-made arms to Ukraine. Its opponents claimed the proposal was a violation of the country's longstanding policy of neutrality.

=== 2 June ===
Ukrainian officials said that during the morning two waves of air attacks were aimed at Kyiv. The Ukrainian military said they shot down 15 Russian cruise missiles and 21 drones in and around the capital overnight, with two people injured by falling debris. Five private homes were also damage according to Ukrainian officials. Another missile attack later was reported later in the day, with the Ukrainian military saying that they had intercepted all 15 cruise missiles and 18 drones launched by Russian forces and about 30 other "hostile objects". Two people were killed and four others were injured by Russian bombing in Kivsharivka, Kharkiv Oblast, while the same numbers were reported in a Russian attack on a village in Zaporizhzhia Oblast.

Officials of the Russian-installed Donetsk People's Republic said that three people were reportedly killed and four others wounded by Ukrainian shelling in Makiivka. Officials in occupied Zaporizhzhia Oblast claimed that Ukrainian artillery struck a hospital camp and wounded nine people in a separate incident in Berdiansk. A Russian sympathizer and mayoral candidate in Russian-organized local elections was killed by a car bomb in Mykhailivka.

The Russian Defence Ministry announced the deployment of Chechen "Akhmat" special forces to the frontlines in Mariinka, Donetsk Oblast for an offensive. Yevgeny Prigozhin said that 99% of his Wagner fighters had pulled out from Bakhmut ahead of its formal turnover to the Russian military on 5 June. He also accused the Russian military of laying mines targeting his personnel as they retreated.

The governor of Russia's Bryansk Oblast claimed that Ukrainian forces shelled a village along the international border, destroying a house. Two people were reportedly killed and two others injured when Ukrainian forces shelled a road in Maslova Pristan, Belgorod Oblast, while the Freedom of Russia Legion claimed responsibility for an attack on the village of Novaya Tavolzhanka and claimed that Russian government forces had killed two civilians after mistaking their vehicle for that of the legion. Long-range drones hit two towns in Smolensk Oblast, while an explosion was reported in a forest in Kaluga Oblast. Officials claimed that buildings were damaged in Bryansk and Kursk by Ukrainian shelling and a nighttime drone attack.

Russian Deputy Prime Minister Viktoria Abramchenko said Russia sowed winter crops for the year's harvest in the territories it annexed during the invasion, providing state support worth 3 billion rubles ($37.1 million) to farmers in the occupied regions and harvesting grain, beans and rapeseed on 1.3 million hectares.

The Chairman of the US Joint Chiefs of Staff General Mark Milley announced that Ukrainian soldiers had begun training in the use of M1 Abrams tanks pledged to Ukraine by the West.

The United States approached Japan for supplies of TNT to be used in 155 mm caliber shells for Ukraine. According to Reuters, the Japanese government allowed the US government to purchase industrial TNT as it is not a military product.

=== 3 June ===
A missile strike on Dnipro killed a two-year-old girl and wounded 22 people after it hit a two-story building. Five of them were reportedly children, seventeen people were hospitalized and several were believed to have been trapped under the rubble.

Belgorod Oblast Governor Vyacheslav Gladkov said that two people were killed by Ukrainian shelling.

=== 4 June ===
During the early hours of the morning Ukrainian officials reported that air defence systems had repelled a missile attack on Kyiv. However, two missiles struck an airfield near Kropyvnytskyi. Two drones were reported to have struck infrastructure in Sumy Oblast. Explosions were also reported in Sumy and in the occupied cities of Melitopol and Berdiansk.

Russia claimed to have fought off a "large-scale offensive" by Ukraine in the southern part of Donetsk Oblast, killing 250 soldiers and destroying 16 tanks, three infantry fighting vehicles and 21 armoured combat vehicles.

The Russian Volunteer Corps and the Freedom of Russia Legion claimed to have captured Russian soldiers after launching another incursion into Belgorod Oblast. The regional governor, Vyacheslav Gladkov, acknowledged their claims and promised to meet them to swap the soldiers. However, the groups claimed that he failed to show up, forcing them to hand over their captives to Ukraine. A video was released on Telegram by the RVC showed some ten to twelve Russian soldiers, and two others in a hospital bed.

=== 5 June ===
Ukrainian forces were reported to be advancing towards Bakhmut, with the Wagner Group's Yevgeny Prigozhin confirming that Ukrainian soldiers had retaken part of the settlement of Berkhivka, north of the city. Hanna Malyar, Ukrainian Deputy Defence Minister said that 'offensive actions' were underway in "some areas" in eastern Ukraine, adding that Ukrainian troops gained from 200 to 1,600 meters (660 to 5,250 ft) in Orikhovo-Vasulivka and Paraskoviivka, while in Ivanivske and Klishchiivka they advanced between 100 and 700 meters (330 and 2,300 ft). The Russian defense ministry said it was holding back attacks by Ukrainian forces near the settlements of Novodonetske and Oktyabrske.

The Ukrainian government accused Russia of violating the terms of the Black Sea Grain Initiative by registering two vessels that declared their participation in the deal the same day, adding it went against accepted vessel inspection rules that required priority inspection and registration of longer-standing ships.

The Wagner Group said it had detained a regular Russian military officer who opened fire on one of their vehicles near Bakhmut. The officer was said to have disliked the group and attacked the vehicle while intoxicated. The officer was later identified as Lt. Col. Roman Venevitin, who was later released and subsequently accused the group of stoking "anarchy" on Russia's frontlines by stealing arms, forcing mobilized soldiers to sign contracts with the group and attempting to extort weapons from the defence ministry.

In Russia, an energy facility in Belgorod Oblast was reportedly set on fire by a drone attack, while two drones crashed into a road in Kaluga Oblast but did not explode. A radio address purportedly made by President Putin was broadcast in Rostov, Belgorod and Voronezh Oblasts, all of which border Ukraine, which claimed the Ukrainian army had entered Russia, adding that martial law had been declared and a nationwide military mobilization had begun while telling residents to evacuate into the interior. The message was broadcast by radio stations in those regions before the Kremlin said it was a hoax caused by a hacking.

Belgian officials launched an investigation into the possible use of Belgian-made weapons by pro-Ukrainian Russian partisans in Belgorod, some of whom were seen using FN SCAR assault rifles. The Russian Foreign Ministry summoned the Belgian ambassador in protest over the issue.

The EU extended restrictions on imports of Ukrainian agricultural products imposed by Bulgaria, Hungary, Poland, Romania and Slovakia seeking to protect their farmers to 15 September. It also sanctioned nine Russian officials, including a deputy justice minister, judges and a prison official, over the persecution and jailing of Kremlin critic and antiwar activist Vladimir Kara-Murza.

=== 6 June ===
==== Destruction of the Kakhovka Dam ====
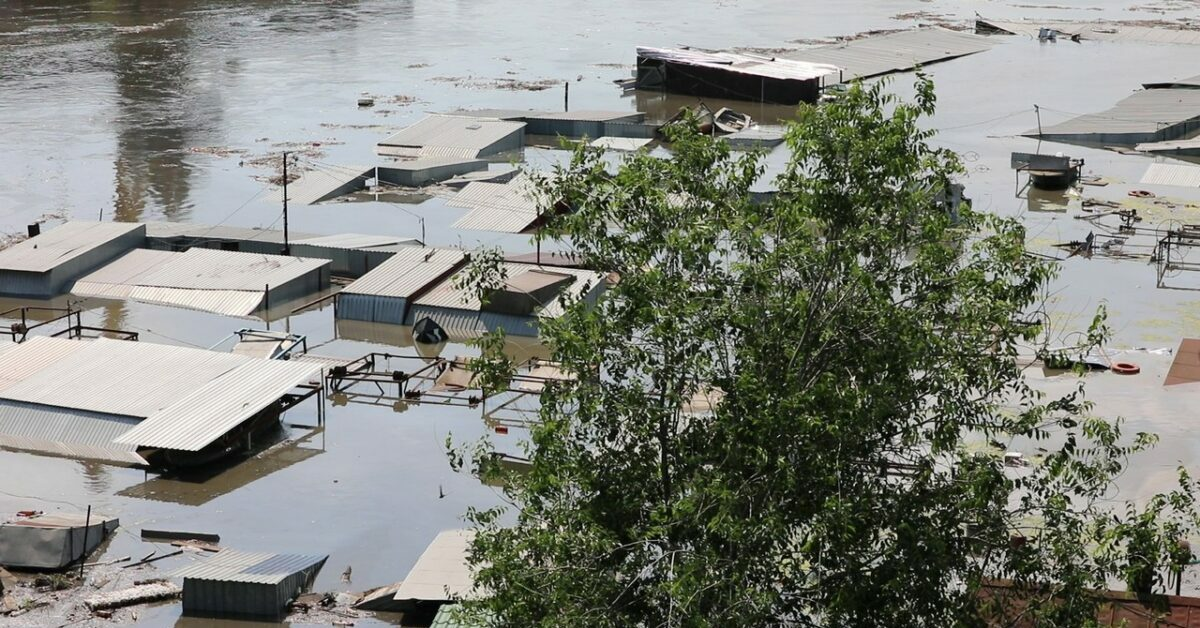
Flood in Kherson region after the destruction of the Kakhovka Dam

Ukraine said Russian forces had blown up the Kakhovka Dam along the Dnipro River in Kherson Oblast, releasing a large amount of water, while the Russian-installed mayor of Nova Kakhovka blamed the destruction on Ukrainian shelling but said only the upper part of the structure was damaged. An assessment by Ukraine's state hydropower agency, Ukrhydroenergo, determined that the dam was "totally destroyed" after a blast from inside the engine room and could not be restored, while Ukrainian officials claimed Russia destroyed the dam "in a panic" to slow down its upcoming offensive.

The Ukrainian government issued an evacuation order for ten villages downstream from the dam as well as parts of Kherson city. The governor of Kherson Oblast, Oleksandr Prokudin, told Ukrainian TV that eight villages had been flooded, and that evacuations by bus and train were ongoing for 16,000 residents in affected areas. The Ukrainian Interior Ministry later said 24 villages had been flooded, while President Zelenskyy said up to 80 villages were at risk of flooding. Around 40,000 people were in need of evacuation - 17,000 people in the Ukrainian-controlled right bank of the Dnipro and 25,000 on the Russian-controlled left bank, with Ukraine saying it had evacuated 1,000 people. 150 tonnes of engine oil were reported to have spilled into the Dnipro after the collapse. One person was killed and two Ukrainian policemen were wounded by Russian shelling in the area.

In Nova Kakhovka, 900 people were evacuated, 600 houses were reported to have been flooded and a state of emergency was declared by Russian authorities as water levels rose to over 11 meters (36 feet). The city's Kazkova Dibrova zoo lost all its 300 animals in the floods, while the town of Oleshky was reported to have been heavily flooded. Seven people were reported missing in Nova Kakhovka, while about 100 residents were reported to have been trapped. Thousands of animals were reported to have been killed in the Nizhnedniprovsky National Nature Park. At least eight people were reported to have died due to the resulting floods, while about 600 square kilometres (230 square miles) of the region was underwater, 68 percent of which was on the Russian-controlled side. Over the following days, the death toll rose to a total of 58.

==== Other events ====
20 Russian missiles were reportedly shot down over Kyiv during an early morning attack. The governor of Kharkiv Oblast said that Russian forces repeatedly fired at an ammonia pipeline owned by TogliattiAzot which runs from Tolyatti in Russia to the Ukrainian port of Odesa, in a section located south of Masiutivka, causing an ammonia leak The Russian Defence Ministry claimed that it was caused by "Ukrainian saboteurs".

Russian Defense Minister Sergei Shoigu said that 71 Russian soldiers had been killed following attacks by Ukrainian forces along the frontlines in recent days, adding that 15 Russian tanks and nine armoured vehicles were also damaged by Ukrainian troops.

In Russia, the border district of Shebekino in Belgorod Oblast came under renewed Ukrainian shelling.

Australia was considering whether to provide Ukraine with 41 retired F/A-18 Hornets from the Royal Australian Air Force, with discussions ongoing between the Australian and United States governments according to the Australian Financial Review.

According to the Washington Post, European intelligence informed back in June 2022 the CIA and President Biden that Ukraine had a plan to attack the Nord Stream 2 pipeline using six divers who answered directly to Ukrainian Armed Forces Commanding General Valerii Zaluzhnyi.

=== 7 June ===
Two people were reported to have been killed in a Russian drone strike on a house in Sumy Oblast.

The Ukrainian Defence Ministry announced its forces had advanced from 200 to 1,100 metres around Bakhmut.

In Russia, there was continued shelling of Belgorod Oblast, including in Shebekino district.

Russia announced the arrest of a resident of Primorsky Krai for gathering information about law enforcement facilities and military infrastructure for Ukraine.

== See also ==
- Timeline of the Russian invasion of Ukraine (8 June 2023 – 31 August 2023)
- Outline of the Russo-Ukrainian War
- Bibliography of Ukrainian history
