= Timeline of the Russo-Ukrainian war (1 January 2026 – 31 May 2026) =

Timeline of the Russo-Ukrainian war (2022–present)
- Prelude; (up to 23 February 2022); Initial invasion; (24 February – 7 April 2022); Southeastern front; (8 April – 28 August 2022); 2022 Ukrainian counteroffensives; (29 August – 11 November 2022); Second stalemate; (12 November 2022 – 7 June 2023); 2023 Ukrainian counteroffensive; (8 June 2023 – 31 August 2023); 2023 Ukrainian counteroffensive, cont.; (1 September – 30 November 2023); 2023–2024 winter campaigns; (1 December 2023 – 31 March 2024); 2024 spring and summer campaigns; (1 April – 31 July 2024); 2024 summer–autumn offensives; (1 August – 31 December 2024); 2025 winter–spring offensives; (1 January 2025 – 31 May 2025); 2025 summer offensives; (1 June 2025 – 31 August 2025); 2025 autumn–winter offensives; (1 September 2025 – 31 December 2025); 2026 winter–spring offensives; (1 January 2026 – 31 May 2026); 2026 summer offensives; (1 June 2026 – 31 August 2026); 2026 autumn–winter offensives; (1 September 2026 – present)

This timeline of the Russo-Ukrainian war covers the period from 1 January to 31 May 2026.

== January 2026 ==
=== 1 January ===
The Russian-installed governor of Kherson Oblast, Vladimir Saldo, said 28 people were killed while several others were injured in a Ukrainian drone strike on hotels and restaurants in Khorly. Saldo accused Ukraine of deliberately targeting civilians during New Year's Eve celebrations.

Multiple animals were killed and injured in a Russian airstrike on the Feldman Ecopark in Lisne, Kharkiv Oblast.

Drones were reported over Moscow, shutting down local airports. They were believed to be timed to interfere with President Putin's New Year's speech. Ukrainian drones struck the Ilsky oil refinery in Krasnodar Krai and various sites in occupied Donetsk Oblast.

Germany delivered two Patriot missile systems to Ukraine.

=== 2 January ===
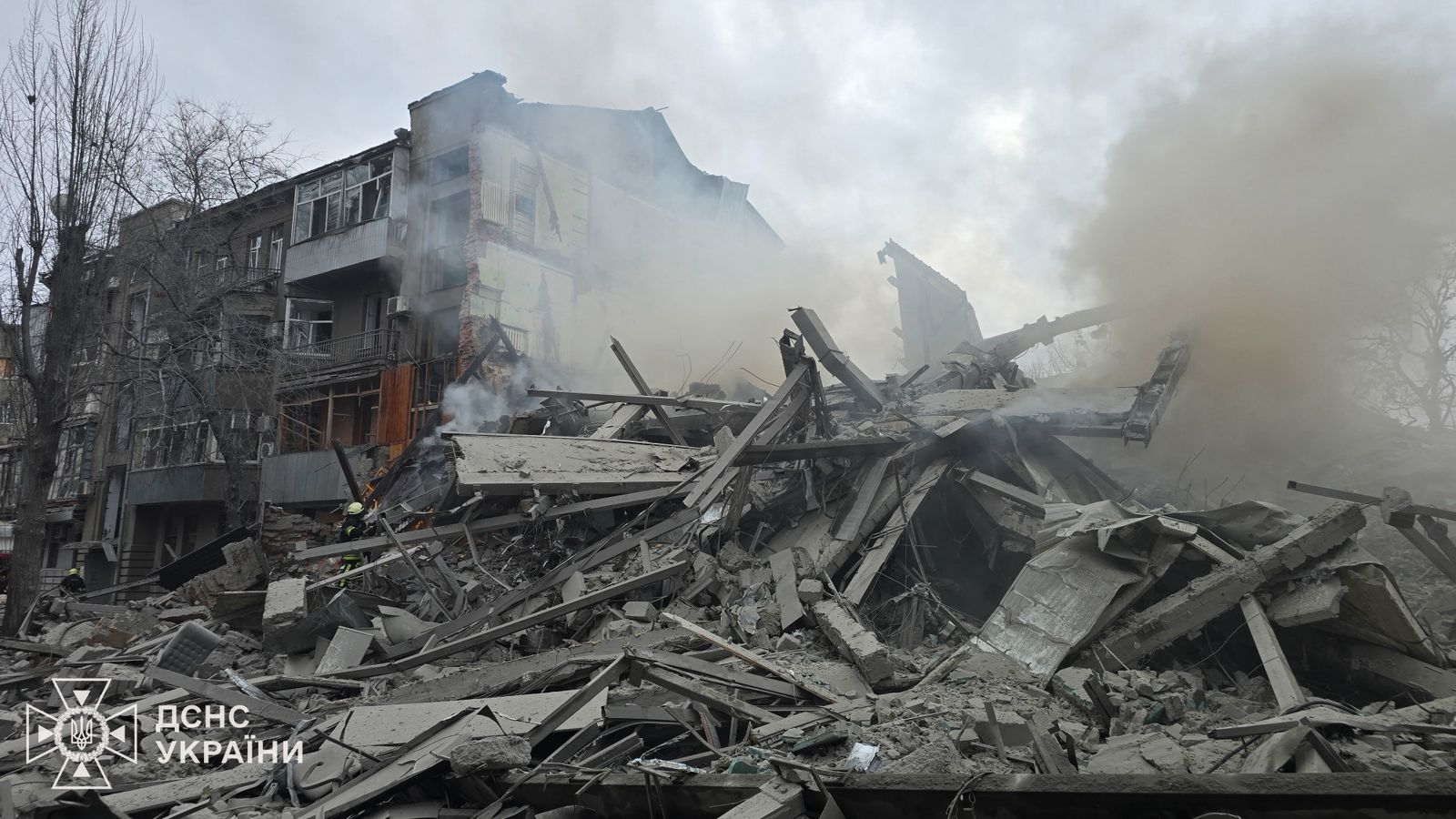
An apartment building in Kharkiv after the attack

Six people were killed in a Russian missile attack on Kharkiv.

Kyrylo Budanov, head of the HUR, was appointed to replace Andriy Yermak as head of the Office of the President of Ukraine.

Ukrainian drones struck the Novokuybyshevsk Oil Refinery in Samara Oblast.

Geolocated footage showed Ukrainian forces operating in Drobysheve near Lyman, an area Russian forces claimed they controlled. Geolocated footage showed Russian advances in the city of Kostiantynivka and northwest of the village of Oleksandro-Kalynove; and Russian advances towards Hryhorivka and Prymorske near the Konka river.

=== 3 January ===
In Dnipropetrovsk and Zaporizhzhia oblasts, 44 settlements were subjected to mandatory evacuation due to the deteriorating "security situation", affecting some 3,000 children and families.

Geolocated footage indicated Russian advances in central Sotnytskyi Kozachok, northwest of Kharkiv; and northeast of Orikhovo-Vasylivka near the E40 highway.

=== 4 January ===
The Russian Defense Ministry claimed Russian forces seized Podoly near Kupiansk. The Head of Chechnya, Ramzan Kadyrov, claimed the Chechen 270th Akhmat-Kavkaz Motorized Rifle Regiment took the village of Bilohiria, southeast of Orikhiv.

Russian authorities said two people were killed in Ukrainian drone strikes on Belgorod and Kursk oblasts.

Two people, including a National Guard of Ukraine officer, were injured in a car bombing in Obolonskyi District in Kyiv. A suspect was arrested.

The mayor of Moscow claimed around 28 drones approached the city, leading to the cancellation of more than 200 flights as Vnukovo, Domodedovo, and Zhukovsky airports were closed. Ukrainian drones struck the Energia enterprise at Yelets in Lipetsk Oblast. The plant makes batteries for various Russian weapon systems.

President Zelenskyy dismissed Lieutenant General Serhii Deineko as head of the State Border Guard Service of Ukraine, and replaced him on an interim basis with his deputy Valeriy Vavrynyuk.

=== 5 January ===
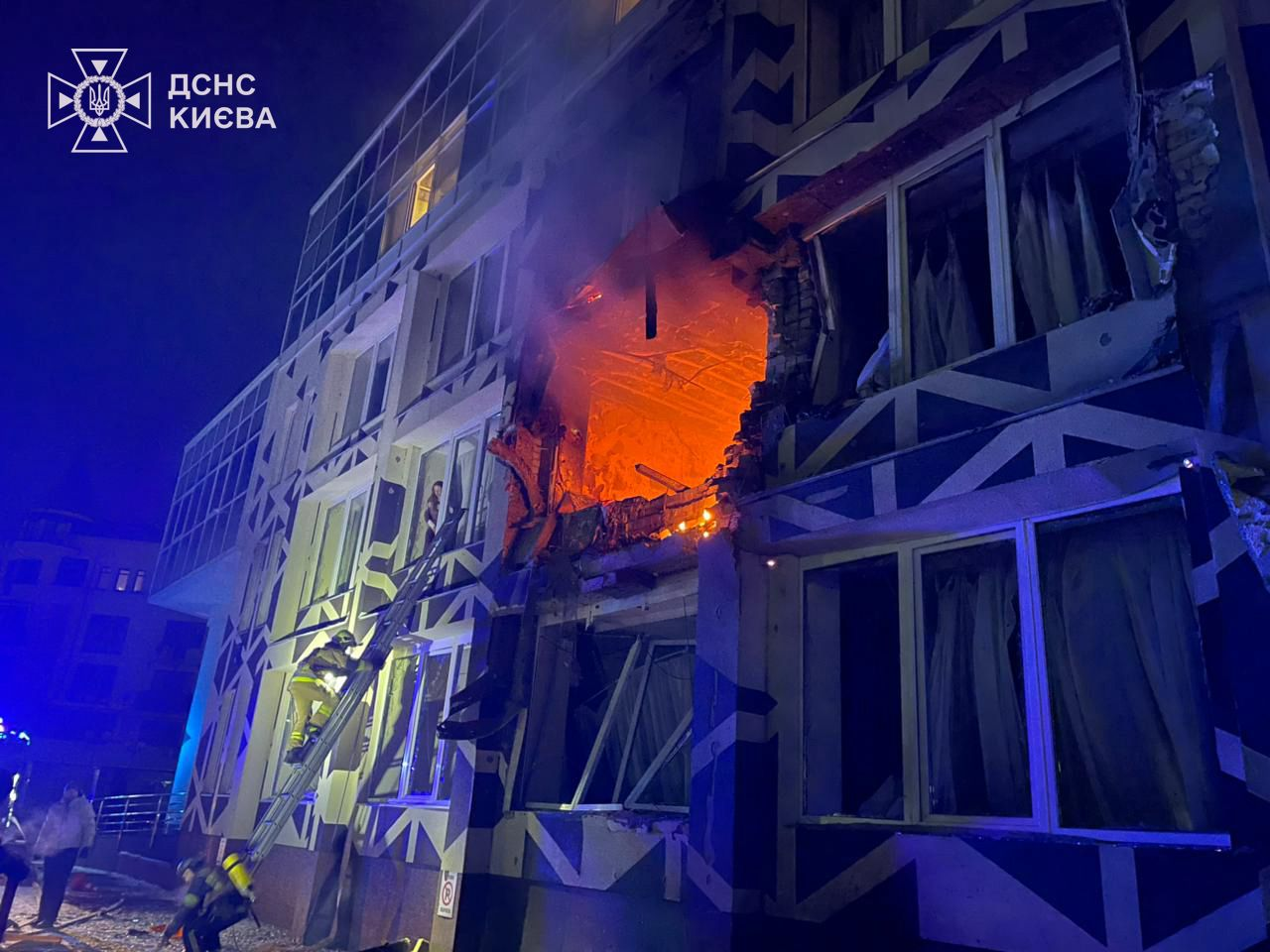
Clinic in Kyiv after the attack

Vasyl Malyuk was forced to resign as head of the SBU by President Zelenskyy.

One person was killed in a Russian drone attack on Kyiv.

Russia claimed to have taken Hrabovske in Sumy Oblast.

Ukrainian drones destroyed a Russian 9S32M1 radar of an S-300V missile system in Donetsk Oblast.

The Russian 136th Separate Guards Motor Rifle Brigade’s commander, Colonel Eric Selimov, was killed in a car crash in Alchevsk Raion in Luhansk Oblast.

Ukrainian military observer Kostyantyn Mashovets reported Russian advances north of Yablunivka across Highway H20, and also in southeast Kostiantynivka.

=== 6 January ===
A Russian milblogger claimed Russian forces took the village of Pishchane, southeast of Kupiansk.

Ukrainian drones struck targets in Penza and Sterlitamak. Ukrainian drones struck Yaroslavl, with Yaroslavl Oil Refinery believed to be the target. Ukrainian forces attacked the 100th Arsenal of the Main Missile and Artillery Directorate located in Neya in Kostroma Oblast, which supplied ammunitions storages in the Central and Moscow Military Districts. Ukrainian forces also attacked an oil depot in Usmansky District in Lipetsk Oblast.

=== 7 January ===
Ukrainian drones set fire to the Oskolneftesnab oil depot near Kotel in Belgorod Oblast. A warehouse belonging to the Russian 20th Motor Rifle Division in Donetsk was also struck.

Russian forces struck Chornomorsk and Pivdennyi ports in Odesa Oblast, killing one person and injuring five more.

Geolocated footage showed Russian advances in north Yunakivka and Ukrainian advances in Vovchanski Khutory.

=== 8 January ===
Russian forces struck Lviv with an Oreshnik missile.

DeepstateUA reported Russian forces took the villages of Andriivka in Sumy Oblast and Novomarkove in Donetsk Oblast. The Ukrainian Kursk Group of Forces denied the claim of Andriivka being captured.

A Russian shadow fleet oil tanker Elbus was struck by a drone off the coast of Turkey. According to ASTRA, the tanker was headed to Novorossiysk and sustained damage, but no crew members were injured. The ship was towed to İnebolu for inspections.

The pro-Ukrainian Freedom of Russia Legion set fire to some 15 trucks at the village of Kochegury in Belgorod Oblast.

Geolocated footage showed Ukrainian forces continued to operate in Zahryzove near Borova, an area Russian forces claimed they controlled, while the Russian Defense Ministry claimed Russian forces took the village of Bratske, south of Pokrovske.

=== 9 January ===
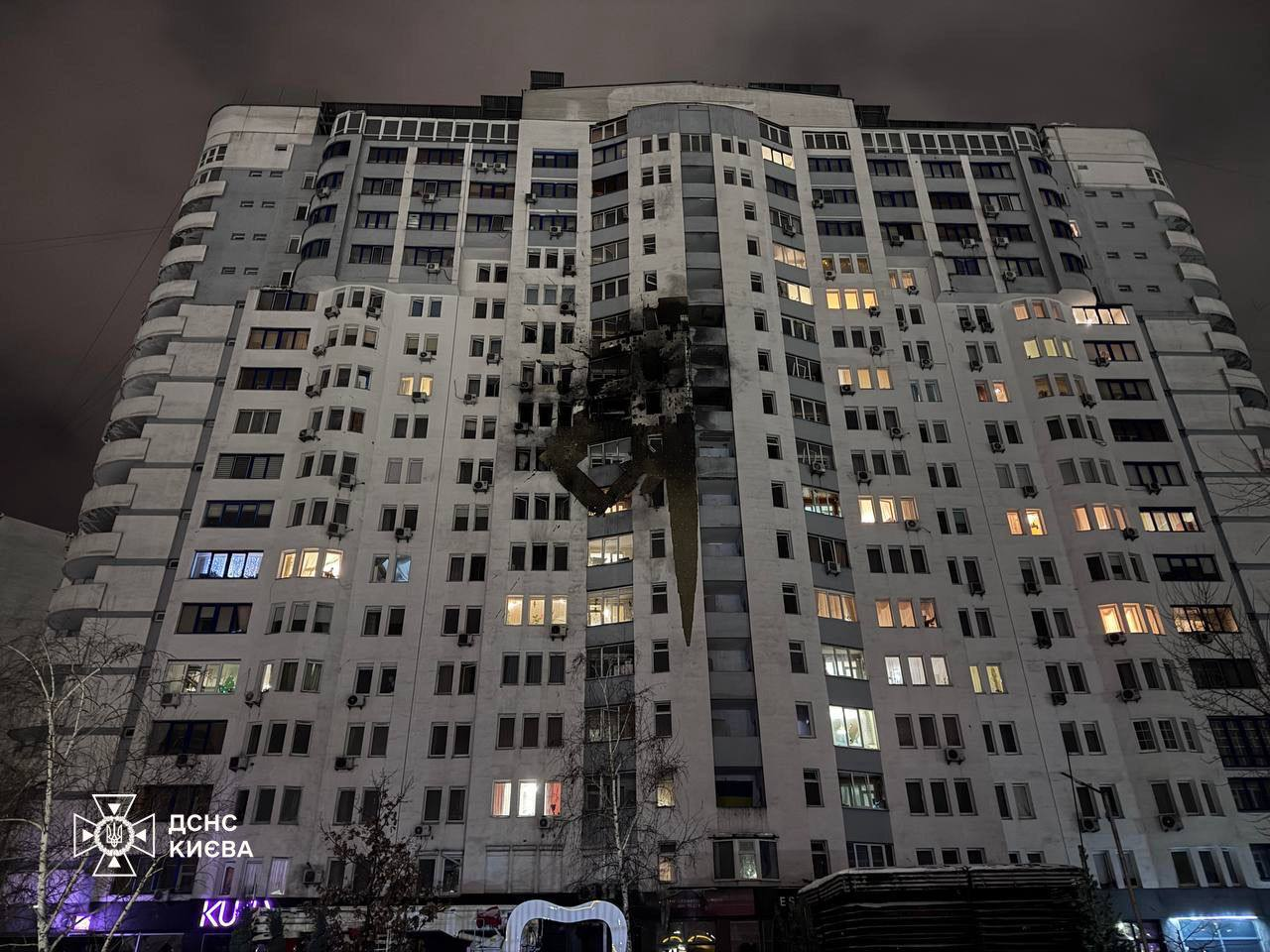
Apartment building in Kyiv after the attack

Four people were killed in Russian airstrikes on Kyiv that also damaged the building housing the Qatari embassy.

Ukrainian FP-2 drones struck a fuel train in Crimea and a military arms depot in Donetsk. Ukrainian missiles struck the thermal power plants at Belgorod and Oryol, resulting in blackouts.

The Minister for Development of Communities and Territories Oleksiy Kuleba, said Russian forces struck a vessel en route to Chornomorsk, and another vessel near Odesa, killing a Syrian national.

Russian milbloggers claimed Russian forces took the village of Tyshchenkivka, northwest of Kupiansk. Geolocated footage showed Russian advances in west Novomarkove, and northwest of Stupochky and Ivanopillia, all located east of Kostiantynivka. Geolocated footage showed Ukrainian advances west of Pryluky and Russian infiltration in Zelene, both located north of Huliaipole. Geolocated footage showed Ukrainian forces continued to operate in central Stepnohirsk, an area Russian forces claimed they controlled.

The SBU arrested two GRU agents who were accused of assessing the effectiveness of the Oreshnik missile strike on Lviv.

=== 10 January ===
Ukrainian drones set fire to the Volgograd oil refinery. A drone warehouse in Zaporizhzhia Oblast, attached to the Russian 19th Motor Rifle Division, was attacked, as was an "UAV control point" near Pokrovsk. In Donetsk Oblast, a command post in Kurakhivka and a grouping of the 76th Guards Air Assault Division in Hirnyk were both attacked. Voronezh was attacked by 70 drones and a Neptune missile according to the SHOT Telegram channel, while the Russian MoD claimed all were shot down. The air defense and 20 explosions caused by the drones lasted for an hour.

Iraq established a commission to prevent Iraqi nationals from going to Russia to fight in Ukraine.

Russian milbloggers claimed Russian forces seized Viroliubivka, north of Kostiantynivka, and the villages of Dobropillia and Sviatopetrivka, both located north of Huliaipole.

=== 11 January ===
Voronezh Oblast Governor Alexander Gusev claimed a woman died and three were injured by a drone attack on Voronezh city. The Governor claimed several administrative buildings, a secondary school, ten private houses and ten apartment blocks were damaged in “one of the heaviest drone attacks since the start of the special military operation.”

Russia deployed a new jet powered drone called the Geran-5, which carries a 90 kg (200 lb) warhead, has a strike range of 1,000 km (620 mi) and can be air launched by Su-25 aircraft according to HUR.

Ukrainian drones struck three Lukoil drilling rigs on the Caspian Sea (the V. Filanovsky, Yuri Korchagin, and Valeri Graifer), a Buk-M3 missile system in Luhansk Oblast, and a Russian army warehouse in Kherson Oblast.

Britain said it will develop a new ballistic missile for the defense of Ukraine.

Geolocated footage showed Russian infiltration in south Podoly near Kupiansk, and Russian advances in east Kostiantynivka, and in west Ridkodub near Borova.

=== 12 January ===
Ukrainian drones struck the Novocherkassk Thermal Power Plant in Novocherkassk, Rostov Oblast, causing a power outage in the region.

Russian forces struck energy infrastructure in Odesa Oblast, causing significant damage and leaving 33,500 consumers without electricity. Russian forces also struck two vessels near Odesa Oblast, injuring one person.

The Russian defense ministry claimed Russian forces took Novoboikivske village, east of Stepnohirsk, in Zaporizhzhia Oblast.

=== 13 January ===
Four people were killed in a Russian missile attack in Kharkiv.

The SBU said it carried out an attack on a Russian UAV factory in Taganrog in cooperation with the Ukrainian Navy.

Three Greek-owned tankers, the Delta Harmony, the Matilda and the Delta Supreme, were attacked and damaged by unknown maritime drones en route to the Caspian Pipeline Consortium at Novorossiysk.

A Russian source confirmed the Ukrainian recapture of Kurylivka and Kucherivka, Ukrainian control of Petropavlivka, and Ukrainian advances in west and east Podoly; all near Kupyansk. Geolocated footage confirmed Russian advances east of Nova Kruhliakivka, northeast of Borova.

=== 14 January ===
A Russian air defence missile accidentally struck an apartment block in Rostov-on-Don, starting a fire. Mayor Alexander Skryabin blamed the fire on "Ukrainian drone debris." The city was targeted by Ukrainian drones and missiles with its fuel storage tank reportedly ablaze. The Governor of Rostov Oblast, Yury Slyusar, claimed one person was killed and five were injured, including a four-year-old, by falling drone debris. The Governor of Belgorod Oblast claimed two people were killed in drone strikes.

The Russian defense ministry claimed Russian forces crossed the international border into Sumy Oblast and took the village of Komarivka.

President Zelenskyy declared a state of emergency in the Ukrainian energy sector due to Russian attacks and adverse winter conditions.

=== 15 January ===
Ukrainian drones set fire to the Nevinnomyssk Azot chemical plant in Nevinnomyssk, Stavropol Oblast. The plant made ingredients for explosives such as TNT and RDX used by the Russian military. This marked the fifth time the plant was struck since June 2025.

The mayor of Kharkiv, Ihor Terekhov, claimed a major critical energy infrastructure facility was destroyed by a Russian strike.

Russian forces struck the port of Chornomorsk, damaging a docked vessel.

DeepstateUA reported that Russian forces took the village of Krasnohirske in Zaporizhzhia Oblast.

=== 16 January ===
A Ukrainian drone struck a high-rise building in Ryazan, damaging two apartments and injuring two people. Drone debris also struck an "industrial enterprise" according to Ryazan Governor Pavel Malkov.

Geolocated footage published on January 16 confirmed Russia's control over Dobropillia. The ISW assessed that Russian forces also took Varvarivka; both are located north of Huliaipole. Russian milbloggers claimed that Russian forces took the villages of Pavlivka near Stepnohirsk, and Kruhle in Kharkiv Oblast near the international border. The Russian defense ministry claimed that Russian forces took the villages of Zakitne near Siversk and Olenokostiantynivka near Huliaipole.

=== 17 January ===
The Russian defense ministry claimed that Russian forces took the village of Pryvillia, south of Rai-Oleksandrivka, Donetsk Oblast.

=== 18 January ===
Russian milbloggers claimed that Russian forces took the villages of Ozerne, near Lyman and Novyi Donbas, east of Dobropillia.

Ukrainian drones strikes on electricity infrastructure in Russian-occupied Ukraine left over 200,000 households in Zaporizhzhia Oblast without power, according to Russian occupation officials.

The container ship Aurelia was struck by a drone some 80-90 nautical miles at sea, after its departure from the Russian port of Novorossiysk. The strike severely damaged several containers but did not damage the ship or injury to crew. It stopped at the Turkish port of Samsun to have the damaged containers removed.

=== 19 January ===
Russian forces launched three airstrikes on Kharkiv's Slobidskyi District, killing one person and injuring 11 more.

The Ukrainian military said it had carried out an attack that destroyed a Russian drone warehouse in Novokrasnianka, Luhansk Oblast.

The SBU captured a Russian officer accused of executing nine Ukrainian POWs in Kursk Oblast in 2024.

=== 20 January ===
The DTEK Energot power plant in Belgorod was set on fire by a drone and missile attack but without interruption to power supplies. In Oryol the local thermal power plant was struck by drones resulting in some 10 explosions with blackouts in parts of the city.

=== 21 January ===
Ukrainian drones struck Adygea; the head of the republic, Murat Kumpilov claimed that one person was killed and 13 people, including two children, were injured after a drone was detected in Novaya Adygea, Takhtamukaysky District. A fire broke out at an apartment building and a parking lot. However Telegram channel ASTRA said "debris (was) consistent with an air defense interceptor". A refinery caught fire in Afipsky, Krasnodar Krai. In the evening, another drone strike on an oil terminal near Volna, Krasnodar Krai, killed three people.

Japan announced $6 billion in "humanitarian and technical support" aid for Ukraine, largely for generators and other equipment used for electrical systems such as transformers.

The State Investigation Bureau (DBR) arrested a Ukrainian military officer in Sumy Oblast on "suspicion of abusing and torturing subordinates" and threatening to shoot soldiers who failed to follow his orders.

The Second Western District Military Court in Moscow sentenced Uzbek national Akhmadzhon Kurbonov to life imprisonment for the assassination of Lieutenant General Igor Kirillov in 2024, which Russia blamed on a Ukrainian national.

=== 22 January ===
The Ukrainian military said it had carried out strikes on three radar stations in Crimea, a drone storage facility in Novohryhorivka, Kherson Oblast, and other Russian military facilities in Selydove and Debaltseve in Donetsk Oblast.

In Moscow, the Second Western District Military Court formally acknowledged that the Russian cruiser Moskva was sunk by a Ukrainian missile, and accused Andrii Shubin, then commander of the 406th Artillery Brigade of the Ukrainian Navy, of giving the orders that led to the sinking of the Moskva. Updated casualties were listed as 20 crew members killed, 24 injured and eight missing. Shubin was also accused of destroying the frigate Admiral Essen in April 2022, for which the court demanded 2.2 billion rubles (approximately $28.4 million) in damages. Shubin was sentenced to life imprisonment in absentia for terrorism charges related to the sinking.

=== 23 January ===
The Penzanefteprodukt oil depot in Penza was set on fire by a Ukrainian drone attack, while a house was set on fire in Voronezh Oblast according to the local governor, Oleg Melnichenko.

The Russian Ministry of Defense and Russian milbloggers claimed that Russian forces took the village of Symynivka near Vovchansk. A Russian milblogger claimed that Russian forces took the villages of Novoselivka, Vorone, Sosnivka, and Orestopil, all southeast of Oleksandrivka, Dnipropetrovsk Oblast.

=== 24 January ===
According to the regional governor Vyacheslav Gladkov, Belgorod Oblast suffered its "most massive" attack that involved that HIMARS, damaging electrical infrastructure, a utility building, a car park and homes in the village of Tavrovo. Unidentified drones also struck Taganrog in Rostov Oblast, with the city losing power after explosions and fires were reported by locals with a transformer failing. Explosions were also reported in Oryol and Bryansk Oblast.

A Russian drone attack damaged two buildings of the Kyiv Pechersk Lavra, the first time the complex sustained war-related damage since World War II.

=== 26 January ===
An oil refinery in Slavyansk-on-Kuban was attacked by Ukrainian drones with at least one oil storage tank being set on fire. The Novokuybyshevsk Oil Refinery in Samara Oblast was also attacked.

=== 27 January ===
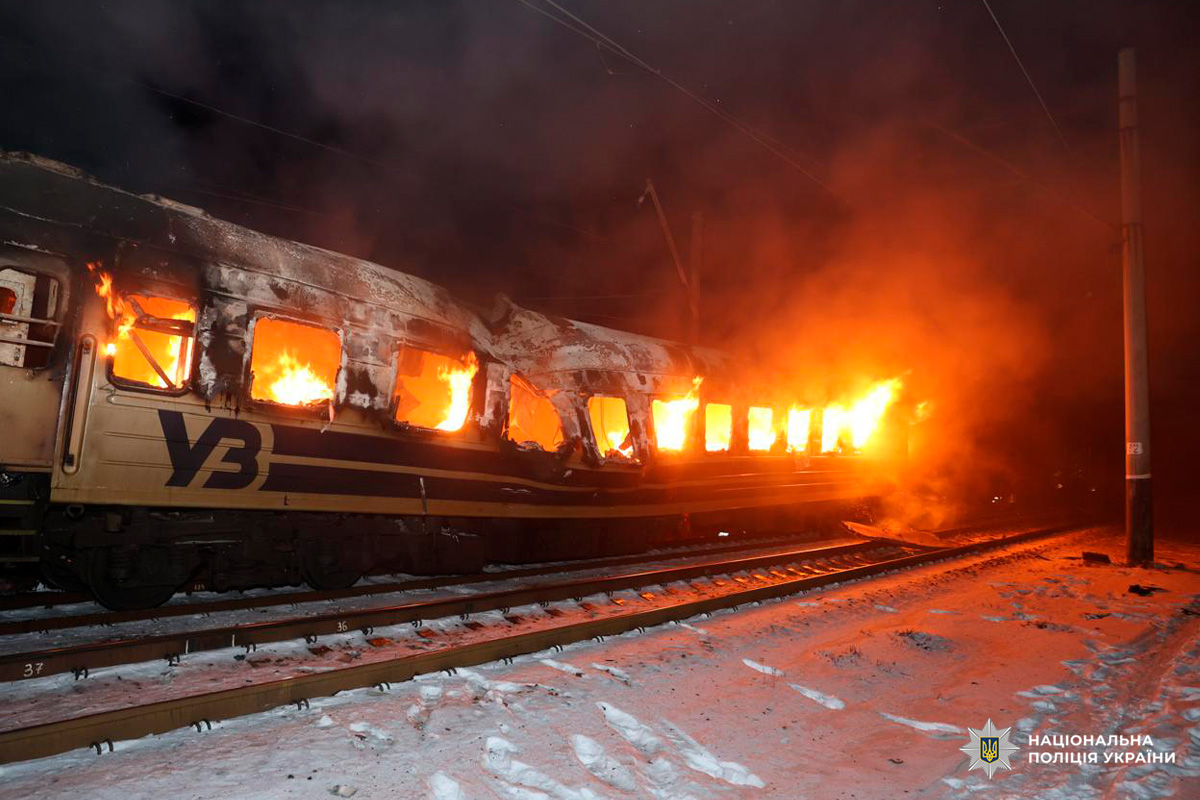
Train in Kharkiv Oblast after Shahed drone strike

Three people were killed in a Russian drone attack on Odesa. Two others were killed in a separate attack in Sloviansk, while a drone strike on a train in Kharkiv Oblast killed six. Additional strikes killed two people in Zaporizhzhia and Kherson oblasts.

=== 28 January ===
Two people were killed in a Russian air attack on Bilohorodka, Kyiv Oblast.

Atesh partisans claimed to have set fire to an electrical substation in Izhevsk, Udmurtia, cutting electricity to the BUMMASH metallurgical plant.

Ukrainian forces struck the Khokholskaya oil depot in Voronezh Oblast with thick smoke being spotted over the depot. Ukrainian forces struck Russian soldiers in Kolotilovka, Belgorod Oblast. Other groupings of Russian soldiers were attacked in Velyka Novosilka, Shakhove, and Hryhoriivka, Donetsk Oblast. A UAV control center near Velyka Novosilka and battalion command post near Berezove, both in Russian-occupied Dnipropetrovsk Oblast was attacked as was an ammunition depot in Nyzhnia Duvanka, Russian-occupied Luhansk Oblast.

Ukrainian officials claimed that Russian forces lost a Su-34 and a Su-30, without providing further details. On social media a Su-34 was reported destroyed along with its crew.

=== 29 January ===
Three people were killed in a Russian drone strike in Zaporizhzhia Oblast.

The bodies of 1,000 Ukrainian soldiers killed in action were repatriated by Russia in exchange for those of 38 Russian soldiers.

The Russian Defense Ministry claimed that Russian forces took the village of Bila Bereza, east of Komarivka in Sumy Oblast.

=== 30 January ===
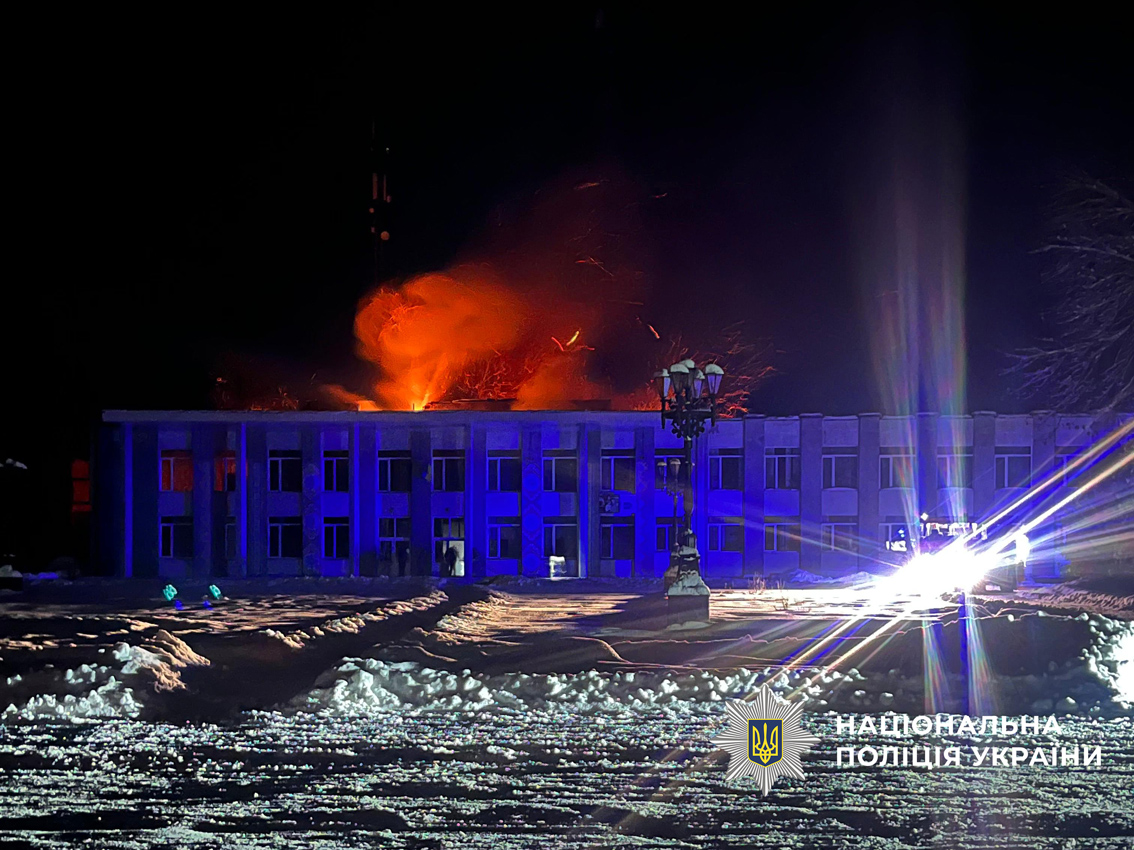
House of culture in Novhorod-Siverskyi (Chernihiv Oblast) after Russian attack

One person was killed by Russian shelling in Kherson.

The Kremlin said that President Putin agreed to U.S. President Donald Trump's personal request to halt strikes in Kyiv until 1 February to create "favourable conditions" for peace negotiations.

Near Stepnohirsk, geolocated footage showed that Russian forces took the village of Lukianivske and the Russian defense ministry claimed that Russian forces took the village of Richne as well as Ternuvate north of Huliaipole.

=== 31 January ===
Ukrainian forces claimed to have destroyed a TOR-M1 near the village of Kamianka, Luhansk Oblast. Attacks were also made in Zaporizhzhia Oblast on "concentrations of enemy personnel" near Rivnopillia, Pryvillia, and Uspenivka, as well as a Russian logistics depot near Voskresenka and a Russian command post in Rivnopillia. Attacks were also made in Donetsk Oblast on troop concentrations near Chasiv Yar and a motorized rifle regiment command post in Poltavka, and a UAV command post near Sluchovsk, Bryansk Oblast.

Near Kupiansk, a Russian milblogger claimed that Russian forces took the village of Podoly while another Russian milblogger claimed that Russian forces almost completely control Petropavlivka. The Russian Defense Ministry claimed that Russian forces took the villages of Berestok, south of Kostiantynivka, Sofiivka, south of Shakhove and Sviatopetrivka, north of Huliaipole.

== February 2026 ==
=== 1 February ===
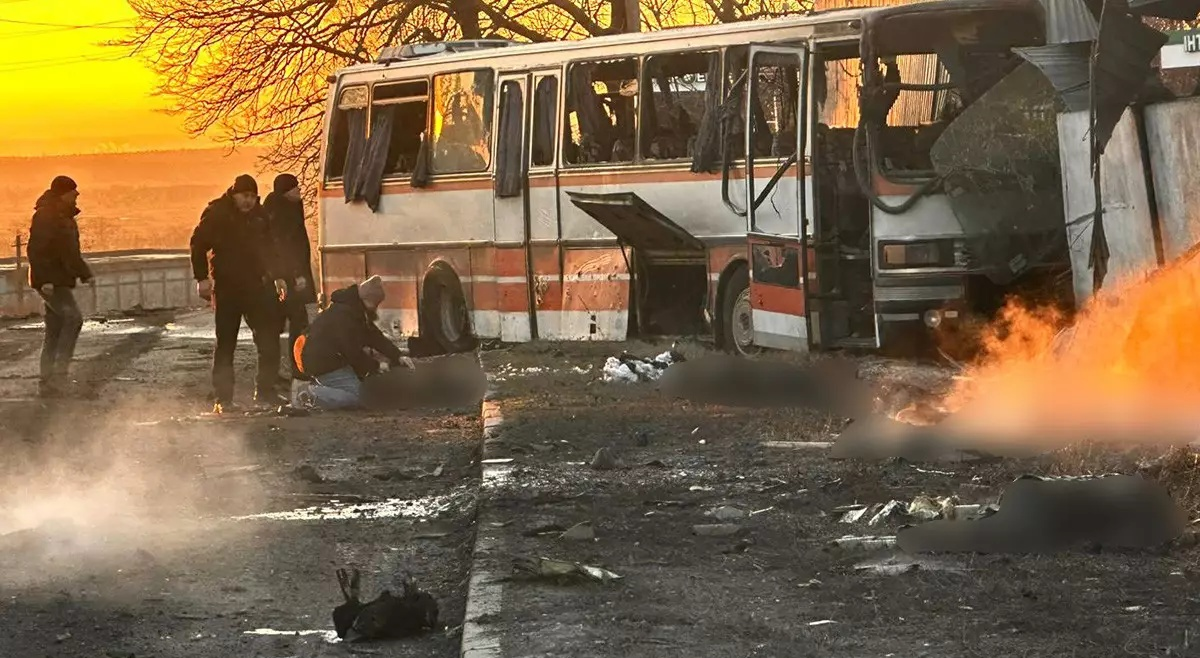
Bus in Ternivka after the attack

A DTEK-owned minibus transporting mineworkers was hit by a Russian drone in Ternivka, Dnipropetrovsk Oblast, killing 12 people and injuring 16.

The Russian defense ministry claimed that Russian forces took the villages of Zelene, northeast of Kharkiv, and Sukhetske, northeast of Rodynske.

SpaceX imposed a shutdown of Starlink satellite internet terminals across Ukraine, with exceptions for preapproved terminals by the Ukrainian defense ministry amid evidence that Russian forces were using the service in military operations.

=== 2 February ===
A Ukrainian drone strike hit Stary Oskol, killing two people and setting fire to a house according to the Governor of Belgorod Oblast. Locals reported six explosions and a fire.

The Russian Defense Ministry claimed that Russian forces took the village of Prydorozhnie, southwest of Ternuvate.

=== 3 February ===
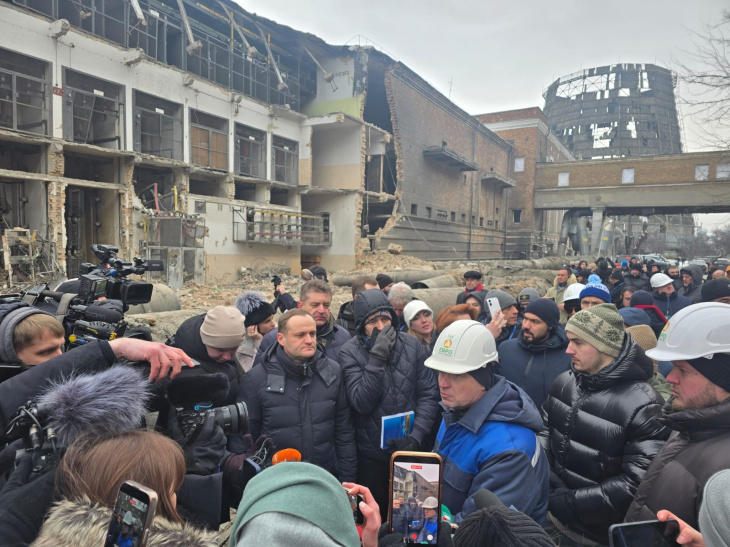
Heads of missions of foreign states and international organizations inspect the destroyed Darnytsia Thermo-Electric Station in Kyiv

Two people were killed in a Russian drone strike on Zaporizhzhia. A separate attack severely damaged the Darnytsia Thermo-Electric Station in Kyiv.

A court in Poland sentenced a Polish national to 3.5 years' imprisonment for spying as part of a Russian plot to assassinate President Zelenskyy in 2024.

According to the Governor of Belgorod Oblast, Vyacheslav Gladkov, 12 Ukrainian missiles and three drones damaged energy infrastructure in Belgorod city, resulting in the loss of power, water and heating for "thousands" in the southwestern part of the oblast.

=== 4 February ===
Seven people were killed in a Russian cluster munitions attack on Druzhkivka, Donetsk Oblast.

President Zelenskyy said that 55,000 Ukrainian soldiers had been killed since the beginning of the war.

ISW reported that Russian forces took the cities and villages of Myrnohrad and Svitle, as well as Pryluky, Olenokostiantynivka, and Zelene, northwest of Huliaipole. Ukrainian military analysist Kostantyn Mashovets reported that Russian forces took the village of Minkivka and Orikhovo-Vasylivka near Kostiantynivka. The Russian Ministry of Defense claimed that Russian forces took the villages of Stepanivka, southwest of Kostiantynivka and Staroukrainka, near Huliaipole.

=== 5 February ===
Russia and Ukraine held a prisoner exchange that saw the release of 157 Ukrainian POWs for the same number of Russians.

Geolocated footage showed that Russian forces took the village of Novomarkove, north of Chasiv Yar.

=== 6 February ===
Lieutenant General Vladimir Alexeyev, the deputy head of the GRU, was shot and severely injured by an unidentified gunman in Moscow.

A Ukrainian soldier was killed in a vehicle bombing in Odesa.

Ten dogs were killed in a Russian airstrike on an animal shelter in Zaporizhzhia.

A Mil Mi-24 of the Ukrainian Army Aviation lost control and crashed during a combat flight in Chernihiv Oblast, killing all three crew members.

Geolocated footage showed that Russian forces took the city of Huliaipole. The Russian Ministry of Defense and several Russian milbloggers claimed that Russian forces took the village of Popivka north of Hrabovske.

=== 7 February ===
The Russian defense ministry claimed that Russian forces took the village of Chuhunivka, northeast of Velykyi Burluk, near the border.

Alexander Bogomaz, Governor of Bryansk Oblast, claimed that energy facilities were attacked by Ukrainian HIMARS and Neptune missiles, causing power outages in seven municipalities. SBU drones struck the Redkinsky Research Plant in Redkino, Tver Oblast. The plant made fuel additives for use in Kh-55 and Kh-101 cruise missiles.

A Russian strike on Kherson's Korabelnyi District injured eight people. A Russian FAB-250 strike in Kramatorsk killed one person and injured three more.

=== 8 February ===
The Russian defense ministry claimed that Russian forces took the villages of Sydorivka in Sumy Oblast near the border, and Hlushkivka, southeast of Kupiansk.

Russian strikes in Nikopol Raion, Dnipropetrovsk Oblast, injured three people.

Atesh claimed to have carried out a sabotage attack on a military communications tower in Belgorod Oblast.

Ukraine imposed sanctions on 128 individuals and entities accused of supplying components for Russian weaponry and circumventing sanctions against Russia.

The Ukrainian General Staff claimed to have struck the Russian test range at Kapustin Yar using FP-5 Flamingo missiles.

=== 9 February ===
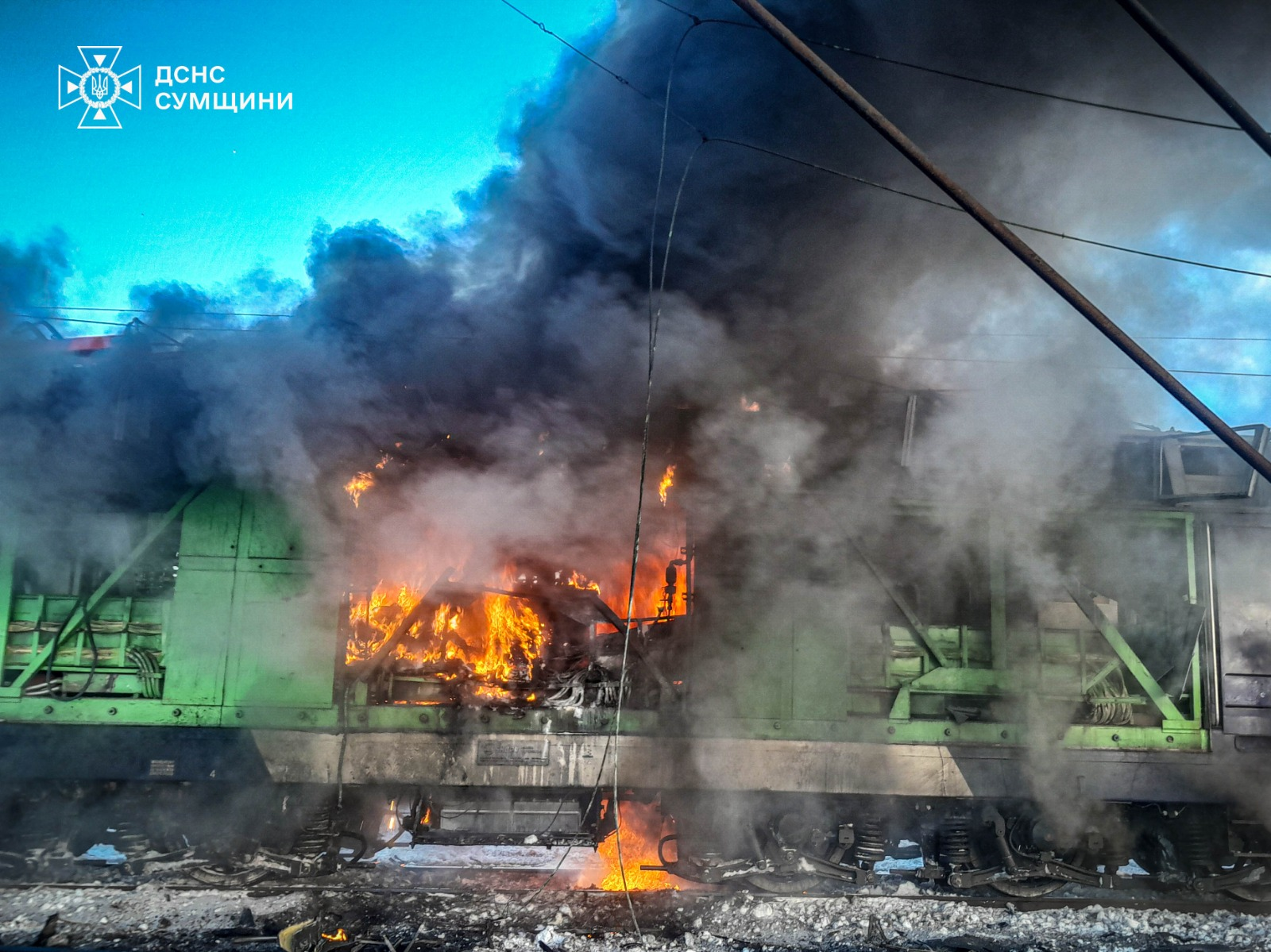
Train in Konotop (Sumy Oblast) after Russian attack on 9 February

One person was killed in a Russian airstrike on Odesa.

The Ukrainian 11th Separate Army Aviation Brigade "Kherson" announced the loss of an Mi-24 helicopter along with its crew during a combat mission.

The Russian-installed mayor of Horlivka, Ivan Prikhodko, announced the death in action of Hayk Gasparyan, the commander of the paramilitary Arbat Battalion composed of ethnic Armenians that had been fighting alongside Russian forces in Ukraine.

An electrical substation exploded in Volgograd during a Ukrainian drone strike. It is unclear if the explosion was due to Ukrainian drones or an accident. Ukrainian drones struck a warehouse holding three containers containing some 6,000 FPV drones in Rostov-on-Don, also damaging more drone containers. The headquarters of a Russian paratrooper unit in Sudzha, Kursk Oblast and an ammunition dump in Novooleksiivka, Kherson Oblast, were also attacked.

Russian forces launched a mechanised assault east of Kupiansk, capturing the villages of Petropavlivka and Stepova Novoselivka.

=== 10 February ===
Two people were killed in a Russian airstrike on Sloviansk.

Geolocated footage showed that Russian forces took the village of Zaliznychne, west of Huliaipole.

=== 11 February ===
Four people were killed in a Russian airstrike on Bohodukhiv, Kharkiv Oblast.

The Lukoil refinery in Volgograd was attacked and set on fire by Ukrainian drones. The JSC Progress Plant, in Michurinsk, Tambov Oblast, was struck by Ukrainian drones. The plant makes aviation and missile control systems, along with equipment for gas and oil pipelines. Ukrainian drones also struck an ammunition depot near Rozivka, Zaporizhzhia Oblast.

=== 12 February ===
A Main Missile and Artillery Directorate ammunition depot near Kotluban, Volgograd Oblast, was attacked by Flamingo missiles resulting in a "series of powerful explosions" and a precautionary evacuations of locals according to Governor of Volgograd Oblast, Andrey Bocharov. Ukrainian drones struck the Ukhta oil refinery, located in the Komi Republic. Some 1,750 km (1,090 mi) from Ukraine, the SBU claimed this was a record for a Ukrainian drone attack. Ukrainian drones also struck an airfield in Hvardiiske, Crimea, the Kirova electrical substation in Luhansk, and a data center in Prymorsk, Zaporizhzhia Oblast. An attack was also carried out on a 55Zh6U "Nebo-U" long-range radar station near Yevpatoria and a BK-16 landing vessel in Novoozerne.

=== 13 February ===
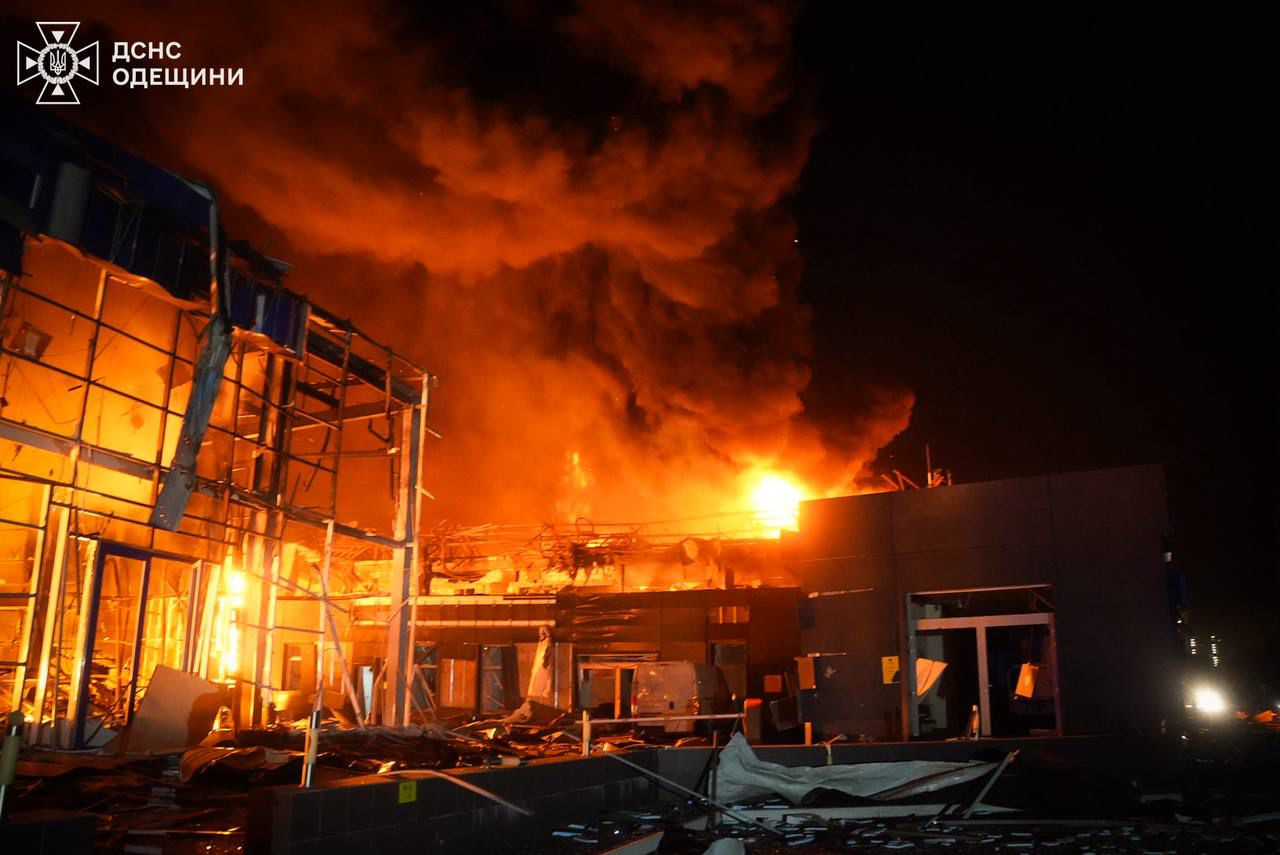
Car showroom in Odesa after drone attack on the city on 13 February

The Ukrainian military said it carried out an attack on a Russian ammunition depot near Novoekonomichne, Donetsk Oblast.

Ukraine unveiled a new Shershen surface-to-air missile system, based on the Israeli Barak 8, tested with "legacy Soviet-era weapons (missiles), foreign-produced missiles, and emerging Ukrainian designs (missiles)".

=== 14 February ===
One person was killed in a Russian drone strike on Odesa, while one person was killed in a Ukrainian drone strike on Bryansk Oblast. Russian-installed authorities claimed that 15 people were injured in a Ukrainian airstrike in Luhansk Oblast.

=== 15 February ===
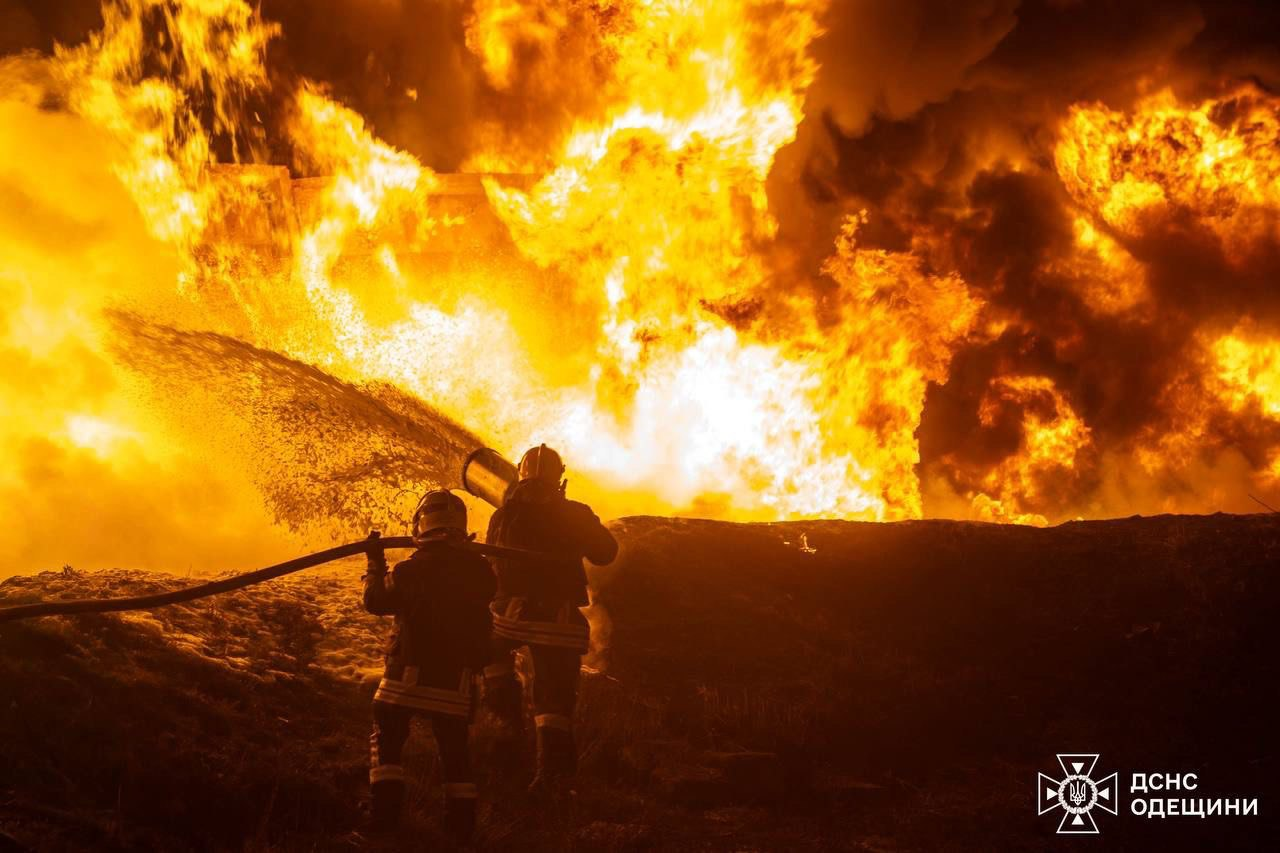
Railway depot in Odesa Oblast after drone attack on 15 February

Ukrainian drones struck targets in Moscow, Bryansk, and Belgorod oblasts. Thirteen drones attacked Moscow with falling debris was reported by the Mayor and flights from Domodedovo airport were suspended. In Bryansk 120 drones attacked the city according to Bryansk Oblast Governor Alexander Bogomaz, cutting power to five municipalities. Parts of the city were left without heat or electricity. Attacks on Belgorod resulted in "significant damage to energy infrastructure", according to Governor Vyacheslav Gladkov.

Ukrainian drones struck the Tamanneftegaz oil terminal, near Volna in Krasnodar Krai, starting multiple fires and injuring two people. A Pantsir-S1 was destroyed in Crimea.

In Odesa, the Odessa Oblast Regional Recruitment Center was attacked by a group of civilians. A "violator of military registration" was being escorted to the Recruitment Centre when the civilians attacked. Using tear gas and physical violence, one military officer suffered a burned cornea from tear gas, while a military vehicle and camera were damaged.

=== 16 February ===
A disabled former Ukrainian soldier was injured in a car bombing in Odesa's Kyivskyi District.

=== 17 February ===
Three people were killed in a Russian drone strike in Mykolaivka, Donetsk Oblast. A separate strike killed one person in Kyrykivka, Sumy Oblast.

Ukrainian drones set fire to the Ilsky oil refinery in Krasnodar Krai. Drones also struck targets in Kazan and Nizhnekamsk; locals reported explosions which disrupted electricity to one part of Kazan. Airports in Kazan, Nizhnekamsk, Krasnodar, Sochi, and Gelendzhik suspended operations. Metafrax Enterprise, a chemical factory in Gubakha, Perm Oblast involved in the manufacture of explosives, was attacked by Ukrainian drones. Witnesses reported multiple explosions and a fire.

A Ka-27 and an Iskander missile storage site were struck by Ukrainian drones in Crimea. A S-300VM missile system was destroyed by drones near Mariupol. The Tamanneftegaz oil terminal in Krasnodar Krai was attacked by SBU drones. Explosions were reported by locals and a fire broke out at the oil terminal.

An explosion occurred at a military commandant's office in Sertolovo, Leningrad Oblast. Three were killed and four were believed to be trapped under the rubble. According to open source information the facility was used to train soldiers in skills for deployment to Ukraine such as "drone operation and counter-drone defense".

=== 18 February ===
A bomb attack was carried out on a Ukrainian military enlistment office in Kolomyia, Ivano-Frankivsk Oblast.

Ukrainian drones attacked the VNIIR-Progress plant in Cheboksary. ASTRA noted that locals reported explosions. Ukraine launched "another massive missile attack on energy facilities" on Belgorod, according to the regional governor Vyacheslav Gladkov, resulting in partial electricity loss in the city. Another drone attack was reported on the oil depot near Velikiye Luki in Pskov Oblast with a report of explosions.

The Russian defense ministry claimed that Russian forces took the village of Kharkivka, west of Komarivka in Sumy Oblast.

=== 20 February ===
Two Ukrainian police officers of the White Angels evacuation unit were killed after their vehicle was struck by a Russian drone in Kupiansk Raion, Kharkiv Oblast.

Ukrainian FP-5 Flamingo missiles struck the Votkinsk Machine Building Plant in Udmurtia, injuring 11 people. The plant is responsible for manufacturing parts for Iskander-M ballistic missiles and intercontinental ballistic missiles with nuclear capability.

A court in Kyiv sentenced a Russian soldier to life imprisonment for the killing of two surrendered Ukrainian soldiers in Kursk Oblast in 2025.

Ukrainian authorities announced the discovery of a Russian plot to assassinate senior Ukrainian political figures following a joint operation with Moldovan authorities that resulted in 10 arrests.

=== 21 February ===
Four people were killed in Russian airstrikes on Znob-Novhorodske, Sumy Oblast. Two police officers were killed in a separate attack in Seredniy Burlyk, Kharkiv Oblast.

Ukrainian drones struck the Neftegorsk Gas Processing Plant in Samara Oblast, resulting in fires and explosions according to social media and local authorities. Ukrainian drones also struck an oil depot in Hvardiiske, Crimea and the Yevpatoria aircraft repair plant, destroying two Rubin-class patrol boats and hitting two Beriev Be-12 amphibious aircraft.

=== 22 February ===
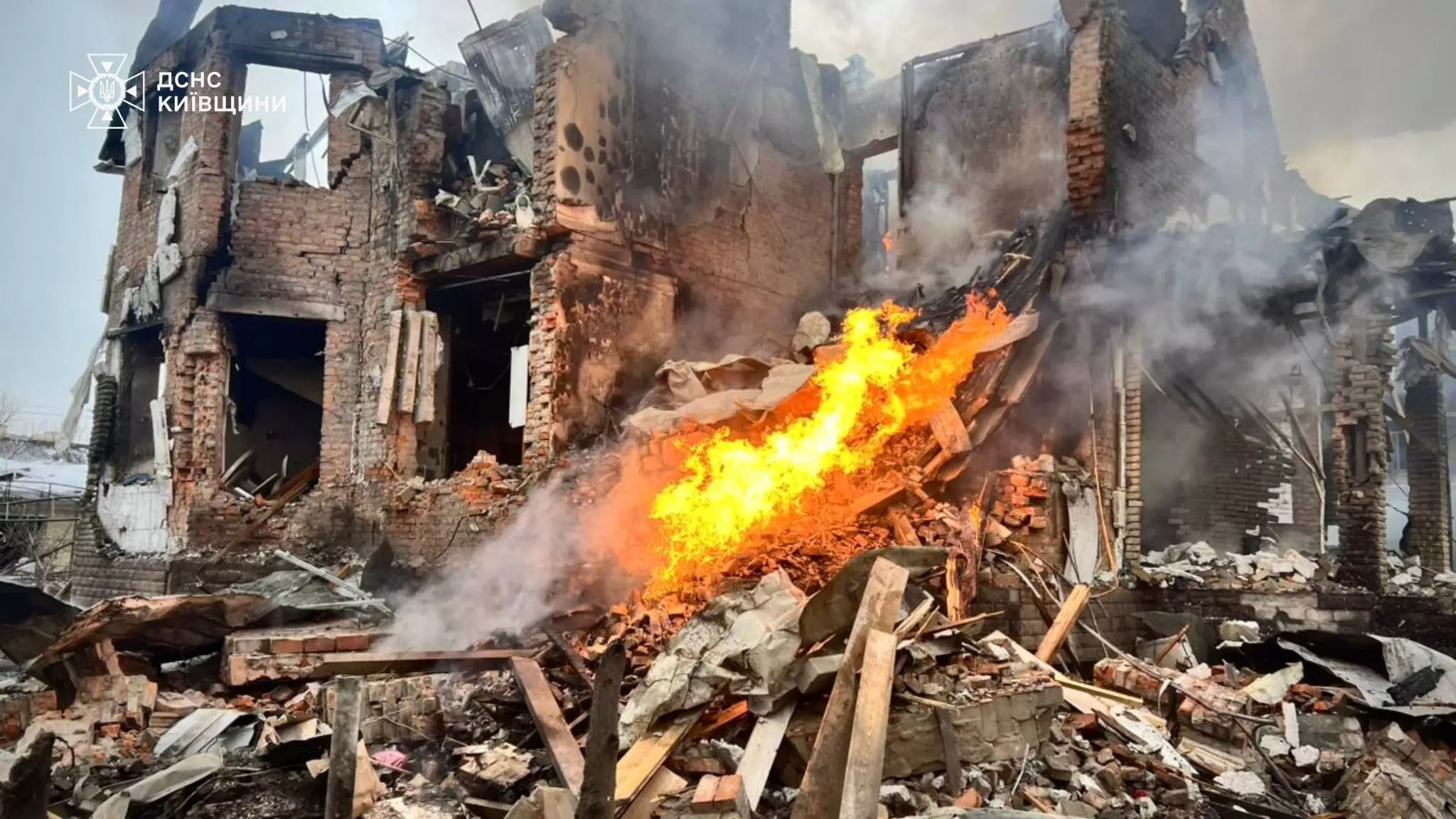
House in Sofiivska Borshchahivka, Kyiv Oblast, after the attack

One person was killed in a Russian airstrike on Fastiv Raion, Kyiv Oblast.

Two explosions in Lviv's historic Old Town, in the early hours of the morning, killed a police officer and injured 25 others, including a further six police officers. The SBU helped police arrest a woman who allegedly carried out the attack as "ordered by Russia" according to Ukrainian officials.

Ukrainian drones reportedly destroyed a Ka-52 and an Mi-8 at the village of Pugachevka, Oryol Oblast.

=== 23 February ===
Two people were killed in Russian drone strikes in Odesa Oblast. A separate strike killed two people in Zaporizhzhia.

Seven police officers were injured in a bomb attack at a disused gas station in Mykolaiv. A separate bombing damaged a police station in Dnipro.

A missile struck the Belgorod thermal power plant. The regional governor, Vyacheslav Gladkov, confirmed a "massive" drone and missile strike on Belgorod's infrastructure which disrupted electricity, heating and water to the city. The oil pumping station near Almetyevsk, in Tatarstan, was also attacked by drones, starting a fire.

Ukrainian Armed Forces commander-in-chief Oleksandr Syrskyi claimed on 23 February, that starting from late January Ukrainian forces restored control over an area of 400 square kilometers and 8 settlements in the direction of Oleksandrivka, Pokrovske settlement hromada.

=== 24 February ===
The SBU arrested two residents of Izmail on suspicion of registering Starlink satellite internet terminals for Russian forces.

ISW claimed that Ukrainian forces retook Andriivka, Ostapivske, Pishchane, Nechaivka, Radisne, and Nove Zaporizhzhia from Russian forces. ATACMS were fired by Ukraine on a Russian 5th Army “auxiliary command” near Novopetrykivka in Donetsk Oblast.

Canadian Prime Minister Mark Carney announced a $2 billion aid package for Ukraine which included over 400 armoured vehicles.

=== 25 February ===
ISW confirmed Russia's control over Pokrovsk and Rivne on a prior date, ending the offensive for the city.

In the Vovchansk front, the Russian Ministry of Defense claimed Russian forces took the village of Hrafske. A Russian milblogger also claimed that Russian forces took the villages of Prylipka and Vilcha. Russian milbloggers claimed that Russian forces took the village of Chuhunivka, southeast of Velykyi Burluk as Prydorozhnie, Varvarivka, and Pryluky near Huliaipole.

Olha Stefanishyna, Ukrainian Ambassador to the United States, said during a briefing that the US government formally warned Ukraine against striking Russian targets that affect US economic interests. The warning was in response to the 14 November 2025 attack on the Caspian Pipeline Consortium pipeline Novorossiysk as US has economic interests in Kazakhstan oil. The letter however "did not propose that Kyiv refrain altogether from attacking Russian military and energy infrastructure".

Ukraine claimed to have destroyed a Russian Buk-M3 air defense system, while its Special Forces destroyed a Pantsir-S1 and an S-400 in Crimea. The commander of the S-400 battery, Lieutenant Colonel Khasan Tumgoyev, was killed in action. His death was confirmed by local media in his native Ingushetia. The Dorogobuzh PJSC chemical factory in Smolensk Oblast was set on fire by Ukrainian drones, injuring 11 people and killing seven.

Andrii Ukrainets, the Ukrainian Air Force's Logistics Commander, and Volodymyr Kompanichenko, the head of the SBU for Zhytomyr Oblast, were arrested by the SBU for embezzling some $320,000 intended for making hardened aircraft shelters. The shelters that were made, some $32 million worth, were found to be vulnerable to attack, did not meet safety requirements and were "inflated costs of works".

=== 26 February ===
ISW confirmed Russia's control over Kleban-Byk on a prior date.

Russian officials claimed that Ukrainian drone strikes killed two and wounded six across Belgorod, Kursk and Bryansk Oblasts.

The bodies of 1,000 Ukrainian soldiers were repatriated by Russia in exchange for those of 35 Russian personnel.

The Ukrainian Commissioner for Missing Persons, Artur Dobroserdov, confirmed that more than 90,000 people went missing in Ukraine due to the Russian invasion in 2022.

=== 27 February ===
The Russian defense ministry claimed that Russian forces took the village of Biliakivka, northeast of Novopavlivka.

Two people were killed in a Russian drone strike in Kharkiv Oblast.

Ukraine set ablaze an oil depot and a substation near Alchevsk, Luhansk Oblast. Ukraine also struck the Belgorod Thermal Power Plant again with what the local governor described as a "massive missile attack". Locals claimed that HIMARS were used and large parts of Belgorod were left without power.

Fire Point (Ukrainian firm) released footage of the test firing of its new FP-7 short range ballistic missile.

The governor of Kursk Oblast claimed that an "energy facility" in Belovsky District was damaged by a drone strike, killing a military volunteer and cutting power.

=== 28 February ===
The Albashneft oil refinery in Krasnodar Krai was attacked by Ukrainian drones resulting in a fire measuring 150 m^{2} (1,600 sq ft).

The Russian defense ministry claimed that Russian forces took the town of Neskuchne, east of Lyptsi, as well as the town of Hirke west of Huliaipole, ISW assessed that Russian forces took the towns of Tsvitkove, Sviatopetrivka, Krynychne, Staroukrainka, and Zaliznychne on a prior date.

== March 2026 ==
=== 1 March ===
One person was killed in a Russian drone strike in Dnipropetrovsk Oblast. The Governor of Russia's Bryansk Oblast, Alexander Bogomaz, claimed a Ukrainian drone killed a woman in the village of Chernookovo. A S-300V air defense missile system near Mariupol was destroyed by FP-2 drones. Ukrainian drones damaged the radar of a S-400 missile system in Osinovaya Gora, Tula Oblast.

A Russian milblogger claimed that Russian forces took the town of Hryshyne, northwest of Pokrovsk.

=== 2 March ===
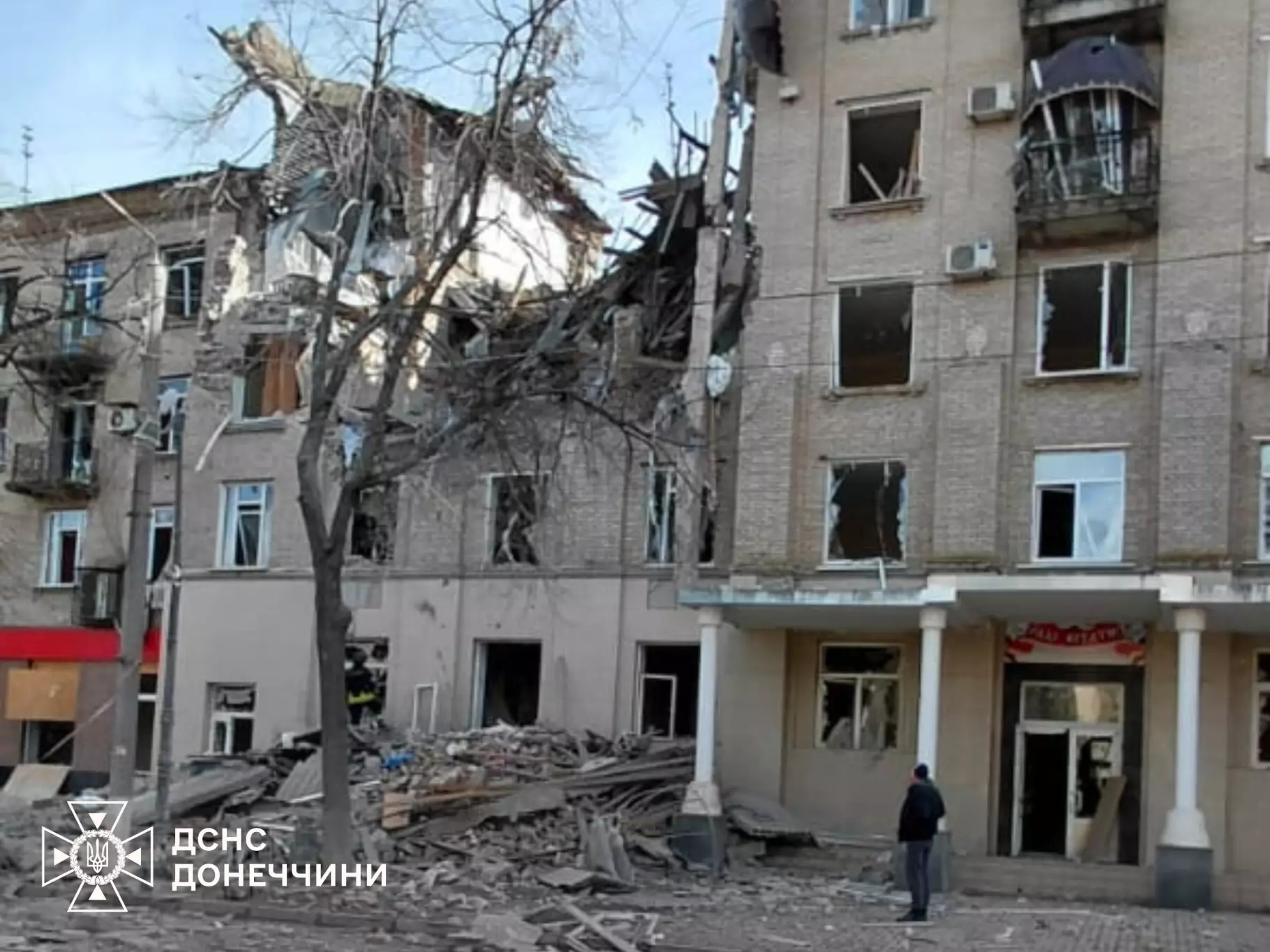
Building in Druzhkivka after the attack

In Donetsk Oblast, three people were killed in Russian attacks on Kramatorsk, while two others were killed in Druzhkivka. One person was killed in a Russian drone strike on a train in Dnipropetrovsk Oblast.

The governor of Belgorod Oblast claimed that one person was killed in a Ukrainian drone strike near the border.

The Ukrainian military said it had retaken nine settlements in the Oleksandrivka sector, at the junction of Donetsk, Zaporizhzhia, and Dnipropetrovsk oblasts.

Ukrainian drones struck Novorossiysk, damaging buildings, starting a fire at the Sheskharis oil terminal, and destroying an S-300PMU-2 missile system, a Pantsir-S2 and six out of the seven oil berths. Five vessels of the Russian Black Sea Fleet were damaged including the Russian frigate Admiral Essen, killing three sailors and wounding 14.

=== 3 March ===
The Russian shadow fleet tanker MT Arctic Metagaz caught fire and was reported to have sunk by the Libyan Coast Guard after an alleged drone strike while sailing between Malta and Libya. Russian foreign ministry spokesperson Maria Zakharova claimed Ukraine attacked the vessel using drones launched from the Libyan coast. On 12 March Arctic Metagaz was reported to be a ghost ship and adrift near Lampedusa.

A Russian helicopter was reportedly shot down by friendly fire while repelling a drone attack on Millerovo, Rostov Oblast.

The Russian defense ministry claimed that Russian forces crossed the Russia–Ukraine border and took the town of Bobylivka in Sumy Oblast, as well as the town of Veselianka, north of Stepnohirsk.

=== 4 March ===
Ukraine accused Russia of carrying out a drone attack on an unidentified Panamanian-flagged cargo vessel off Chornomorsk, injuring an unspecified number of crew.

Russia released two dual Hungarian-Ukrainian nationals who had been captured while fighting for Ukraine following negotiations between Putin and Hungarian foreign minister Péter Szijjártó.

Ukrainian Liutyi drones struck a chemical plant in Kirovo-Chepetsk, Kirov Oblast. Ukraine claimed to have shot down a Ka-27 helicopter, over the Black Sea, through unknown means.

Ukraine and Russia each released 200 prisoners as part of a two-day prisoner swap, with 500 prisoners to be swapped by the end of the week.

A barrage of up to 30 drones was detected over Abkhazia overnight. Authorities claimed that the vast majority were shot down by joint Abkhazian and Russian air defenses. Officials from the Abkhazian Defence Ministry added that no damage or casualties were reported. The incident was the first major direct strike on the breakaway Georgian region of Abkhazia reportedly linked to Ukraine.

=== 5 March ===
The Ukrainian Navy said it had destroyed a Russian Ka-27 helicopter over the Black Sea.

A Russian milblogger said that Russian forces took the town of Maiske, north of Chasiv Yar.

=== 6 March ===
Russian forces abducted 19 Ukrainian civilians after capturing the settlement of Sopych, Sumy Oblast.

An intercepted Ukrainian drone crashed in Sevastopol, injuring nine people.

Ukrainian drones set fire to the 500 kV Kubanskaya substation in Krasnodar Krai.

Russia and Ukraine exchanged 300 POWs in an exchange.

=== 7 March ===
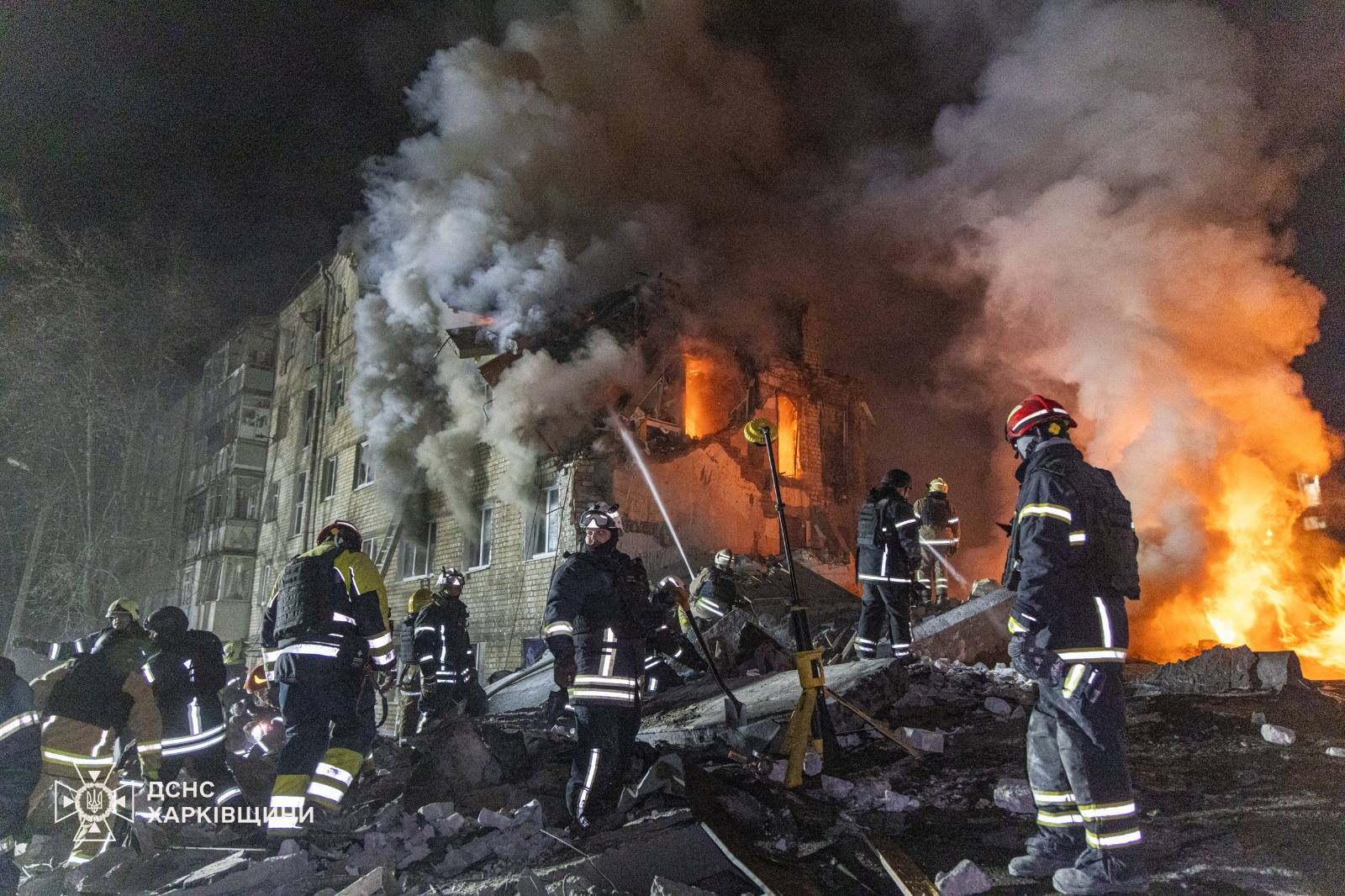
Apartment building in Kharkiv after the missile strike

Russia attacked Ukraine with 509 drones and missiles. At least 11 people were killed in a Russian airstrike on Kharkiv.

Ukrainian forces fired SCALP missiles and ATACMS at a Shahed storage depot located at Donetsk Airport, causing a fire and secondary explosions.

A Russian strike on the Dniester Hydroelectric Station caused the contamination of the Dniester river with oily substances which affected Ukraine and Moldova. The Moldovan government declared an environmental alert in the river basin.

=== 8 March ===
Russian-installed officials claimed that one person was killed in a Ukrainian drone strike in Vasylivka, Zaporizhzhia Oblast.

Ukrainian drones set fire to the Armavir linear production and dispatch station in Krasnodar Krai. The Unmanned Systems Forces (USF) destroyed two Russian Tor missile systems in Donetsk Oblast using FP-2 drones. Ukrainian drones struck a Russian robot drone factory located in a former Ford dealership on Kyivskyi Avenue in Donetsk.

=== 9 March ===
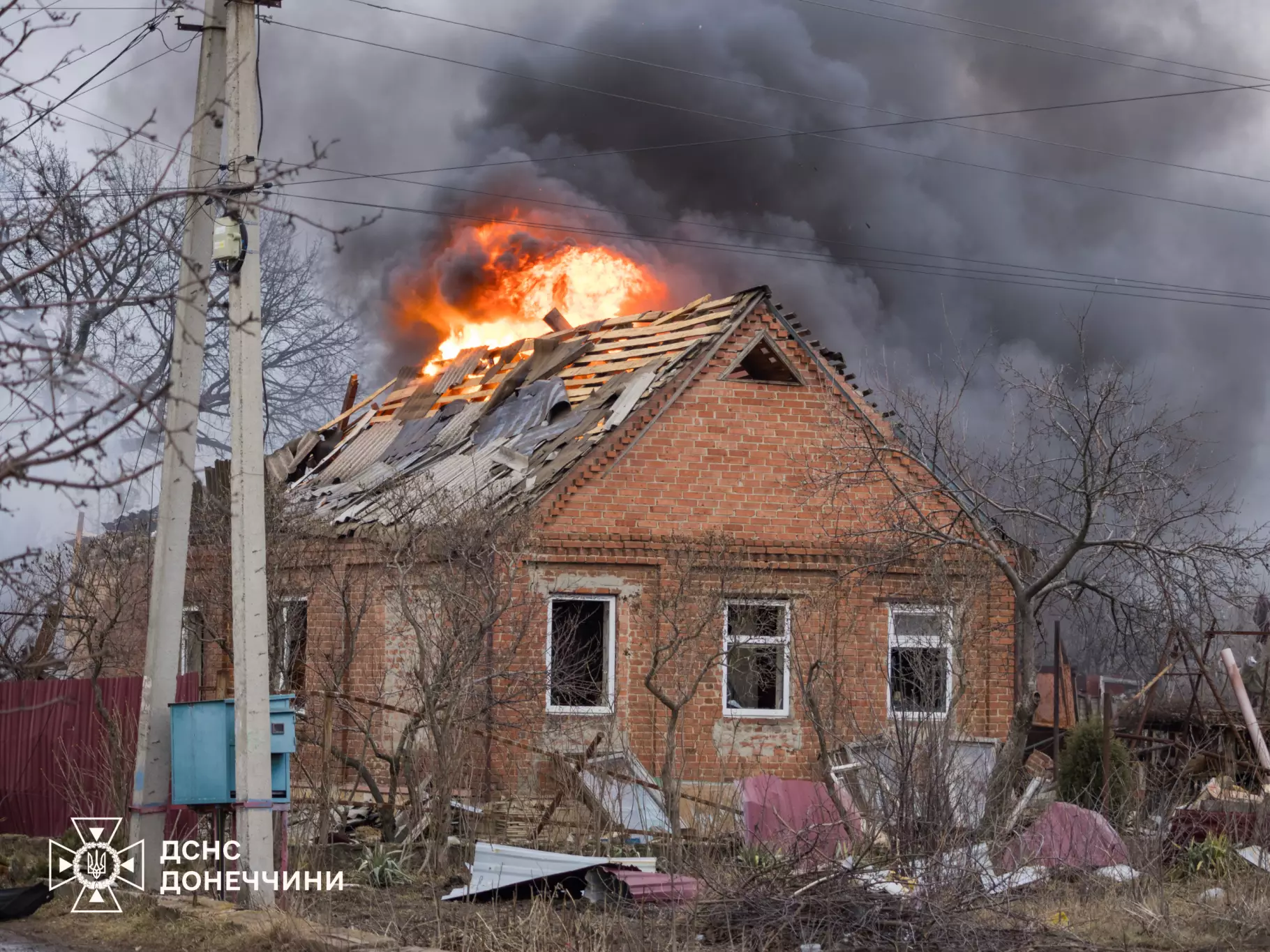
House in Sloviansk (Donetsk Oblast) after a strike

The Ukrainian Air Force announced the death of Colonel Oleksandr Dovhach, commander of the 39th Tactical Aviation Brigade, during a combat operation in eastern Ukraine.

The Ukrainian Navy claimed the destruction of a 02510 BK-16 landing craft in Novoozerne, three Russian Pantsir-S1 air defense missile and an Orion drone base in Crimea.

Russian milbloggers claimed that Russian forces took the town of Illinivka, southwest of Kostiantynivka.

=== 10 March ===
In his interview to RBC-Ukraine, general Oleksandr Komarenko, head of the Main Operative Department at the General Staff of the Ukrainian Armed Forces, claimed that during the past month Ukrainian forces had restored control over 285.6 km^{2} (110.3 sq mi) in Oleksandrivka direction and almost fully liberated the territory of Dnipropetrovsk Oblast. According to Komarenko, in total Ukrainian forces had cleared 400 km^{2} (150 sq mi) of territory since the beginning of counteroffensive operations, and February 2026 became the first month since 2024 when Ukraine regained more territory than it lost.

Multiple Storm Shadow missiles struck the Kremniy EL factory in Bryansk, one of “Russia's largest military microelectronics producers” according to the Ukrainian General Staff. Six people were killed.

According to HUR director Oleh Ivashchenko and President Zelenskyy, the agency obtained a classified Kremlin assessment of Russian casualties showing that some 1,315,000 Russian soldiers had been killed or wounded in action since the start of the full-scale invasion of Ukraine. Zelenskyy claimed that these figures were "understated".

=== 11 March ===
Two people were killed in a Russian drone strike on Kharkiv, while Russian-installed authorities in Zaporizhzhia Oblast claimed two people were killed in a Ukrainian drone strike in Vasylivka. A Russian drone attack injured over 40 Ukrainian police officers at the district headquarters in Shostka, Sumy Oblast.

The KuibyshevAzot chemical plant in Tolyatti was set on fire by Ukrainian drones. The mayor of Sochi, Andrey Proshunin, claimed that the city had been under a drone attack that lasted "almost a full day with small breaks". The Kosogorsky metallurgical plant in Tula, was set on fire. The cause of the blaze was unknown. However a drone alert warning was issued for the city.

Ukrainian FPV drones struck a target 50 km (31 mi) near Donetsk following a new communication system that avoids Russian EW systems.

The Russian defense ministry claimed that Russian forces took the town of Chervona Zoria near the border in Sumy Oblast.

=== 12 March ===
Ukrainian drones struck the oil tanks at the Tikhoretsk-Nafta oil hub in Krasnodar Krai, starting a fire in the pumping station. One person was killed in a drone attack on an agriculture company in Novominskaya, also in Krasnodar Krai.

=== 13 March ===
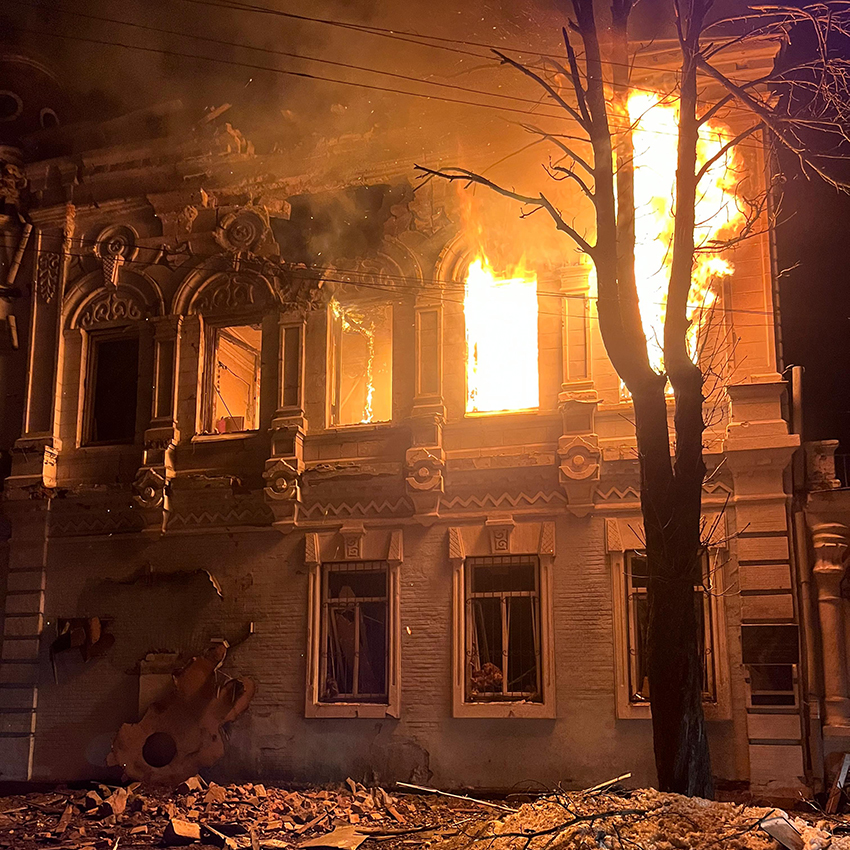
Library in Novhorod-Siverskyi after Russian drone attack on 13 March

Ukrainian drones struck the Khanskaya Air Base, Kacha Air Base and Belbek Airport. The Uralchem plant in Kirovo-Chepetsk, Kirov Oblast, was again attacked by Ukrainian drones.

A court in Russia sentenced five Ukrainian POWs captured during the Kursk campaign in 2025 to up to 18 years' imprisonment on various charges.

=== 14 March ===
Two people were killed in a Russian airstrike on Brovary Raion, Kyiv Oblast. One person was killed in a separate attack in Zaporizhzhia.

Ukrainian drones attacked the Afipsky oil refinery, starting a fire. Port Kavkaz was also attacked damaging a “technical vessel” and injuring three people. Ukraine struck Khanskaya air base again. The Greek-flagged oil tanker Maran Homer was struck by a drone near Novorossiysk, resulting in minor damage.

Ukrainian drones destroyed an Iskander ballistic missile launcher near the village of Vyshneve in Crimea. The HUR damaged the Kerch Strait ferries Slavianin and Avangard, saying that both ships were transporting military supplies. Moscow Mayor Sergey Sobyanin said that 65 drones had been intercepted en route to the city. The Russian Ministry of Defence also claimed to have shot down some 300 drones over various parts of Russia.

=== 15 March ===
Ukrainian drones struck the Tikhoretsk oil hub, resulting in a large plume of smoke and an "orange glow". The Governor of Belgorod also reported a missile strike resulting in "disruptions in electricity, water, and heating supply". In Crimea, the Tavriyskaya thermal power plant in Simferopol, two radar stations near Libknekhtivka and an S-400 missile system near Dalnie were hit by drones. A stockpile of Russian air defence missiles was destroyed by Ukrainian drones in Dovzhansk, Luhansk Oblast. Ukrainian drones attacked Moscow for a second day, with the Mayor of Moscow reporting 40 drones intercepted en route to the city.

In Moldova, a 15-day environmental alert was declared in the Dniester River basin after a Russian attack on the Dniester Hydroelectric Station in neighboring Ukraine led to an oil leakage that threatened water supplies.

Geolocated footage showed that Russian forces took the town of Novopavlivka, west of Kostiantynivka.

=== 16 March ===
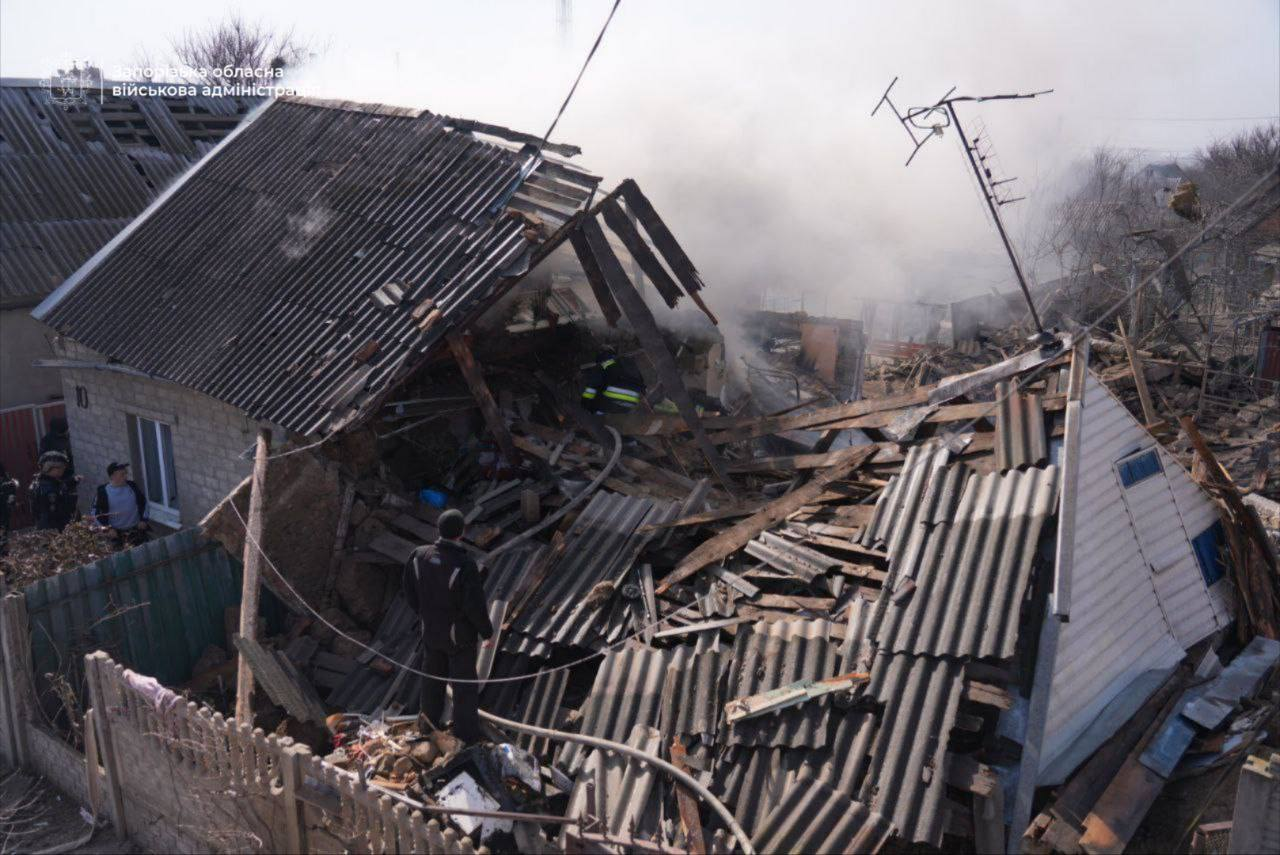
House in Zaporizhzhia after the attack

Three people were killed in Russian attacks on Zaporizhzhia and Dnipropetrovsk Oblasts. A drone attack on Kyiv led to drone debris falling on Maidan Nezalezhnosti.

Ukrainian drones attacked the oil refinery in Labinsk, setting it ablaze. Five drones were shot down near the Aviastar-TU aircraft manufacturing plant in Ulyanovsk.

Russian general Valery Gerasimov claimed that Russian forces took the towns of Kalenyky, west of Siversk and Rohizne, east of Tyotkino.

=== 17 March ===
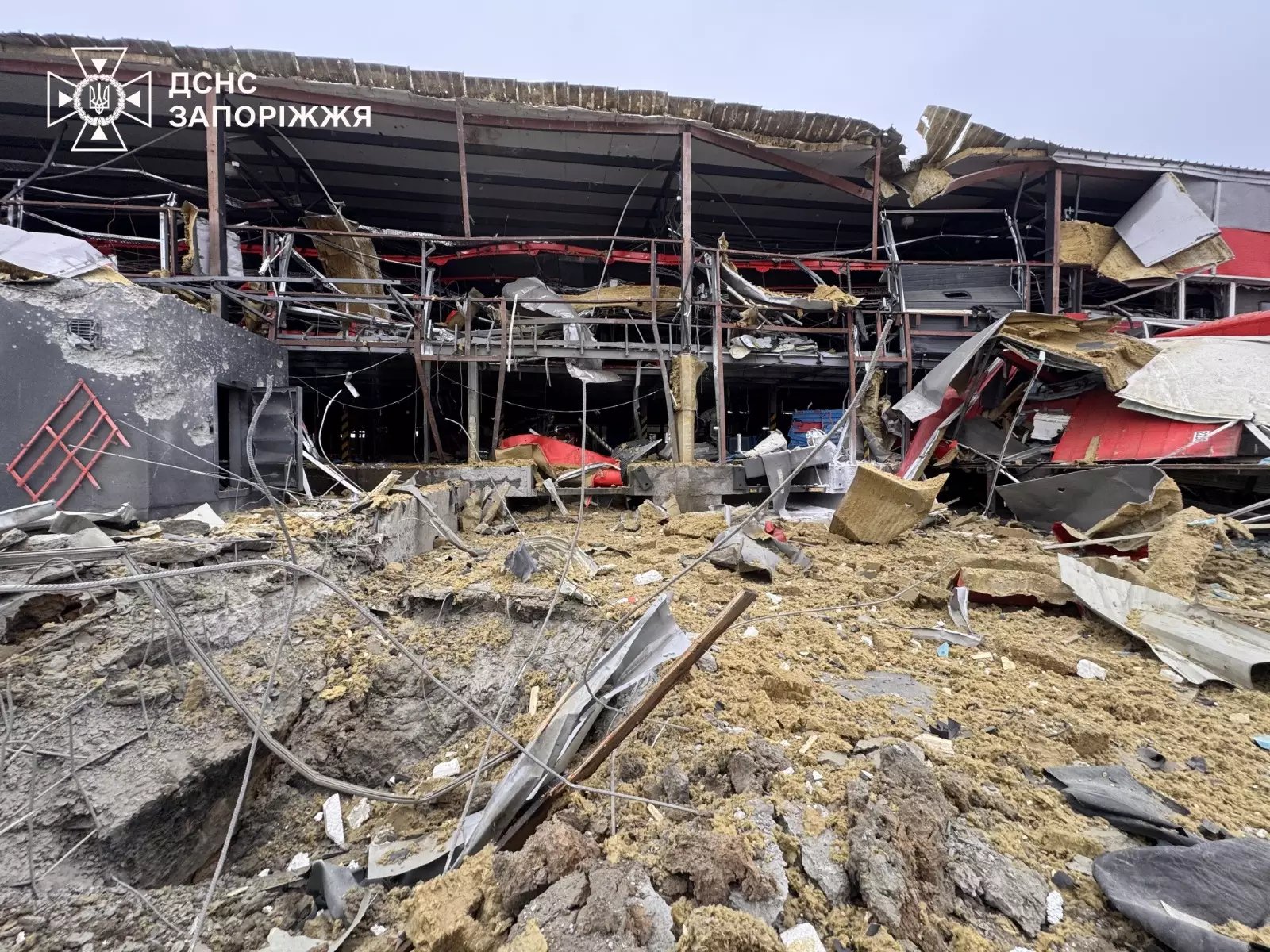
Distribution centre of Nova Poshta in Zaporizhzhia after Russian missile strike on 17 March

The governor of Belgorod Oblast said one person was killed in a Ukrainian drone strike on Grayvoron. Ukrainian drones struck the 123rd Aircraft Repair Plant in Staraya Russa, Novgorod Oblast. The plant is responsible for repairing, upgrading, and servicing military aircraft. For the fourth day in a row Ukrainian drones attacked Moscow. According to the Russian Ministry of Defence some 206 drones entered Russian airspace with 40 aimed at Moscow. Moscow Mayor Sergey Sobyanin claimed that 39 drones had been downed. No casualties nor damage were reported. Atesh separately claimed to have set fire to three cellular towers equipped with electronic warfare antennas in Novgorod Oblast.

A Russian milblogger claimed that Russian forces took the town of Charivne, southwest of Huliaipole.

=== 18 March ===
The mayor of Krasnodar said one person was killed in a drone strike on an apartment.

The Ukrainian military said it had carried out a drone strike on a command post of the Russian Center for Advanced Unmanned Technologies "Rubicon" in Donetsk. Atesh partisans claimed to have disabled a locomotive on railway junction near Simferopol.

Russian drones damaged the SBU headquarters in Lviv.

=== 19 March ===
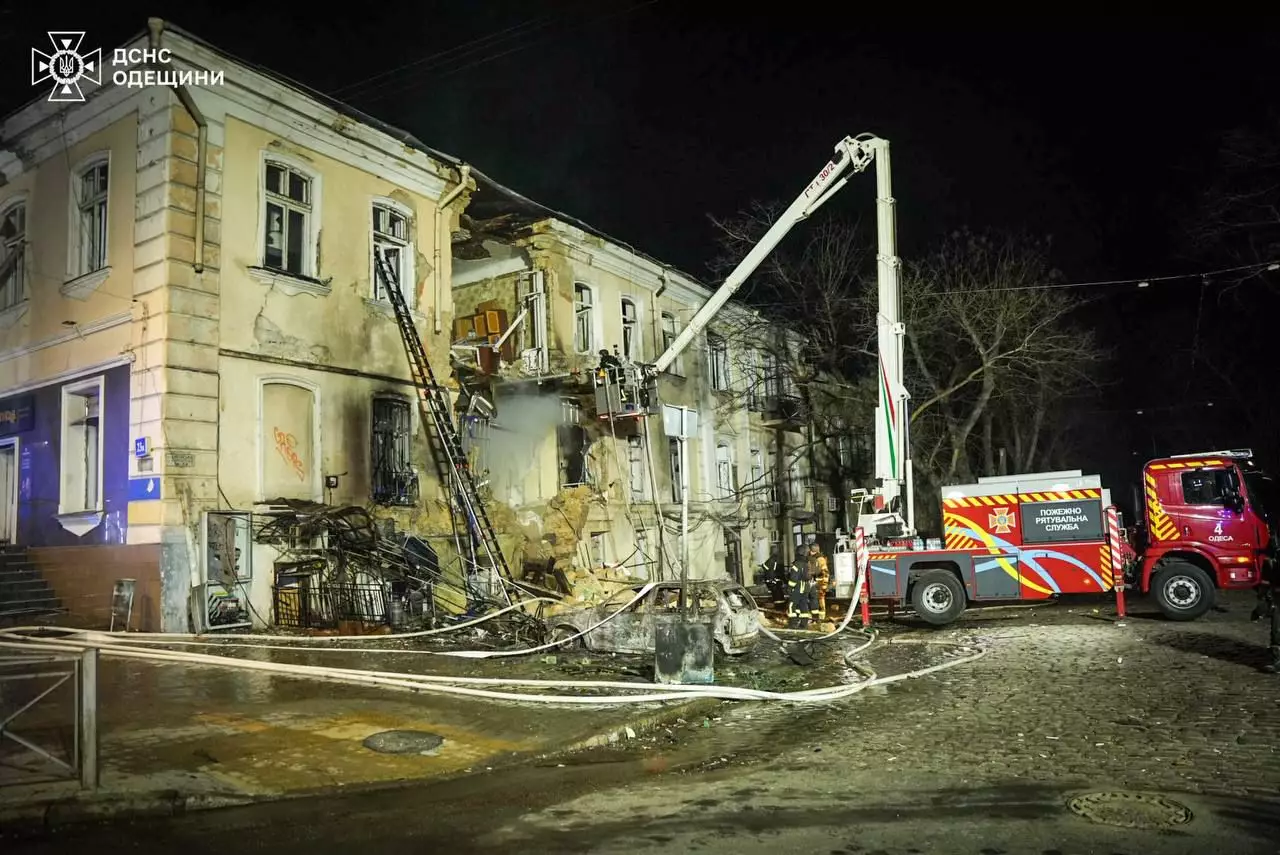
Apartment building in historic centre of Odesa after drone strike on 19 March

Ukraine launched a drone attack on Sevastopol, damaging a building belonging to the 3rd Radio-Technical Air Defense Regiment. Governor Mikhail Razvozhayev claimed that one person had died and two were wounded. An apartment building caught fire. The Ukrainian military confirmed it had carried out strikes on equipment supporting electronic warfare and radio reconnaissance systems in Sevastopol and a logistics warehouse at Khersones air base.

In Stavropol Krai, Nevinnomyssk was struck by drones, with locals reporting explosions. The governor confirmed the city's “industrial zone” was attacked, with the Nevinnomyssk Azot chemical plant the likely target.

A court in Kyiv suspended Yaroslav Lysenko, commander of the 43rd Brigade, from his position on charges of abuse of power and helping military personnel evade service by employing them on personal businesses in Kyiv and Cherkasy oblasts.

=== 20 March ===
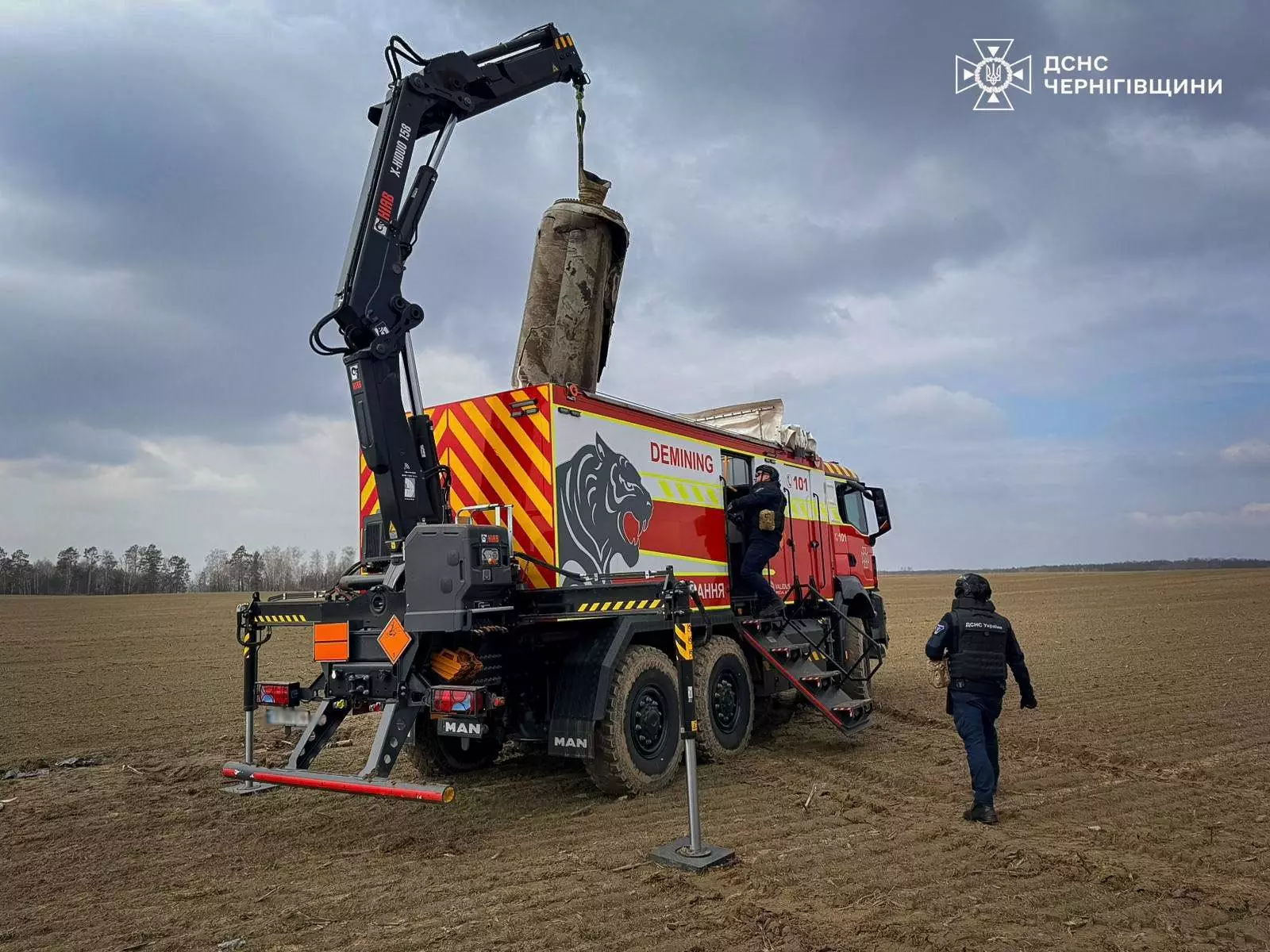
Removal of an Iskander missile found on a field in Chernihiv Oblast

The governor of Belgorod Oblast claimed that one person was killed in a Ukrainian drone strike on Murom.

Ukrainian drones struck the Alchevsk Metallurgical Plant in Luhansk Oblast. Four explosions were reported; previously, the Ukrainian General Staff said the plant was making shell casings. A Ukrainian fibre optic drone shot down a Ka-52 helicopter “in the Pokrovsk sector”, according to an aide to the Ukrainian Defence Minister. The crew ejected, but were later killed by another drone. A second Ka-52 was reported shot down by a Russian milblogger in “unclear” circumstances.

Russian air defences near Moscow shot down a light aircraft, killing both pilots, having mistaken it for a Ukrainian drone during an attack on the city.

Ryazan Oblast governor Pavel Malkov signed a decree ordering organisations, including private businesses, to set recruitment quotas for soldiers by 20 September 2026. Companies with 300 employees must nominate two "candidates" for military service, companies with 500 employees must nominate five "candidates".

=== 21 March ===
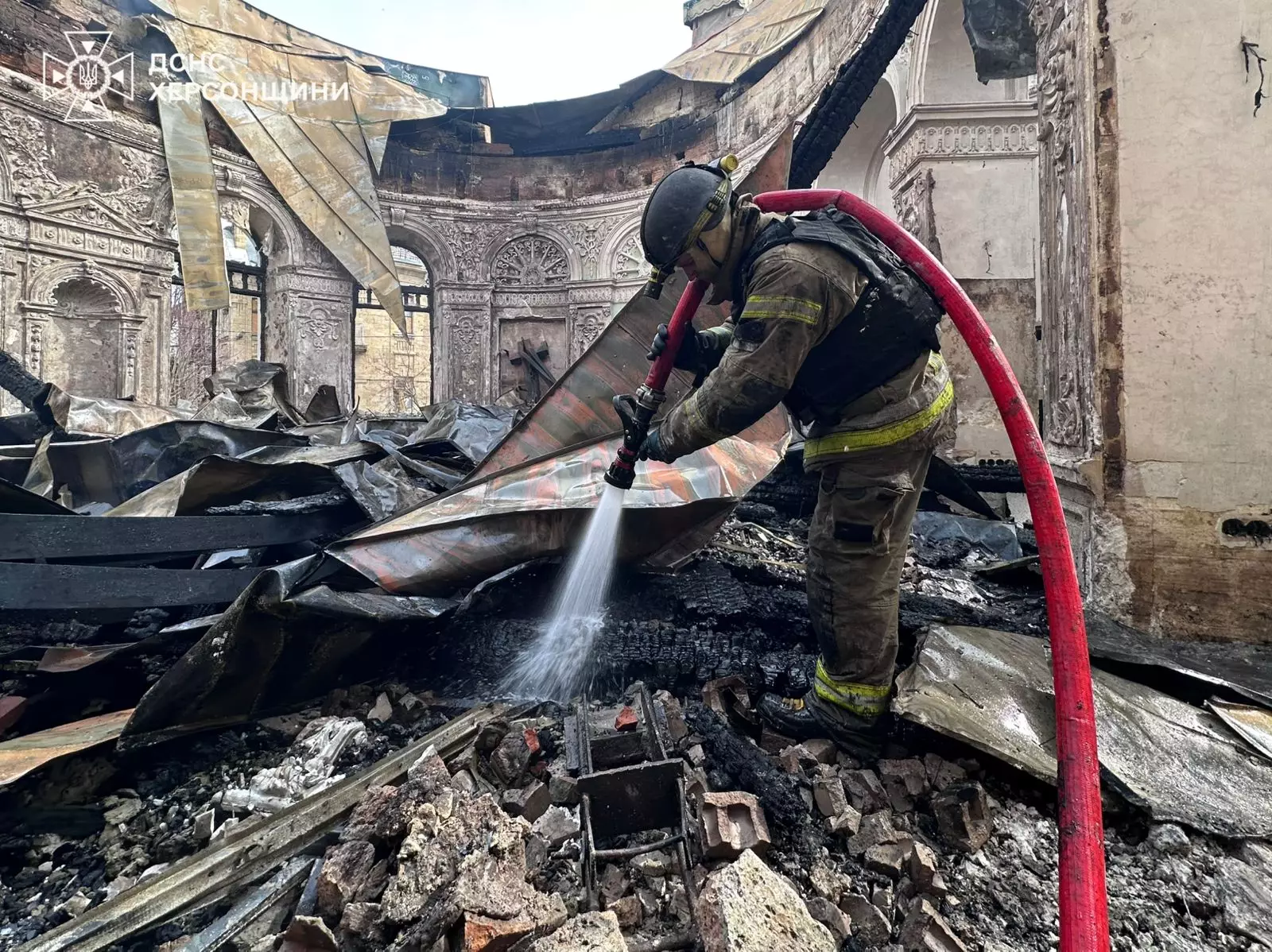
A historical building from 1899 in Kherson after a Russian drone attack damaged it on 21 March

Two people were killed in a Russian attack on Zaporizhzhia. One person was killed in a separate attack in Maidan, Donetsk Oblast. Russian strikes reportedly resulted in power outages in Chernihiv Oblast as well.

Ukrainian drones struck targets in Tolyatti in Samara Oblast and Saratov and Engels in Saratov Oblast. Saratov governor Roman Busargin said that two people were injured and houses were damaged. Locals reported power outages and an attack on the oil refinery. The Ukrainian military also struck a command post for the Rubicon drone unit in Mariupol. Two people were killed by Ukrainian shelling of Belgorod Oblast.

Geolocated footage showed that Russian forces took the town of Rodynske on a prior date.

=== 22 March ===
Russia claimed to have taken the border village of Potapivka in Sumy Oblast.

Ukrainian drones struck an industrial zone close to the oil refinery in Ufa. A plume of smoke, gunfire and explosions were reported by locals.

=== 23 March ===
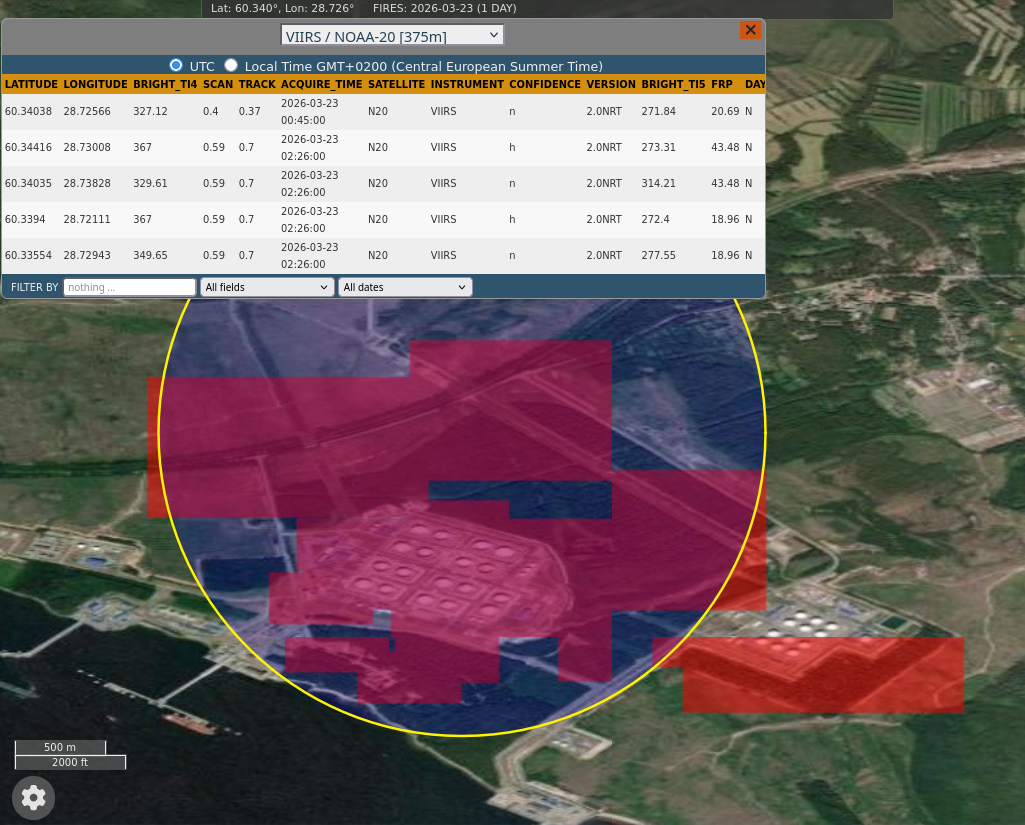
NASA's FIRMS detected extensive fires on 23 March 2026 00:45:00 (UTC) at the port of Primorsk, Leningrad Oblast

Two police officers were injured in a bomb attack in Bucha blamed by the SBU on a suspected "Russian agent", who was arrested.

The port facilities at Primorsk, Leningrad Oblast were damaged after a drone attack set a fuel tank on fire. Pulkovo Airport was temporarily closed.

The USF struck a "Shahed-type UAV" depot in Donetsk Oblast using Fire Point drones. A similar attack was carried out on a train in Luhansk Oblast. A strike was conducted on a workshop in Avdiivka that Ukraine claimed was "used to manufacture chemical munitions" such as chloropicrin.

Geolocated footage showed that Ukrainian forces likely retook the town of Minkivka, north of Chasiv Yar.

=== 24 March ===
Architectural complex of Bernardine monastery in Lviv after Russian drone attack on 24 March

The SBU said it had killed an assassin working for the GRU who resisted arrest.

The FSB claimed to have intercepted a consignment of heated boot inserts filled with explosives that were to be issued to Russian soldiers fighting in Ukraine.

In Crimea, a Russian column was attacked by Ukrainian drones. The HUR claimed that two 3M22 Zircon missiles and a Bastion-M launcher were destroyed and another launcher was damaged.

Russian forces fired 400 drones into Ukraine in a single day, killing four people in Poltava, Zaporizhzhia and Kherson oblasts. A Russian drone strike damaged the bell tower of the Bernardine Monastery in Lviv, as well as a nearby residential building. Another residential building was damaged by a Russian drone in Sykhivskyi District. According to governor Maksym Kozytskyi, several buildings were damaged by drones and debris in Komarno, Dobrosyn-Maheriv and Bibrka hromadas of Lviv Oblast. In total, 27 people were wounded as a result of the attacks in Lviv.

The Russian Defense ministry claimed that Russian forces took the town Pishchane in the Russia-Ukraine border and Nykyforivka, southeast of Sloviansk, a Russian milblogger claimed that Russian forces took the town of Lypivka, southeast of Sloviansk.

=== 25 March ===
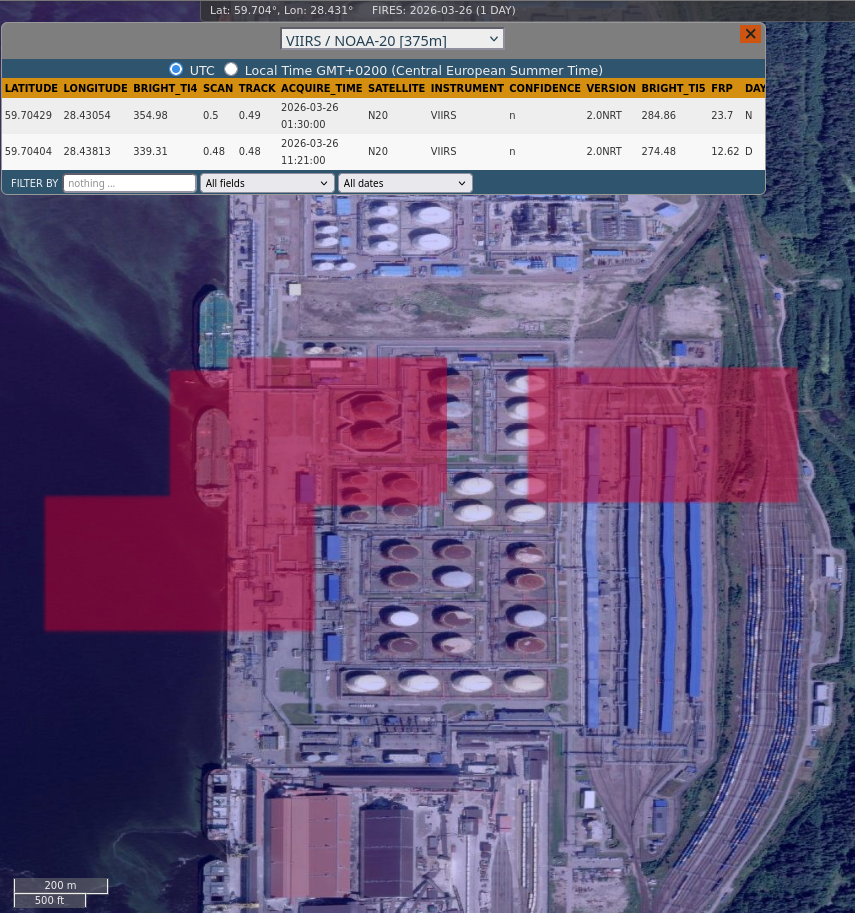
NASA's FIRMS detected fires on 26 March 2026 01:30:00 (UTC) at the Ust-Luga Multimodal Complex

Ukrainian missiles seriously damaged energy infrastructure facilities in Belgorod, according to the regional governor Vyacheslav Gladkov, causing power outages and affecting other services. A shipbuilder in Vyborg was attacked by Ukrainian drones, damaging a Project 23550 patrol ship. The port of the Ust-Luga Multimodal Complex was also attacked, a fire broke out according to regional governor Aleksandr Drozdenko.

=== 26 March ===
The Sierra Leone-flagged, but Turkey-operated crude oil tanker Altura (IMO 9292199) sailing from the Russian port of Novorossiysk was attacked just outside Turkish waters, 33 km (21 mi) off the Bosporus, by an alleged naval drone strike which damaged the vessel's deck, bridge and engine room. The vessel, which was sanctioned by Ukraine, Switzerland and the United Kingdom, started taking on water after the strike but the crew of 27 were unharmed. The vessel had 140,000 tons of oil aboard at the time and regularly travelled from Novorossiysk to Georgia and India according to the HUR.

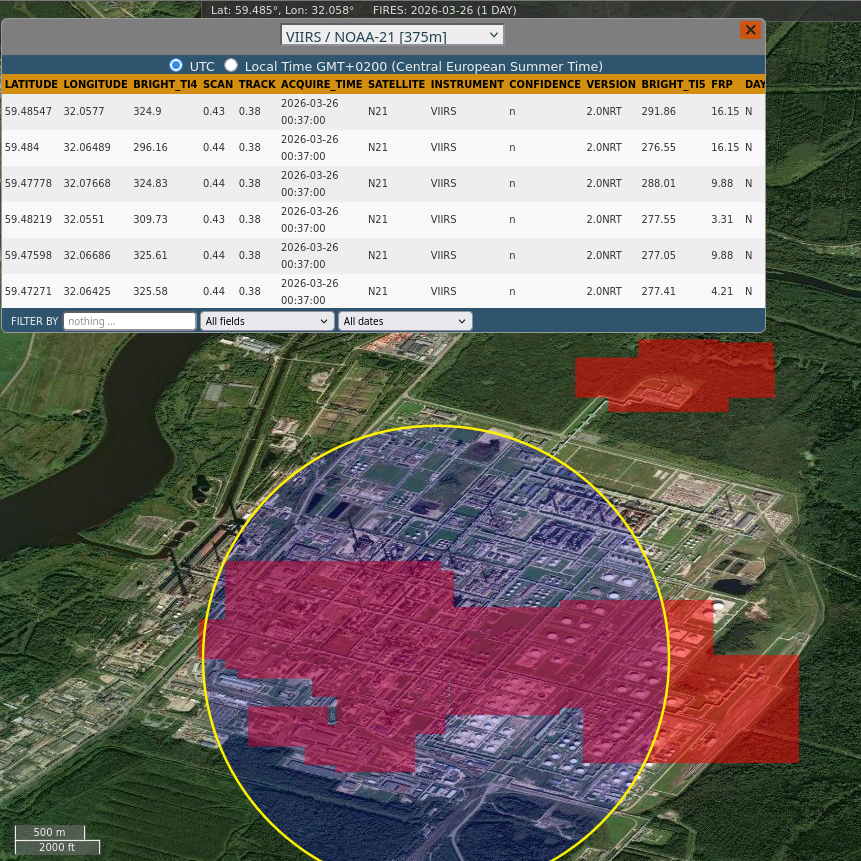
NASA's FIRMS detected extensive fire on 26 March 2026 00:37:00 (UTC) at Kinef (The topmost detection is consistent with refinery gas flares)

The Kirishi oil refinery was attacked for a second night in a row by Ukrainian drones. Flights out of Pulkovo Airport were also suspended again. Leningrad Governor Aleksandr Drozdenko claimed over 20 drones were shot down but there was “damage in the industrial zone”. NASA FIRMS reported a fire at the oil refinery.

Ukrainian security services supplied Russian drone pilots with booby trapped spools of fibre-optic cable, killing five Russian UAV operators and injuring four, according to intercepts of Russian radio traffic.

The ISW reported that Russian forces had seized the villages of Kalenyky and Riznykivka in Donetsk Oblast at a prior date, citing geolocated footage.

=== 27 March ===
Drones attacked Primorsk and Ust-Luga for a third consecutive night, with locals reporting explosions in both cities. Pulkovo Airport again suspended flights during the attack. Russian officials claimed to have destroyed some 20 aerial targets. In neighbouring Vologda Oblast drones attacked the Cherepovets chemical factory. Governor Georgy Filimonov confirmed on Telegram that 10 drones had been shot down, while "eight strikes had been recorded". One person was killed in a drone strike in Malomikhaylovka, Belgorod Oblast.

=== 28 March ===
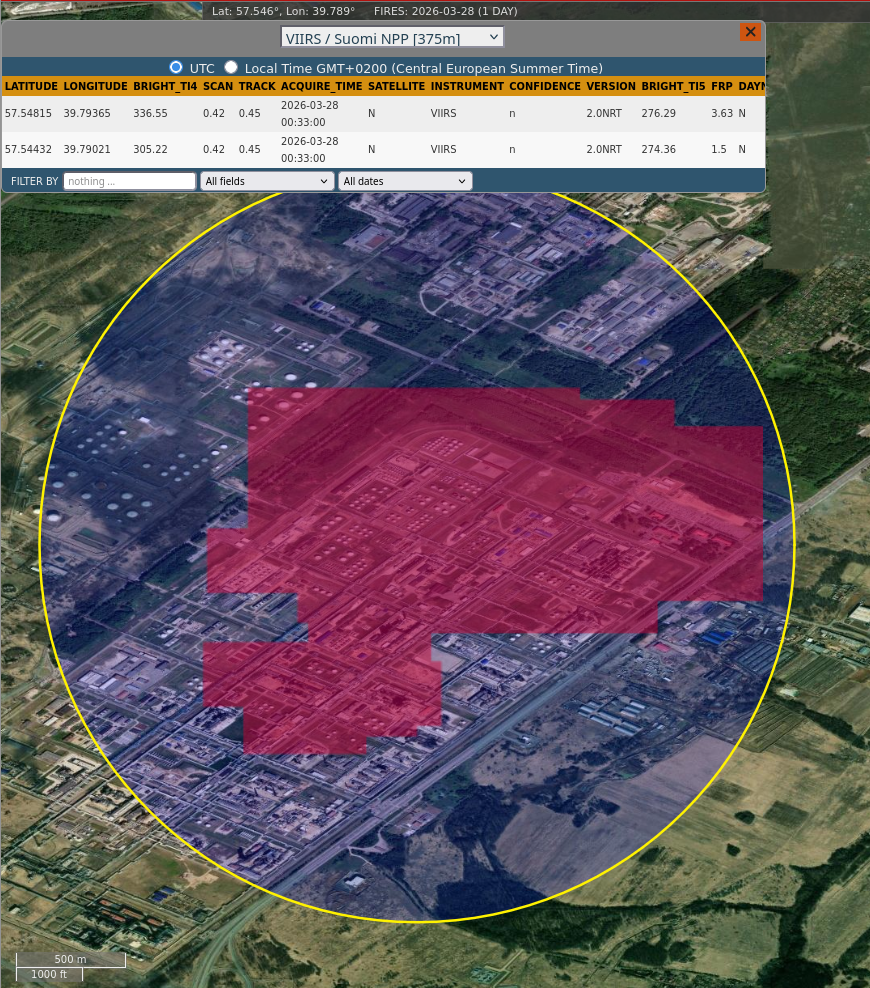
NASA's FIRMS detected an extensive fire on 28 March 2026 00:33:00 (UTC) at Yaroslavl refinery

Four people were killed in Russian attacks on Odesa, Kryvyi Rih, and Poltava Oblast.

Ukrainian drones started a fire at the Yaroslavl refinery, one of Russia's five largest refineries. The Governor of Yaroslavl Oblast, Mikhail Yevrayev, claimed that Ukrainian drones struck a private home, killing a child and injuring three others. As many as 155 Ukrainian drones attacked 16 Russian oblasts as well as Crimea, according to the Russian Ministry of Defence. FP-5 Flamingo missiles destroyed the JSC Promsintez explosives plant in Chapayevsk, Samara Oblast. Subsequent satellite images showed that the attack "failed to deliver direct structural penetration of the production halls". One missile was shot down "at the last moment", a second struck a lightning rod tower and the third missile detonated close potentially causing "minor peripheral damage".

The Russian defense ministry claimed that Russian forces took the town of Brusivka, south of Lyman.

=== 29 March ===
Three people were killed in a Russian airstrike on Kramatorsk.

Ukrainian drones attacked the port of Ust-Luga, causing a fire according to the Leningrad governor. He also claimed 27 drones had been destroyed. Ukrainian drones attacked Taganrog, with reports of explosions. One resident was reported killed, another injured while a drone hit a school.

Fighters of Ukraine's 43rd Mechanized Brigade reported the death of four Russian soldiers and capture of six others from the 153rd Tank Regiment during the previous three days in the area of Kivsharivka.

=== 30 March ===
Ukrainian drones attacked a chemical factory in Tolyatti, Samara Oblast. A separate attack killed one person in Taganrog.

The Russian defense ministry claimed that Russian forces took the town of Novoosynove and Kivsharivka, outheast of Kupinsk, as well as the otwn of Luhivske, southeast of Orikhiv.

=== 31 March ===
A Russian military An-26 crashed in Crimea, killing all 29 people on board, including Lieutenant General Aleksandr Otroshchenko, the commander of the 45th Air and Air Defence Forces Army. A Russian Su-34 was also lost in an unspecified location, killing both members of the crew. Russian officials claimed that the An-26 "was not hit" and blamed the crew. One Russian source stated that the Su-34 was intercepting a drone when it went down.

The Russian defense ministry claimed that Russian forces took the town of Mala Korchakivka in the Sumy Front.

== April 2026 ==
=== 1 April ===
The Russian Ministry of Defence claimed to have seized all of Luhansk Oblast, which Ukrainian officials denied. Sources noted that Leonid Pasechnik, the head of the Luhansk People's Republic, had previously claimed that the entire oblast was captured in the summer of 2025.

The Ukrainian General Staff claimed to have struck the Strela JSC in Bryansk Oblast, claiming that the company produced "components for cruise missiles".

A Russian drone strike in Zolotonosha, Cherkasy Oblast killed four people.

=== 2 April ===
Ukrainian drones struck the Bashneft – Novoil oil refinery in Ufa, starting a fire. Ukrainian drones destroyed a An-72P maritime patrol aircraft and several radars at the Kirovske air base, south of Islam-Terek, Crimea.

An enlistment officer was fatally stabbed in the neck, in Lviv, by a customs inspector.

=== 3 April ===
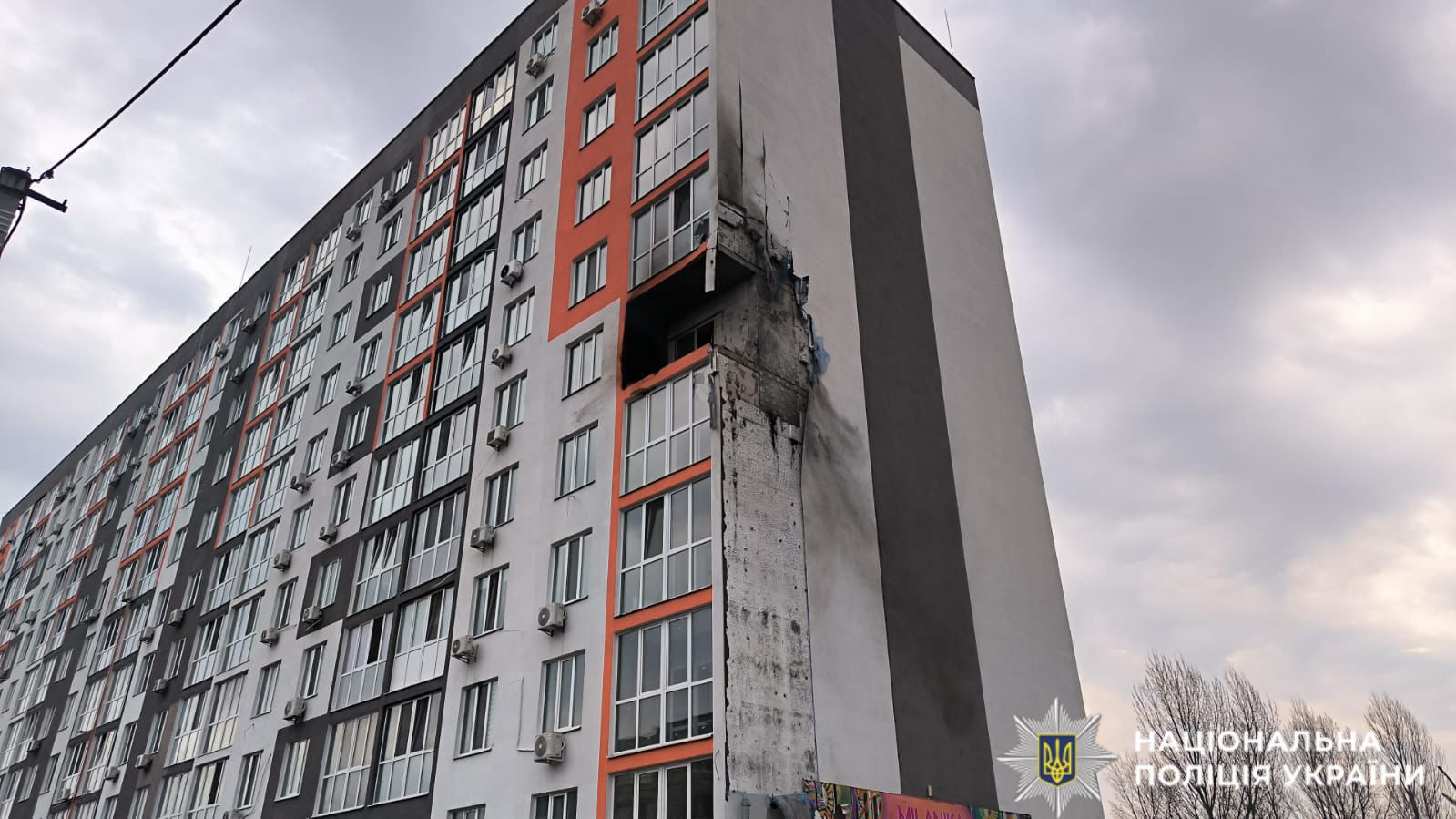
Apartment building in Obukhiv (Kyiv Oblast) after drone strike

Ukrainian drones attacked Moscow Oblast and Leningrad Oblast. In Imeni Morozova, Leningrad Oblast, an explosives factory was targeted, injuring two civilians and damaging an unused building. The local governor claimed that seven drones were shot down. The Mayor of Moscow claimed that two drones were shot down before they reached the capital.

Russia launched airstrikes on Kyiv, Kyiv Oblast and other regions, killing at least 12 people.

The FSB said it had thwarted a Ukrainian plot to assassinate a senior Russian security official following the discovery of a bomb inside an electric scooter in Moscow.

An Su-30 crashed during a training flight over Crimea, both crew were rescued.

=== 4 April ===
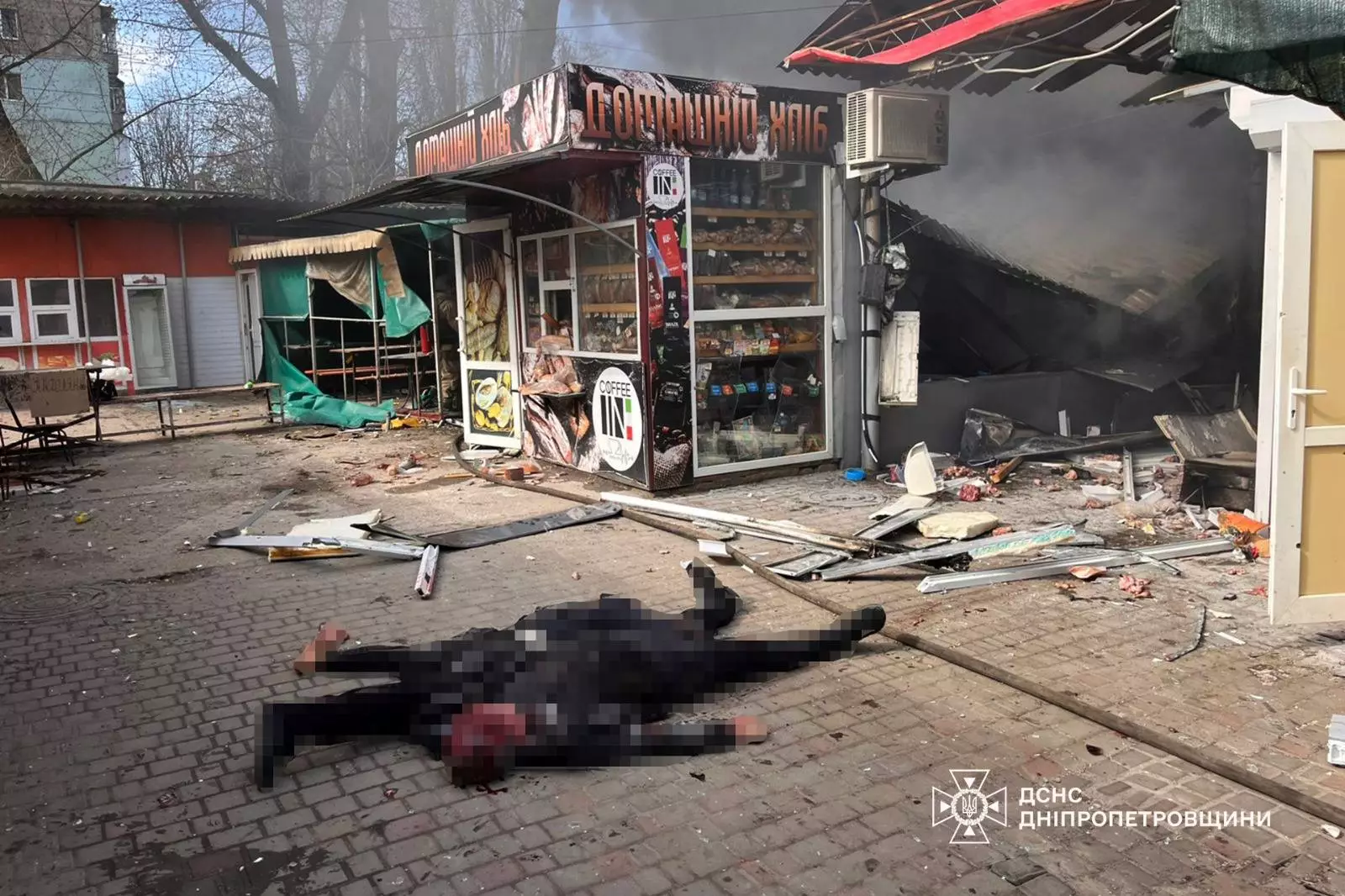
Market in Nikopol after the attack

Five people were killed by a Russian drone strike on Nikopol.

Ukrainian drones struck Tolyatti and Taganrog, with fires being reported in the vicinity of the Togliattikauchuk and Kuibyshev Azot chemical plants in Tolyatti. In Taganrog, locals reported a missile threat and strikes on the KhozAgro enterprise. One person was killed in the attack on Taganrog. The Ukrainian military also carried out overnight attacks on Russian fuel trains near Stanytsia Luhanska and Shchotove in Luhansk Oblast. The SBU and the USF jointly carried out a drone attack on the Alchevsk Metallurgical Plant.

A Ukrainian unit destroyed two Shahed type drones at a range of 500 km (310 mi) using drone interceptors with “remote control technology”, in what is claimed to be a “world-first strike”.

Two mobilisation officers were injured in a knife attack in Vinnytsia while conducting a document check.

=== 5 April ===
Ukrainian drones struck a Lukoil refinery in Kstovo, causing an explosion. Drones also struck the Novogorkovskaya thermal power plant, disabling power to Kstovo. Nineteen Ukrainian drones struck Primorsk, Leningrad Oblast, damaging an oil pipeline to the port according to Russian officials.

The rail ferry MV Slavyanin sailing between Port Krym in Crimea and Port Kavkaz in Krasnodar Krai was destroyed by Ukrainian drones. It was the last train ferry crossing the Kerch Strait after the rail ferry ship MV Avangard was hit in March.

=== 6 April ===
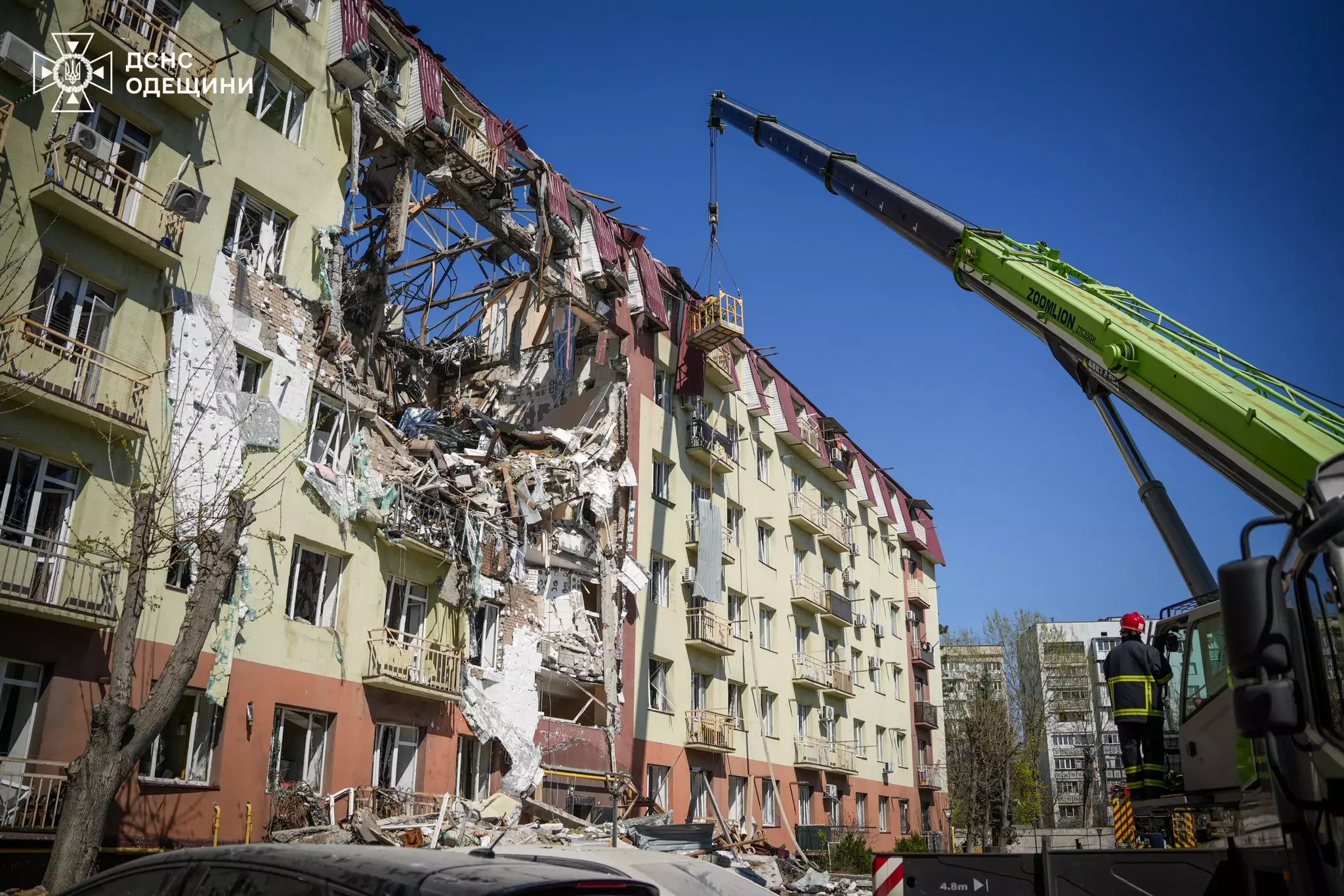
Apartment building in Odesa after the attack

Russian forces attacked Kherson, Odesa, Nikopol, and Kharkiv, killing one person in Kherson and killing three others in Odesa. Russian forces also attacked Ukrainian energy infrastructure across at least four oblasts.

The mayor of Novorossiysk confirmed a drone strike on Russian oil infrastructure. Footage published online suggested that the Sheskharis oil terminal was attacked. Claims were made that FPV drones were used during the attack. There were no casualties but, according to the mayor, drone debris fell on “two enterprises in Novorossiysk”. Ukraine later claimed responsibility for the strike on the oil terminal. The governor of Krasnodar Krai stated that the attack injured eight people, including two children.

Ukrainian forces also attacked the Russian floating oil rig Syvash. Another Ukrainian drone attack on Rossosh destroyed the Minudobrenia plant, which manufactured chemicals used in explosives. Ukrainian drones reportedly attacked the Russian frigate Admiral Grigorovich or Admiral Makarov. The Russian Ministry of Defense claimed that Russia downed 50 Ukrainian drones.

=== 7 April ===
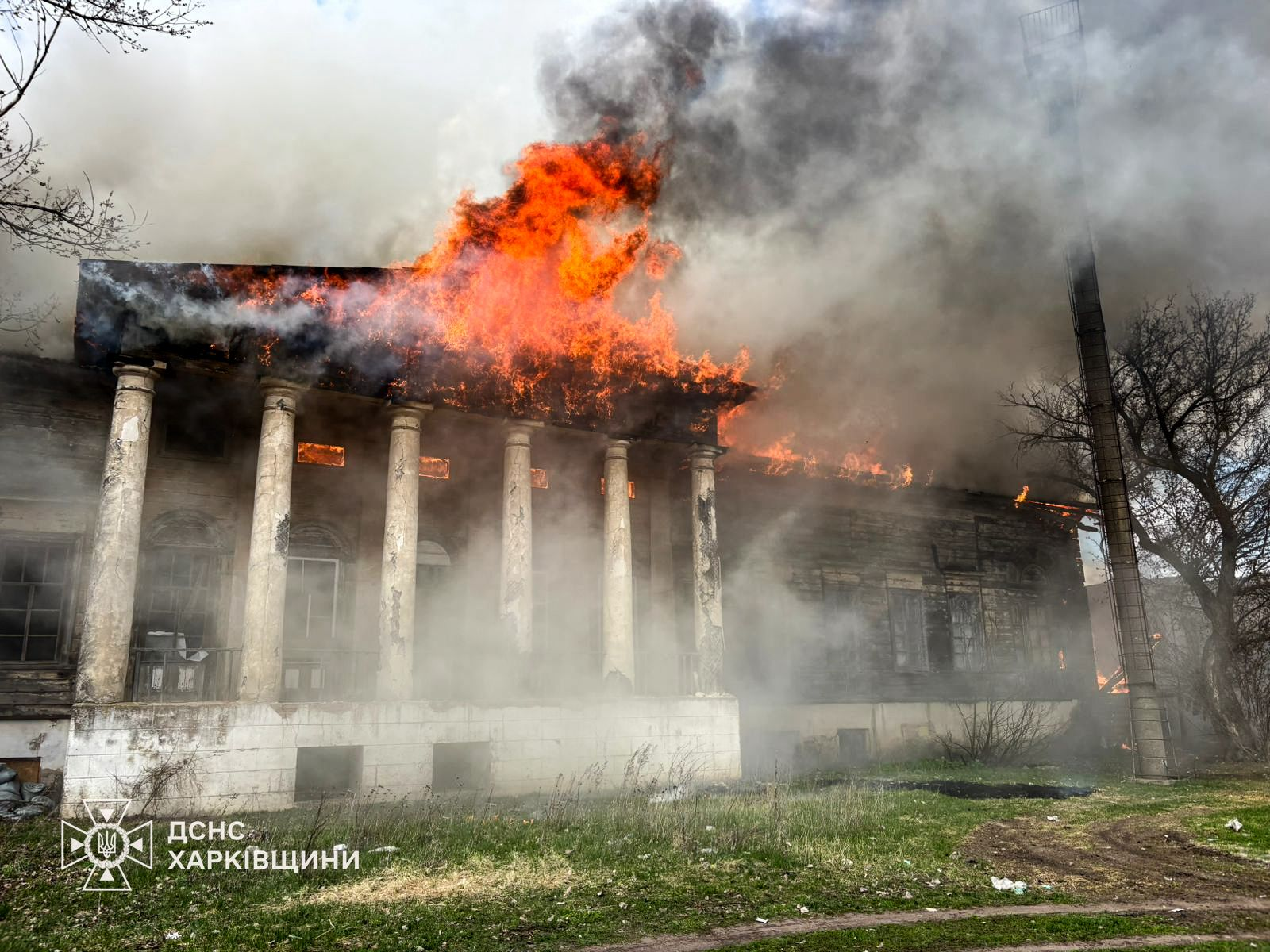
19-century manor in Velykyi Burluk (Kharkiv Oblast) after Russian drone attack

Three people were killed in a Russian drone strike on a bus in Nikopol. In Russia, three people were killed in a Ukrainian drone strike on Vladimir Oblast.

Ust-Luga was attacked by drones according to Russian Telegram channels, footage showed explosions in the port area. Leningrad Oblast Governor Aleksandr Drozdenko claimed 22 drones were intercepted without specifying any casualties or damage.

The SBU seized a “foreign vessel” in Odesa which it claimed was linked to illegal exports of grain from occupied Crimea.

=== 8 April ===
An oil refinery in Merefa, Kharkiv Oblast, sustained significant damage following a Russian attack.

Ukrainian drones also struck the oil tanks at Feodosia. Atesh claimed to have carried out a sabotage attack on railway systems in Belgorod Oblast aimed at disrupting Russian supply lines towards Kupiansk.

=== 9 April ===
Russia and Ukraine announced a ceasefire for the duration of the Orthodox Easter holidays.

The remains of 1,000 Ukrainian soldiers were repatriated by Russia in exchange for 41 deceased Russian soldiers.

Ukrainian drones attacked the oil pumping station at the Krymsk Linear Production and Dispatching Station. The pumping station transfers oil from Novorossiysk to oil refineries in Ilsky and Afipsky. One person was killed by drone debris near Novorossiysk.

=== 10 April ===
Air defences were activated and explosions were reported in the cities of Kazan, Saransk, Gukovo and Volgograd. It was the first time that Kazan was under a missile and air raid alert since the full-scale invasion. Saransk reported a missile attack and a fire. In Gukovo a "powerful" explosion and fires were reported. Volgograd reported drone noises followed by five to seven explosions in the southern part of the city. The Volgograd-Tikhoretsk oil pipeline was hit and caught fire according to a Ukrainian official. Ukrainian drones struck two Lukoil owned oil drilling platforms in the Caspian Sea. One person was killed in a drone strike in Volzhsky, Volgograd Oblast.

The SBU said it had arrested a man from a "Balkan country" on suspicion of attempting to assassinate a Ukrainian naval officer on behalf of the FSB with a silenced pistol.

The Russian defense ministry claimed that Russian forces took the town of Myropilske, in Sumy Oblast.

=== 11 April ===
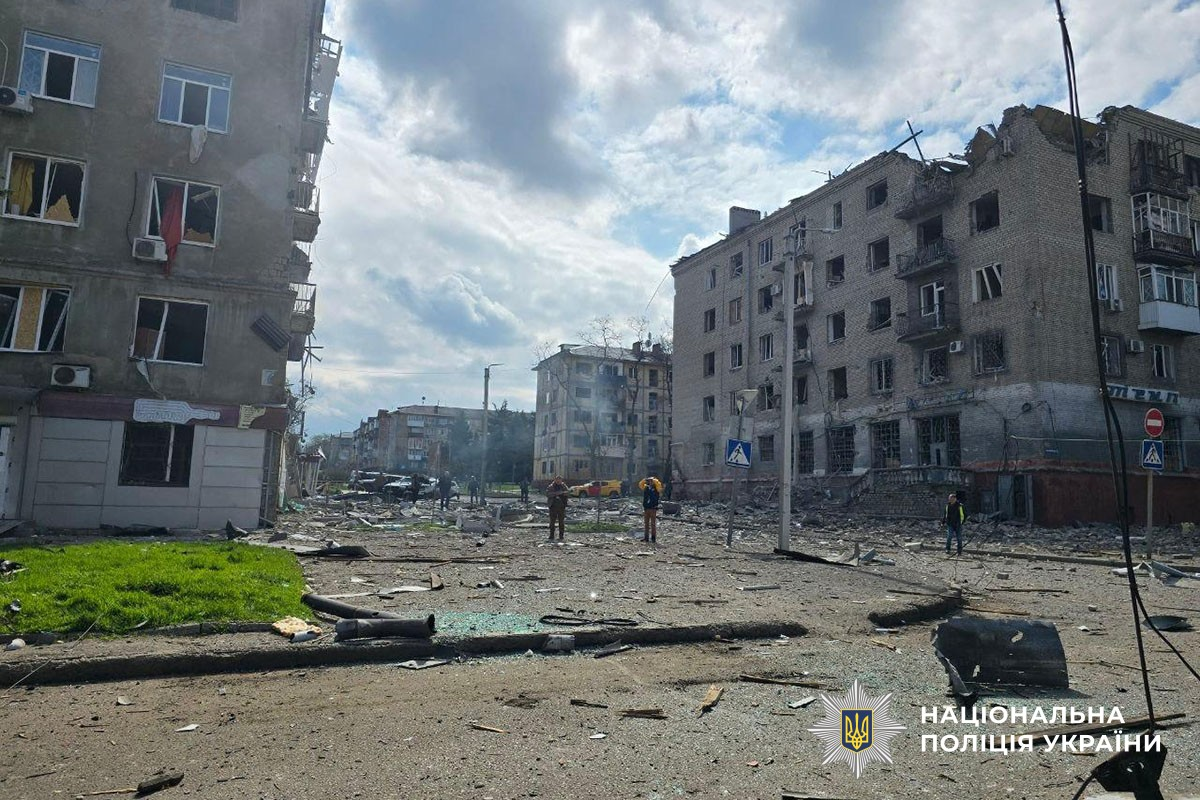
Street in Kramatorsk (Donetsk Oblast) after bombing on 11 April

Russia and Ukraine conducted a prisoner exchange that saw the release of 175 captives on each side.

Ukrainian drones struck the Krymskaya oil pumping station again. A drone attack resulted in three explosions in Tver.

Ukrainian prosecutors commenced a pre-trial investigation into Russian soldiers who executed four unarmed Ukrainian POWs in Kharkiv Oblast.

=== 12 April ===
Ukrainian officials reported 7,696 violations of the Russian Easter ceasefire, with four people dead and 35 injured in five regions. Russia also accused Ukraine of violating the ceasefire and injuring five people in attacks in two regions.

Atesh claimed to have carried out a sabotage attack on a locomotive in Rostov Oblast aimed at disrupting Russian supply lines towards Zaporizhzhia Oblast.

=== 13 April ===
The Ukrainian military confirmed its withdrawal from Myropilske in Sumy Oblast.

The SBU arrested a woman in Uzhhorod accused of fatally poisoning a Ukrainian serviceman she met on a dating site on behalf of Russia.

=== 14 April ===
Five people were killed in a Russian drone strike in Dnipro. Airstrikes were also carried out on the dam holding the Pechenihy Reservoir in Pechenihy, Kharkiv Oblast.

The governor of Lipetsk Oblast said one person was killed in a Ukrainian drone strike in Yelets. Ukrainian forces destroyed a UAV storage site, based at the Donetsk International Airport, using SCALP missiles and GBU-39 Small Diameter Bombs.

The Ukrainian military claimed that it intercepted Russian forces trying to infiltrate Ukrainian rear positions in Sumy Oblast using gas pipelines, killing 29 soldiers.

A Russian milblogger claimed that Russian forces took the town of Prokhody and most of Stepok east of Sumy city near the border.

=== 15 April ===
One person was killed in a Russian drone strike in Odesa. Another was killed in a separate drone strike in Cherkasy.

The Russian defense ministry claimed that Russian forces took the town of Vovchanski Khutory, east of Vovchansk.

Ukrainian drones struck a petrochemical plant in Sterlitamak, Bashkortostan. The republic's head, Radiy Khabirov, confirmed the attack on Telegram and claimed that a driver had been killed.

=== 16 April ===
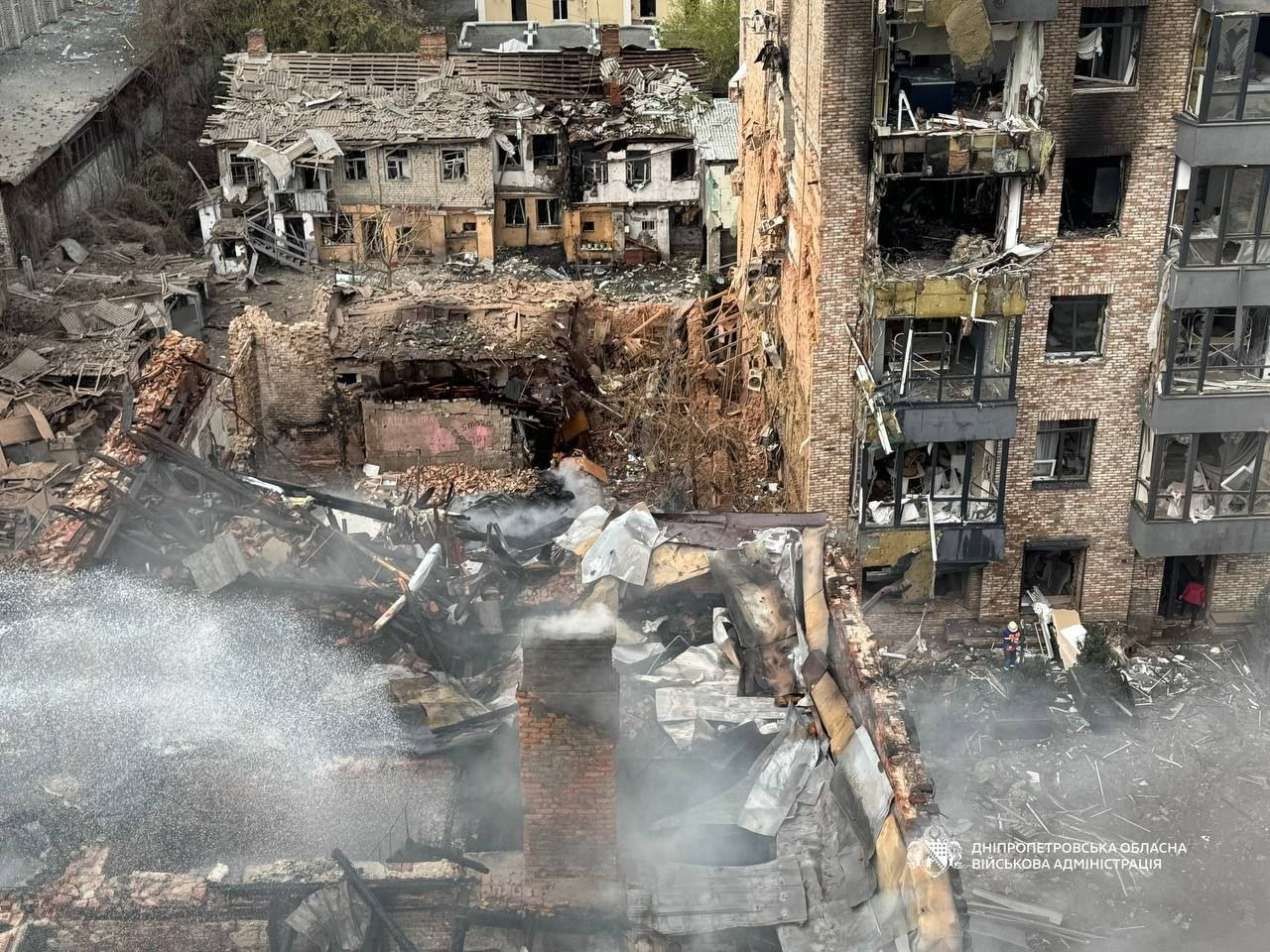
Buildings in Dnipro after the attack

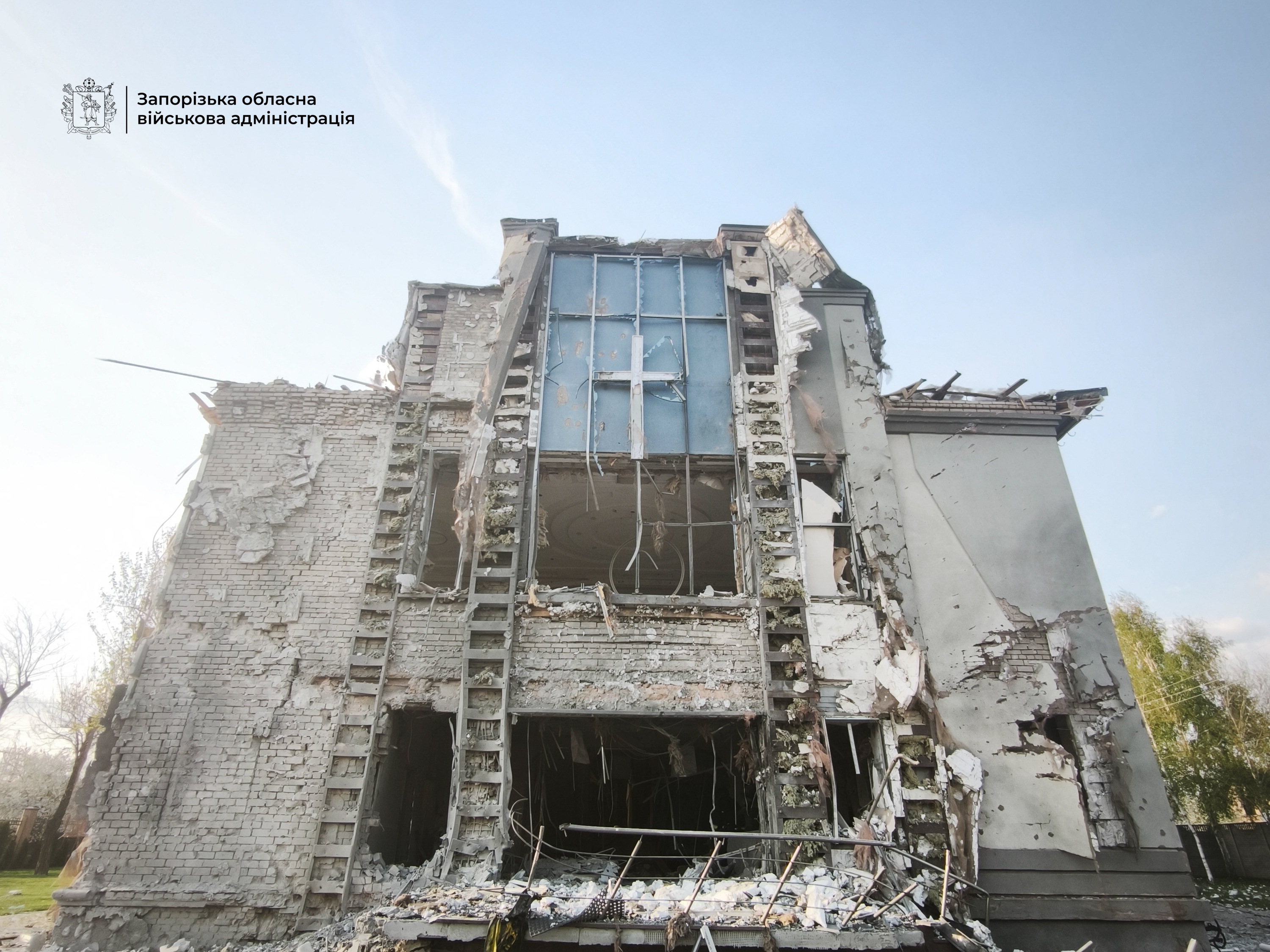
Church in Zaporizhzhia after bomb strike

Russia launched a mass wave of air attacks across Ukraine, killing 17 people in Kyiv, Odesa and Dnipro. This was Russia's most lethal attack so far this year. Drones also deployed Russian propaganda leaflets.

The Russian-chartered, Liberian-flagged tanker ANSHUN II was attacked by Ukrainian drones off the Black Sea coast of Krasnodar Krai, injuring the Turkish captain. Ukrainian drones struck the fuel tanks at Tuapse Oil Refinery resulting in several tanks being set ablaze. An electrical substation in Belgorod was set on fire by Ukrainian drones, resulting in power loss in nearby streets.

A court in occupied Luhansk Oblast sentenced a Polish national captured near Chasiv Yar in 2024 to 13 years' imprisonment for fighting on behalf on Ukraine.

Ukrainian forces for the first time seized Russian positions and forced Russian soldiers to surrender using only unmanned ground robots and aerial drones, no infantry were involved, according to President Zelenskyy.

Former Ukrainian soldier Ruslan Chorny-Shevets was sentenced to 18 years imprisonment by a Crimean court for charges of “state treason” by spying on Russian units for the SBU.

=== 17 April ===
The governor of Belgorod Oblast said one person was killed in a Ukrainian drone strike in Yasnye Zori.

The Russian defense ministry claimed that Russian forces took the town of Zybyne, east of Vovchansk.

=== 18 April ===
Ukrainian drones struck oil infrastructure in Sevastopol and Novofedorivka, locals reported explosions and air defences firing. A large fire was later reported in the port area of Kazachya Bay, Sevastopol. Another drone attack struck the Novokuibyshevsk Oil Refinery, with Russian Telegram channels reporting a large fire at the oil refinery. The Syzran oil refinery caught fire according to Ukrainian officials after a drone attack. The RPK Vysotsk Lukoil-2 oil terminal, in Leningrad Oblast, and the Tikhoretsk oil pumping station, in Krasnodar Krai, were attacked.

The FSB said it had thwarted a Ukrainian assassination plot targeting senior officials of Roskomnadzor following a shootout that left one suspect dead.

=== 19 April ===
Ukrainian Neptune missiles struck a factory in Taganrog used to build Russian UAVs, resulting in a fire. The HUR disabled two landing ships, the Yamal and the Nikolai Filchenkov, in Sevastopol Bay.

A Russian court sentenced a Ukrainian soldier captured in Kursk Oblast in 2025 to 15 years' imprisonment on charges of terrorism.

=== 20 April ===
Three people were killed in Russian drone strikes on Nikopol.

The oil facilities in Tuapse were set on fire by another drone attack. Governor Veniamin Kondratyev reported one person was killed.

The FSB arrested a German woman with an explosive in her backpack in Pyatigorsk. The FSB claimed that she was recruited by a citizen of a Central Asian country who was working for Ukrainian security services.

A Russian Shahed drone struck the Kyiv Oblast residence of Serhiy "Flash" Beskrestnov, a military communications expert and advisor to the Ukrainian Defense Ministry. Beskrestnov, who was injured in the attack, claimed it that the attack was specifically targeted at him.

=== 21 April ===
Ukrainian drones attacked rail infrastructure in Novocherkassk, halting several trains. Ukrainian drones struck the Samara oil distribution station, resulting in a “massive fire” that damaged at least five oil storage tanks.

The SBU said it has arrested a teenage suspect accused of plotting bomb attacks in Kremenchuk on behalf of Russia.

=== 22 April ===
Ukrainian drones hit a residential apartment building in Syzran, Samara Oblast, causing a partial collapse that killed two people and injured 12 others. Russian milbloggers claimed that the incident may have been caused by electronic warfare "suppressing" the drones. Ukrainian drones struck an FSB base in Donetsk, killing 12 FSB officers and wounding another 15.

=== 23 April ===
Three people were killed in a Russian drone strike on Dnipro.

Ukrainian drone attacks set fire to the Gorky pumping station in Kstovo and the oil depot at Feodosia. Three people were killed in separate drone strikes in Belgorod and Novokuibyshevsk, Samara Oblast, the latter targeting the Novokuybyshevsk Petrochemical Company, which manufacturers explosives for the Russian military. Another FSB base in Shchaslyvtseve, Kherson Oblast, was attacked by drones, killing two FSB officers, injuring 10, and destroying various barracks and cars.

The SBU and Ukrainian police said they had thwarted a Russian plot to carry out attacks on schools in Kirovohrad and Odesa oblasts using minors.

The European Union approved a €90 billion loan package ($106 billion; £76 billion; 4.6 trillion hryvnia) for Ukraine and the 20th sanctions package against Russia.

=== 24 April ===
Two people were killed in a Russian drone strike on Odesa.

The commanders of the Ukrainian 10th Army Corps, Anatolii Lysetskyi, and the 14th Separate Mechanized Brigade, Serhii Perts, were dismissed amid controversy following the release of pictures showing soldiers in substandard living conditions at the Kharkiv front.

Ukraine and Russia each exchanged 193 POWs in an exchange facilitated by the United States and the United Arab Emirates.

Six Ukrainian FP-2 drones struck a command post of the 58th Guards Combined Arms Army in Kadiivka.

=== 25 April ===
Yekaterinburg was attacked by Ukrainian drones according to the Governor of Sverdlovsk Oblast, Denis Pasler, injuring six. The Chelyabinsk Metallurgical Plant in Chelyabinsk Oblast, was attacked. It was the first time these regions had came under attack by Ukrainian drones. Chelyabinsk Shagol Airport was attacked by Ukrainian drones, damaging two Su-57s, two Su-34s and support equipment.

Eight people were killed and 56 wounded after Russian strikes in Dnipro. Two people were killed in a drone strike in Nizhyn. In Zaporizhzhia, a strike on a minibus killed one person and injured four more.

=== 26 April ===
One person was killed in a Ukrainian drone strike on Sevastopol.

In Russia, some 15 explosions were reported at the Yaroslavl oil refinery during a Ukrainian drone attack, resulting in a large fire. Drones struck the Apatit chemical plant in Cherepovets, which resulted in a pipeline carrying sulfuric acid rupturing and burning five people who required hospitalisation, according to the regional governor. SBU drones damaged the reconnaissance ship Ivan Khurs, the large landing ship Nikolai Filchenkov and the large landing ship Yamal in Sevastopol. A Russian MiG-31 was damaged at Belbek airfield.

=== 27 April ===
Two people were killed in a Ukrainian drone strike on Dnipriany, Kherson Oblast. One person was killed in a drone strike on a transport workshop near the Zaporizhzhia Nuclear Power Plant.

President Zelenskyy accused President Putin of "nuclear terrorism" after Russia conducted military operations in the vicinity of the Chernobyl exclusion zone.

The Russian defense ministry claimed that Russian forces took the town of Ozerne, south of Lyman.

=== 28 April ===
Ukrainian drones struck the Tuapse oil refinery and oil terminal. Locals reported explosions and a fire. Local airports also suspended flights. Krasnodar Krai Governor Veniamin Kondratyev announced an evacuation for residents living near the oil refinery, while more than 120 firefighters and 39 pieces of equipment were deployed to fight the fire. Ukrainian drones struck reinforced bunkers that were claimed to have stored Iskander missiles in Ovrazhky, about 40 km (25 mi) east of Simferopol. Fires were later reported at the site by NASA FIRMS.

The Russian defense ministry claimed that Russian forces took the town of Zemlianky in Kharkiv Oblast near the Russia-Ukraine border.

Major General Azatbek Omurbekov, a former commander of the 64th Separate Guards Motor Rifle Brigade who was involved in the Bucha massacre, survived a bomb explosion near his residence in Khabarovsk that killed his Chief of Staff, Lieutenant Colonel Sergey Kuzmenko.

=== 29 April ===
Ukrainian drones attacked the Orsknefteorgsintez oil refinery, in Orsk, and an oil pipeline in Perm was set on fire. Ukrainian naval drones struck the stern of the shadow fleet tanker MARQUISE; leaving it drifting 210 kilometres (130 mi) from Tuapse. The Unmanned Systems Forces (Ukraine) destroyed four helicopters, two Mi-28s and two Mi-17s, while refuelling in Voronezh Oblast using drones.

Ukrainian intelligence claimed that North Korean forces had deployed 14,061 personnel against Ukraine, suffering 7,058 combat casualties, including 2,251 killed and 4,807 wounded, in the fighting.

=== 30 April ===
Ukrainian drones struck an explosives factory in Dzerzhinsk, Russia. Telegram channel Exilenova Plus reported further explosions in Novgorod Oblast. The Ukrainian Navy claimed to have struck two FSB boats, a Grachonok-class patrol boat and a Sobol-class patrol boat, that were guarding the Crimean Bridge with naval drones. The Ukrainian Navy claimed that both ships were damaged while the crew suffered wounded and killed. Ukrainian drones struck the oil refinery in Perm again, at least four fuel storage tanks exploded and two distillation columns were damaged.

The Russian defense ministry claimed that Russian forces took the town of Korchakivka, in Sumy Oblast.

Russian drones struck Odesa overnight, injuring at least 20 people.

== May 2026 ==
=== 1 May ===
Ukrainian drones struck the oil refinery at Tuapse again, reigniting fires that had been put out.

The Russian defense ministry claimed that Russian forces took the town of Pokaliane, southeast of Vovchansk.

The HUR claimed to have conducted strikes against Chechen Akhmat positions in the Sumy direction with the assistance of a Chechen double-agent, leaving 41 Chechens dead and 87 wounded, and 160 vehicles and 25 drones plus other equipment hit.

=== 2 May ===
Two people were killed in a Russian drone strike in Kherson.

Geolocated footage showed that Russian forces took the town of Novoserhiivka in Donetsk Oblast, and the Russian defense ministry claimed that Russian forces took the town of Myropillia in Sumy Oblast.

Ukrainian forces struck Iskander missile systems near Druzhne, Crimea, as well as various UAV control points, repair plants and radars across the Crimean peninsula. Primorsk was attacked by “Liutyi-looking strike drones” according to a Telegram channel. Another channel reported attacks on the port. NASA FIRMS later showed a fire at the Primorsk oil export terminal. The oil loading pier was damaged, as was a shadow fleet tanker, a patrol boat and a Karakurt-class corvette, which is capable of launching Kalibr missiles.

=== 3 May ===
Four people were killed in Russian attacks on Odesa and Kherson oblasts.

Ukrainian naval drones attacked and disabled two shadow fleet tankers in Novorossiysk’s port.

=== 4 May ===
Seven people were killed in a Russian missile attack on Merefa, Kharkiv Oblast.

The House on Mosfilmovskaya, a Moscow skyscraper, was damaged by a Ukrainian drone. In Belgorod Oblast, one person was killed in a Ukrainian attack on Batratskaya Dacha.

President Putin announced a two-day truce in the war with Ukraine on 8 and 9 May to mark Victory Day in World War II. President Zelenskyy announced a two-day truce in the war with Russia on 5 and 6 May.

=== 5 May ===
Seventeen people were killed in Russian airstrikes on Kramatorsk and Zaporizhzhia. Four people, including rescue worker and Hero of Ukraine recipient Viktor Kuzmenko, were killed in a Russian double tap strike on a gas production facility in Poltava Oblast.

Russian attacks near the Chernihiv Oblast sector of the Ukrainian border caused a massive forest fire that reached up to 4,300 ha (11,000 acres) in size.

Five people were killed in a Ukrainian drone attack on Dzhankoi, Crimea.

In Chuvashia, the JSC VNIIR-Progress missile plant in Cheboksary was attacked with video on social media showing a large fire. The plant manufactures Kometa antennas, which are used in guided missiles and in electronic warfare systems. Six Ukrainian Flamingo missiles and an An-196 Liutyi struck the plant. At least two people were killed and 32 were injured in a separate attack on the city. A missile alert was issued for 18 regions, including Khanty-Mansi for the first time, some 2,000 km (1,200 mi) from the Ukrainian border. Ukrainian drones also set fire to the Kirishinefteorgsintez oil refinery in Kirishi. "Half" of the FSB regional office in Armiansk was destroyed by Ukrainian drones.

=== 7 May ===
Ukrainian Liutyi drones struck an oil refinery and pumping station in Perm. Footage online and NASA's FIRMS system reported that at least one storage tank caught fire. A Russian military logistics facility in Naro-Fominsk was also attacked by Ukrainian drones, with locals reporting explosions. A Karakurt-class corvette in the Caspian Sea was struck by a drone. The Ukrainian General Staff claimed it could carry Kalibr cruise missiles. One person was killed and two others were injured in a drone strike on a minibus in Voznesenovka, Belgorod Oblast.

The SBU arrested a soldier of the 210th Battalion in Dnipropetrovsk Oblast for beating a soldier of the 155th Mechanized Brigade.

=== 8 May ===
Ukrainian drones set fire to the Yaroslavnefteorgsintez oil refinery in Yaroslavl. A “Rostovagropromspare enterprise” in Rostov-on-Don was set on fire after locals reported explosions. Moscow mayor Sobyanin confirmed that drones were shot down over the capital, with Vnukovo and Domodedovo airports suspending flights. In Grozny, a drone landed at the garrison of the 42nd Guards Motor Rifle Division in Khankala, a second landed close to an FSB office. Both targets were near Ramzan Kadyrov’s residence. Ukrainian drones struck the Perm refinery for a third time in nine days, starting a fire. An drone attack on the air traffic control center in Rostov-on-Don paralyzed civil aviation through much of southern Russia.

US President Donald Trump said that Presidents Putin and Zelenskyy agreed to his proposal for a three-day truce beginning on the next day and an exchange of 1,000 POWs between Russia and Ukraine.

The Russian defense ministry claimed that Russian forces took the town of Kryva Luka, east of Sloviansk.

=== 10 May ===
Atesh claimed to have carried out a sabotage attack on a train used by Russian forces southeast of Lipetsk.

=== 12 May ===
Two people were killed in a Russian attack on Kryvyi Rih.

Russian milbloggers claimed that Russian forces seized Chaikivka, east of Vovchansk.

Ukrainian drones attacked the Orsknefteorgsintez gas industry facility in Orenburg Oblast. The local governor claimed that civilian buildings were damaged but no casualties. Telegram channel Astra reported that a drone attack on the Strela production plant in Orenburg, which makes military aircraft components, was foiled by possible electronic warfare. A Ukrainian drone attacked an air defence system, in Crimea, using unguided missiles for the first time. Ukrainian drones struck a PRV-16 radar altimeter near Huselske and possibly a P-18 radar near Zelenyi Yar. The Russian commander of the "Yugra" battalion, Lt. Col. Oleg Rudomyotov, was killed by a Ukrainian drone strike in Donetsk.

=== 13 May ===
Russia carried out a massive air attack across Ukraine, killing 14 people including eight in Dnipropetrovsk Oblast and three in Rivne Oblast. The Hungarian government summoned the Russian ambassador in protest after an attack hit Uzhhorod, the capital of the Hungarian minority-inhabited Zakarpattia Oblast, for the first time since the start of the war.

Ukrainian drones struck “oil shipping infrastructure” in the village of Volna, Krasnodar Krai. NASA FIRMS reported a fire in the area, and the Krasnodar Krai Operational Headquarters reported that a civilian was wounded in the attack. Ukrainian drones attacked an “industrial enterprise” in Yaroslavl which made components for air defense and electronic warfare systems, with video showing the enterprise on fire. According to Reuters, Ukrainian attacks forced the suspension of production at the Permnefteorgsintez oil refinery in Perm, with repairs taking “several weeks”. The Astrakhan gas processing plant was attacked by Ukrainian drones, according to a Russian official all drones were shot down or “suppressed” by electronic warfare. However falling debris started a fire on the premises.

The Moscow City Government banned the publication of any footage showing the consequences of any Ukrainian attacks on the capital without official permission.

=== 14 May ===
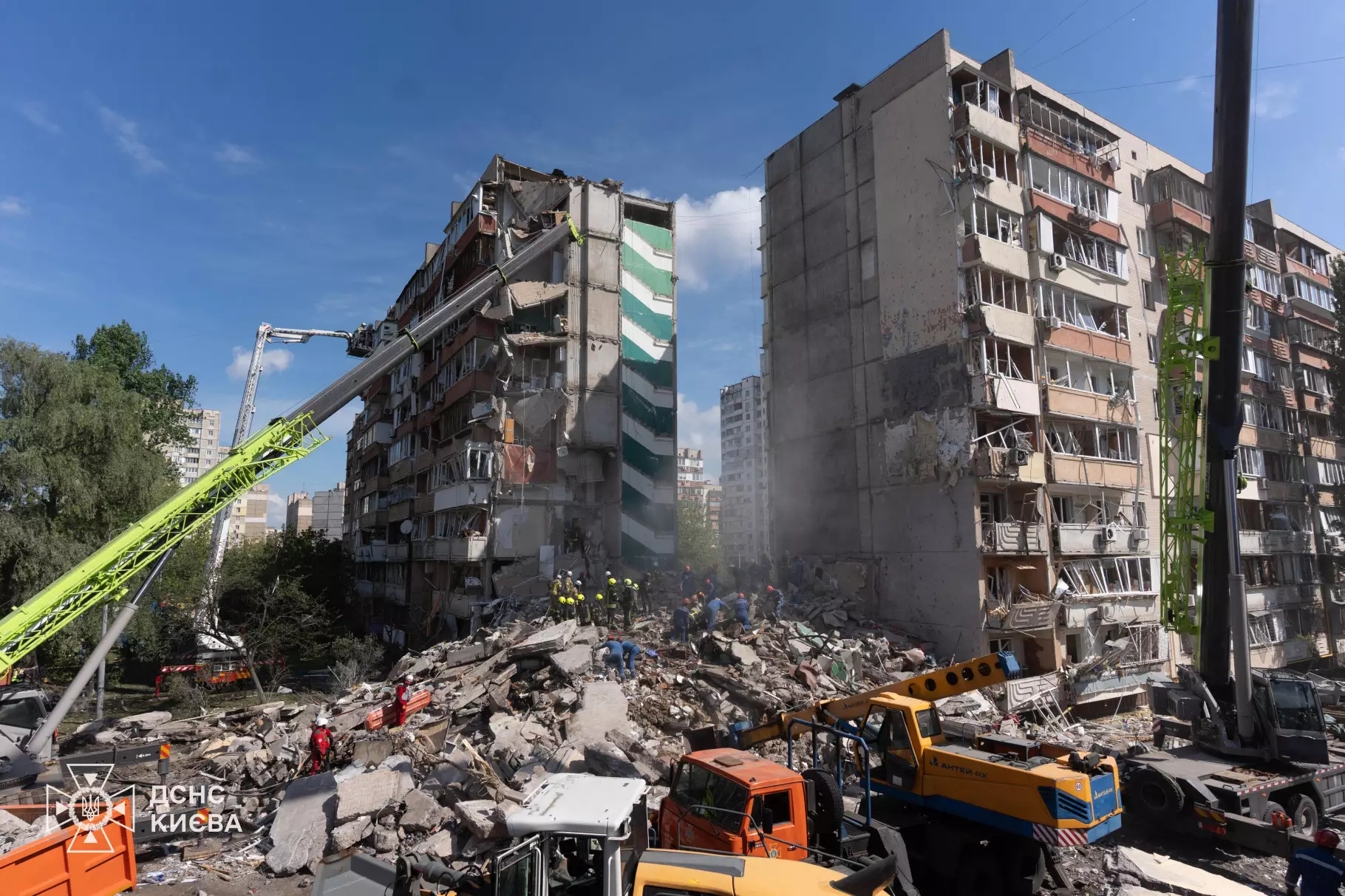
Apartment building in Kyiv after the attack

At least 24 people were killed in a Russian missile attack on Kyiv.

An FAB-500 bomb fell off a Russian aircraft in Yakovlevsky District, Belgorod Oblast, landing in a railway track without exploding. The bomb then derailed a passenger train with some 15 people on board, injuring a 75-year-old woman.

The Russian defense ministry claimed that Russian forces took the town of Mykolaivka, west of Chasiv Yar and Shesterivka, south of Vovchansk.

=== 15 May ===
Ukrainian drones attacked the Ryazan oil refinery, starting a large fire. The local governor claimed that four people were killed and 12 injured during the attack. Five drones were shot down as they approached Moscow, according to the city's mayor, with Domodedovo and Sheremetyevo airports suspending flights. An airbase near Yeysk was attacked, with drones damaging a Ka-27 and destroying a Be-200. The Belgorod thermal power plant was struck by Ukrainian missiles. Ukrainian drones damaged a Russian missile ship and a minesweeper at the Kaspiysk naval base.

The first Ukrainian 205 POWs were returned as part of the 1,000 for 1,000 prisoner swap agreed as part of the 9–11 May ceasefire.

=== 16 May ===
Nevinnomyssk Azot chemical plant was set on fire by Ukrainian drones. There was also a drone threat and a fire in Naberezhnye Chelny. One person was killed in a drone strike in Krasnaya Yaruga, Belgorod Oblast.

Ukraine repatriated 528 bodies of people killed in the war from Russia.

An aerial bomb from a Russian plane fell on a residence in Dubovoye, Belgorod Oblast, killing one person.

=== 17 May ===
Nearly 600 Ukrainian drones attacked Moscow and Moscow Oblast. The Russian MoD reported intercepting some 556 drones over the capital and other nearby areas. Targeted were the Solnechnogorsk oil terminal, Elma Technology Park in Zelenograd and the Angstrom JSC. Three people were killed in drone strikes in Khimki and Pogorelki in Moscow Oblast, while 12 others were injured. Ukrainian drones struck a Project 10410 Svetlyak patrol ship near Kaspiysk.

=== 18 May ===
The HUR claimed that Ukrainian forces retook Stepnohirsk in Zaporizhzhia Oblast.

Two people were killed and two people were injured in a Ukrainian drone strike in Borisovka, Belgorod Oblast.

An FSB patrol ship, a Project 21980 "Grachonok", was attacked by Ukrainian drones in Kaspiysk.

=== 19 May ===
Three people were killed in a Russian airstrike on Pryluky, Chernihiv Oblast. A separate attack on Hlukhiv in Sumy Oblast killed two. Ukrainian drones set fire to an oil refinery in Yaroslavl.

A suspected Ukrainian drone was shot down by a Romanian fighter jet belonging to a NATO contingent over Estonian airspace. Ukraine issued an apology and blamed the incident on Russian interference.

Ukraine announced the operational deployment of a domestically manufactured glide bomb called Вирівнювач (Vyrivniuvach) or Equaliser (or Leveler). It has a 250 kg (550 lb) warhead, a range of “dozens of kilometers” and a third of the cost of a JDAM-ER. It is an analogue to a JDAM-ER or Russian KAB.

=== 20 May ===
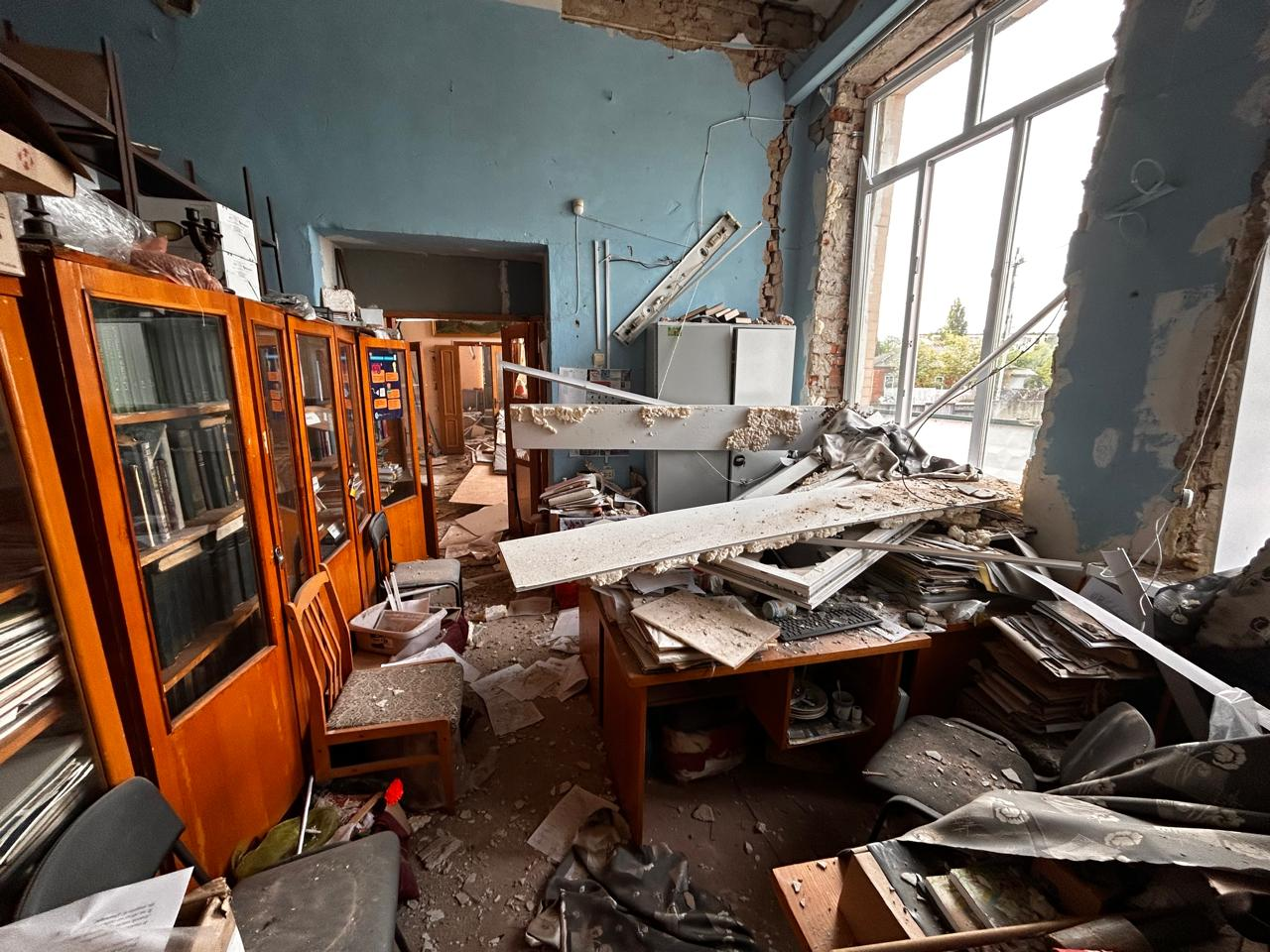
Konotop Local History Museum after the attack on 20 May

Ukrainian drones struck the Lukoil factory in Kstovo, starting a fire. Nevinnomyssky Azot chemical plant was attacked by drones, starting a fire at the premises. The commander of Ukraine’s Unmanned Systems Forces, Robert Brovdi, claimed that Ukrainian drones struck a Russian drone training centre in Snizhne, used by the 78th Motorized Special Purpose Regiment "North-Akhmat". Some 65 cadets were killed along with the commander and a Russian officer.

=== 21 May ===
The Russian-appointed governor of Kherson Oblast, Vladimir Saldo, restricted civilian truck movements on the R-280 highway, better known as the Highway of Death as a result of Ukraine's middle strike campaign in mid-to-late May 2026, when dozens of Russian military supply vehicles were destroyed by Ukrainian drones along this highway between Russia and Simferopol via Mariupol and Melitopol.

Two people were killed in a Ukrainian drone strike on Syzran, Samara Oblast. The Syzran oil refinery was attacked by Ukrainian drones, starting a large fire. Russian Railways said that a Ukrainian drone strike on railway workers at the Unecha station in Bryansk Oblast killed three people and hit a switcher locomotive.

An FSB base was attacked by drones in Kherson Oblast, with some 100 wounded and killed. A Pantsir-S1 was also destroyed.

=== 22 May ===
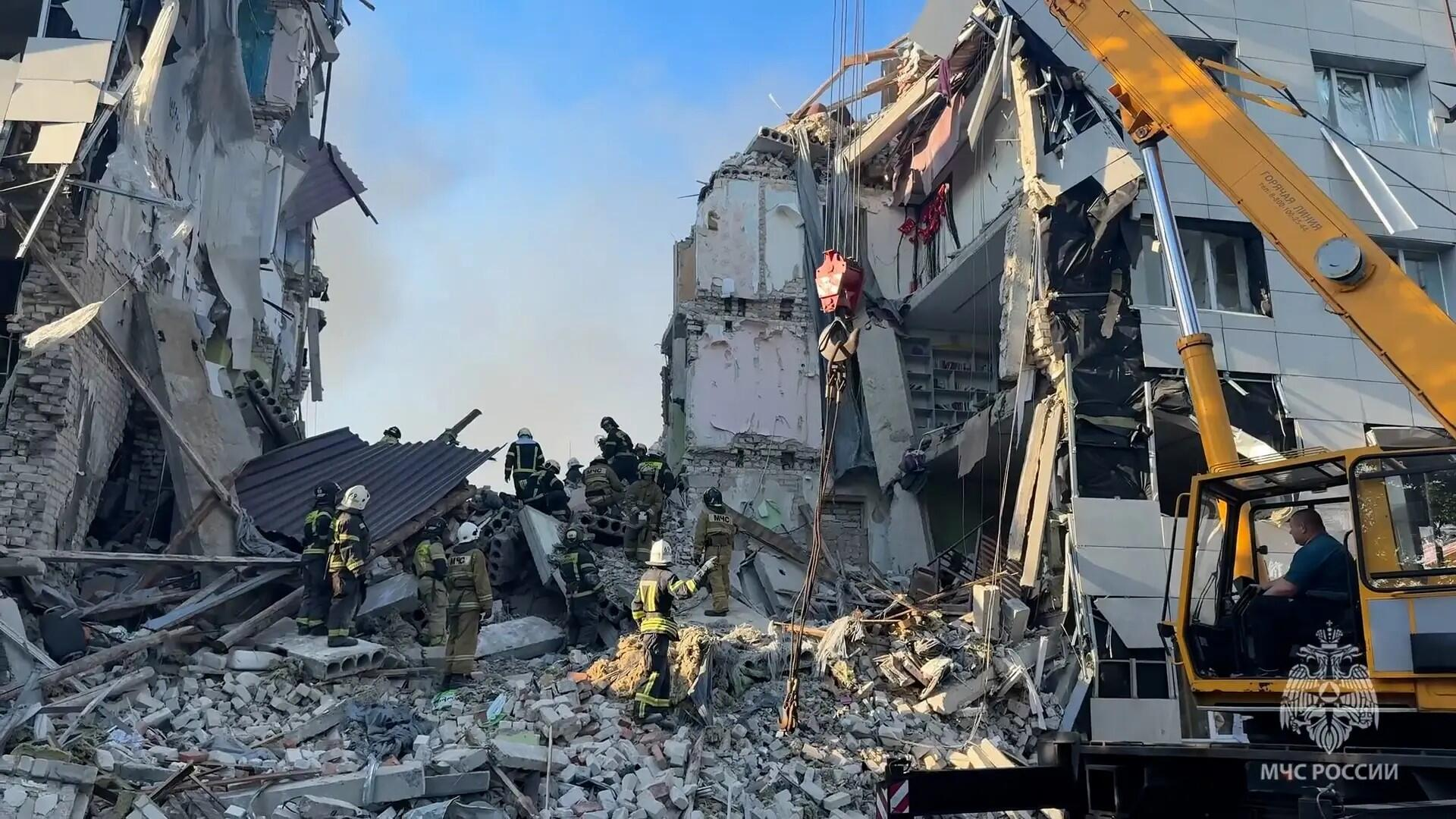
Starobilsk after attack

Twenty-one people were killed while 42 others were injured in a Ukrainian drone strike on the Starobilsk College of Luhansk Pedagogical University, Luhansk Oblast.

Ukrainian drones struck the Yaroslavl oil refinery, with reports of explosions shutting road traffic to Moscow and forcing the local airport to temporarily suspend flights. NASA FIRMS reported a fire at Taganrog-Central air base, local Telegram channels reported a drone threat.

The U.S. State Department approved a sale of HAWK missiles to Ukraine.

The Russian Defense Ministry claimed that Russian forces took the town of Verkhnia Tersa, northwest of Huliaipole.

=== 23 May ===
Ukrainian drones struck the oil refinery in Novorossiysk, causing a fire at the Grushovaya oil terminal. Ukrainian drones also struck the Admiral Essen and a Project 1239 missile corvette. A Krivak-class frigate was also struck by FP-1/2 drone. Ukrainian drones set fire to the Metafrax chemical plant in Gubakha.

=== 24 May ===
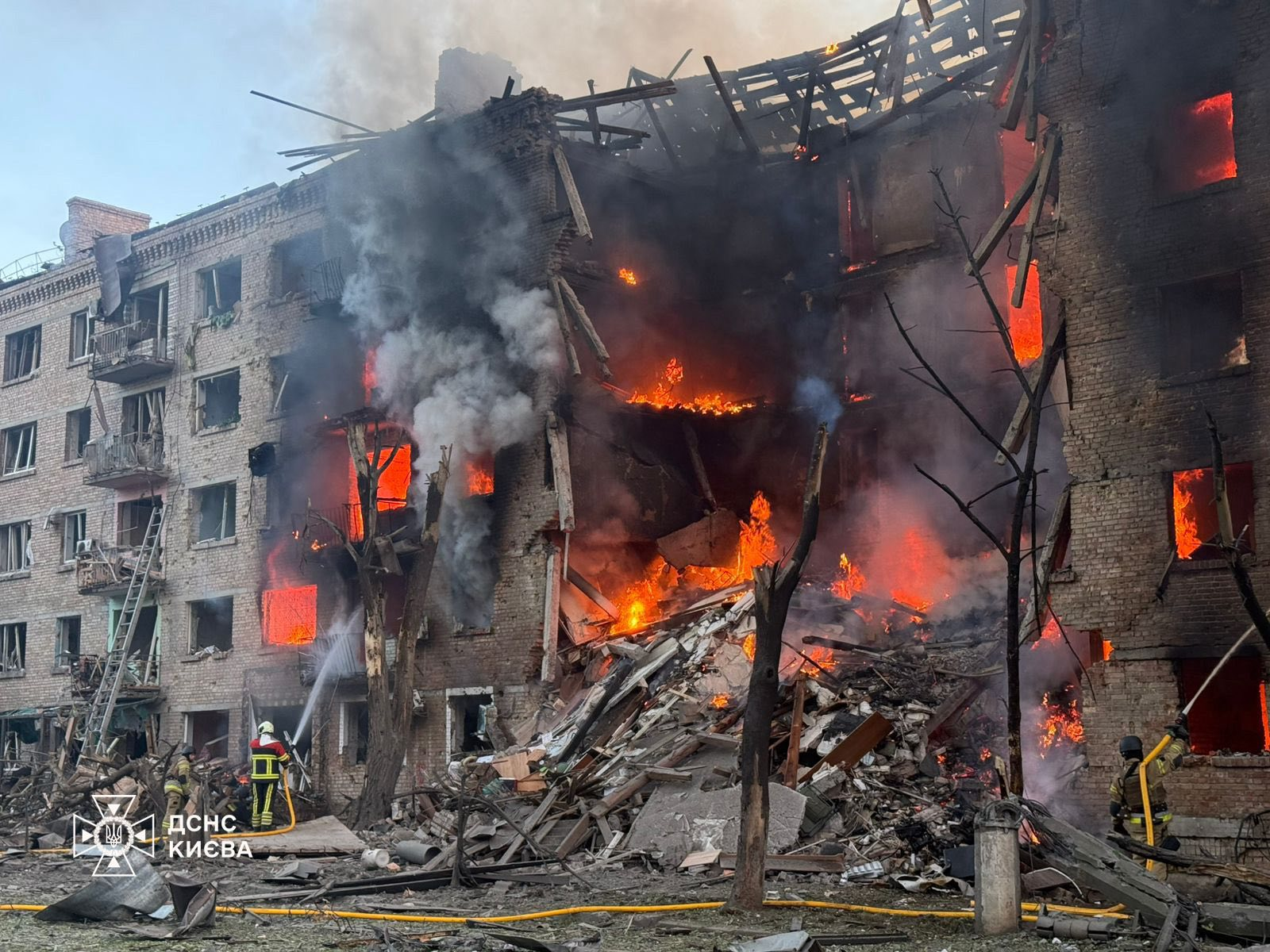
Apartment building in Kyiv after the attack

Russia fired 600 drones and 90 missiles in an overnight attack on Ukraine. Ukrainian air defenses intercepted 549 drones and 55 missiles, while 19 missiles failed to reach their targets. The attack killed at least four people and wounded more than 90 others, while the National Art Museum of Ukraine was damaged and the Ukrainian National Chernobyl Museum was destroyed. Russia also fired a hypersonic Oreshnik ballistic missile from its Kapustin Yar test site during the attack.

Ukrainian drones struck the Vtorovo oil pumping station, with locals reporting heavy smoke over the facility. The Kuban Partisan Movement claimed responsibility for a fire at the Primorsko-Akhtarsk air base. NASA FIRMS reported “abnormal heat activity” at the facility. Two Ukrainian drones struck a train in Kursk Oblast, resulting in a gas explosion that led to the evacuation of 76 people in a nearby settlement. A Ukrainian airstrike hit a UAV control point in Tyotkino.

A Russian milblogger claimed that Russian forces took the town of Vasylivka, north of Hryshyne, Donetsk Oblast.

=== 25 May ===
Ukrainian missile strikes disrupted power and water supply in Belgorod. A drone attack also stopped traffic between Yaroslavl and Moscow. Storm Shadow missiles struck a command post in Luhansk Oblast. Two people were killed in Ukrainian attacks on Belgorod and Bryansk oblasts.

A ban was ordered on civilian flights for altitudes of up to 5,100 m (16,700 ft) over Russian airspace, with exceptions including charter and medical purposes. The area affected ranges from Yekaterinburg in the northeast, the Belarus border in the west, St. Petersburg in the north and Samara in the south. The ban will be in place “until the end of hostilities.”

A Russian milblogger claimed that Russian forces regained control of Odradne, east of Velykyi Burluk.

=== 27 May ===
One person was killed in a Russian airstrike on Kherson.

Ukrainian drones and missiles struck a Rosneft oil refinery in Tuapse and an aircraft repair plant in Taganrog. Baltimor airbase was attacked with missiles, with Russian Telegram channels reporting explosions and “two high-speed aerial targets” shot down over Voronezh. Storm Shadow missiles struck the Russian Black Sea Fleet Air Force in Sevastopol.

=== 28 May ===
Sweden announced the transfer 16 of used Saab JAS 39 Gripen C/D jet fighters to Ukraine, with another 20 newer Gripen E/F to be purchased using funds from the European Union.

Three oil tankers, the James II, Altura and Velora, were struck by drones 80 km (50 mi) from Turkeli. All three are listed as being part of the Russian shadow fleet.

=== 29 May ===
A Russian drone violated Romanian airspace during a Russian strike on Izmail and hit a block of flats in Galați, injuring two people.

DeepstateUA reported that Ukrainian forces had retaken Novoselivka in Dnipropetrovsk Oblast.

A Russian drone strike damaged a Turkish ship sailing from Odesa and injured its crew.

Ukrainian drones set fire to an "industrial fuel storage facilities" in Yaroslavl, blocking traffic to Moscow for several hours. Ukrainian drones also set fire to the Volgograd refinery and to the port of Temryuk. Three people were killed in Ukrainian drone strikes on Bryansk and Volgograd oblasts. The Yamalo-Nenets Autonomous Okrug issued a missile alert for the first time since the full scale war started.

Russian authorities introduced a mechanism that allows private companies to purchase equipment to prevent Ukrainian drone attacks. To protect industrial enterprises companies can purchase "anti-aircraft artillery mounts, turrets, radar equipment, specialized vehicles, and electronic warfare systems" the companies are also allowed to establish "mobile fire groups".

Japan contributed $14 million in non-lethal aid for Ukraine through the PURL.

=== 30 May ===
The IAEA, citing Rosatom, said that a drone strike hit the turbine building of the Zaporizhzhia Nuclear Power Plant, creating a hole in a wall.

Ukrainian Unmanned Systems Forces commander Robert Brovdi claimed that Ukrainian drones destroyed an Iskander ballistic missile system and two Tu-142s at the airfield in Taganrog. Ukrainian drones struck oil refineries in Taganrog, Rostov, Armavir and Krasnodar. In Rostov Oblast a fuel storage tank and a tanker were set ablaze. In Taganrog loading infrastructure at the pier was damaged. In Armavir, a fire was reported at the Yuzhnaya Neftyanaya Kompaniya oil refinery. Ukrainian drones struck the Saratov Oil Refinery.

The HUR claimed to have started deploying drones that can travel some 3,500 km (2,200 mi), allowing them to reach Krasnoyarsk, in Siberia, for strike missions.

=== 31 May ===
The Lazarevo oil pumping station was attacked by Ukrainian drones, resulting in a fire. The Ukrainian Navy fired Neptune missiles at Novoshakhtinsk refinery, striking two crude distillation units and starting a fire.
