= Dolynske rural hromada, Zaporizhzhia Oblast =

Dolynske rural hromada Долинська селищна громада
- Hromada
- Interactive map of Dolynske rural hromada
- Country: Ukraine
- Oblast: Zaporizhzhia Oblast
- Raion: Zaporizhzhia Raion

Area
  - Total: 170.1 km^{2} (65.7 sq mi)

Population (2020)
  - Total: 5,696
  - Density: 33.49/km^{2} (86.73/sq mi)
- Settlements: 9
- Rural settlements: 2
- Villages: 7

Dolynske rural hromada (Ukrainian: Долинська селищна громада) is a hromada of Ukraine, located in Zaporizhzhia Raion, Zaporizhzhia Oblast. Its administrative center is the village of Dolynske.

It has an area of 170.1 square kilometres (65.7 mi^{2}) and a population of 5,696, as of 2020.

The hromada contains 9 settlements, including 7 villages:

- Baburka
- Dolynske
- Nyzhnia Khortytsia
- Nove Zaporizhzhia
- Novoslobidka
- Rozumivka
- Khortytsia

And 2 rural-type settlements: Vysokohirne and Kantserivka.

== See also ==
- List of hromadas of Ukraine
