= Bilenke =

Bilenke (Ukrainian: Біленьке) or Belenkoye (Russian: Беленькое) may refer to:

Localities

- Belenkoye, Altai Krai, village in Uglovsky District, Altai Krai, Russia
- Belenkoye, Belgorod Oblast, village in Borisovsky District, Belgorod Oblast, Russia
- Bilenke, Donetsk Oblast, urban-type settlement in Donetsk Oblast, Ukraine
- Bilenke, Kherson Oblast, village in Skadovsk Raion, Kherson Oblast, Ukraine
- Bilenke, Luhansk Oblast, village in Krasnodon Raion, Luhansk Oblast, Ukraine
- Bilenke, Odesa Oblast, village in Bilhorod-Dnistrovskyi Raion, Odesa Oblast, Ukraine
- Bilenke, Zaporizhzhia Oblast, village in Zaporizhzhia Raion, Zaporizhzhia Oblast, Ukraine
- Bilenke Pershe, village in Zaporizhzhia Raion, Zaporizhzhia Oblast, Ukraine

Bodies of water

- Belenkoye (lake, Slavgorod Municipality), a lake in Altai Krai, Russia
- Belenkoye (lake, Tabunsky District), a lake in Altai Krai, Russia
