= Khortytsia (disambiguation) =

Khortytsia is a large island on the Dnieper River in Ukraine.

Khortytsia may also refer to:

- Khortytsia Castle, a castle reportedly built on "Little Khortytsia Island" in the 1550s by Dmytro Vyshnevetsky ("Baida")
- Khortytsia, Zaporizhzhia Raion, a village in Zaporizhzhia Oblast
- Khortytsia Raion, a district of the city of Zaporizhzhia
- Khortytsia (company), a Ukrainian company that produces alcoholic beverages, in particular horilkas
- Chortitza Colony, a Russian Mennonite community located at Khortytsia Island

== See also ==
- Mennonite settlements in Canada:
  - Chortitz, Manitoba, in the Rural Municipality of Stanley
  - Randolph, Manitoba, formerly known as Chortitz, in the Rural Municipality of Hanover
  - Chortitz, Saskatchewan, in Rural Municipality of Coulee No. 136
- Chortitzer Mennonite Conference, a group of Mennonite churches in western Canada
  - Chortitz Heritage Church
