= Bilenke, Zaporizhzhia Oblast =

Bilenke Біленьке
- Village
- Location of Bilenke in Ukraine Location of Bilenke in Zaporizhzhia Oblast
- Coordinates: 47°37′26″N 35°02′46″E
- Country: Ukraine
- Oblast: Zaporizhzhia Oblast
- Raion: Zaporizhzhia Raion
- Hromada: Bilenke rural hromada
- Founded: 1770

Area
  - Total: 81.74 km^{2} (31.56 sq mi)
- Elevation: 17 m (56 ft)

Population (2001)
  - Total: 4,976
  - Density: 60.88/km^{2} (157.7/sq mi)
- Time zone: UTC+2 (EET)
  - Summer (DST): UTC+3 (EEST)
- Postal code: 70441
- Area code: +380 612
- Climate: Dfa
- Website: http://rada.gov.ua/

Bilenke (Ukrainian: Біленьке; Russian: Беленькое, romanized: Belenkoye) is a village (a selo) in the Zaporizhzhia Raion (district) of Zaporizhzhia Oblast in southern Ukraine. Its population was 4,976 in the 2001 Ukrainian Census. Bilenke was the administrative center of the Bilenke Rural Council, a local government area before its abolishment in 2020.

Penal colony No.99 is located in Bilenke. On 28 July 2025 it was bombed by Russian army, 16 people died and more than 50 were injured.

== See also ==
- Bilenke Pershe
