= Khortytsia, Zaporizhzhia Oblast =

Khortytsia Хортиця
- Village
- Location of Khortytsia in Zaporizhzhia Oblast Khortytsia (Zaporizhzhia Oblast)
- Coordinates: 47°50′58″N 35°0′55″E
- Country: Ukraine
- Oblast: Zaporizhzhia Oblast
- District: Zaporizhzhia Raion
- Council: Dolynske Rural Council
- Elevation: 62 m (203 ft)

Population (2016)
  - Total: 80
- Time zone: UTC+2 (EET)
  - Summer (DST): UTC+3 (EEST)
- Postal code: 70420
- Area code: +380 612

Khortytsia (Ukrainian: Хортиця) is a village (a selo) in the Zaporizhzhia Raion (district) of Zaporizhzhia Oblast in southern Ukraine.

== History ==
Khortytsia was built in 1789 by Mennonites settling in the Chortitza Colony and bore the German name Chortitza. Until World War I, there was a lively development of the village, after the war, the village had to suffer from the 1920s and collectivization in 1930. When World War II began in 1941, the residents of Khortytsia were to be deported to Siberia according to the will of the Soviet government. Since the Wehrmacht progressed very quickly, these plans were not realized. Under the German occupation, the population of Chortitza was able to recover somewhat. But as early as 1943, the German population had to be evacuated to Reichsgau Wartheland because the Wehrmacht had to withdraw from the Soviet Union.

After the end of the Second World War, the place became part of the city of Zaporizhzhia, but on 18 December 2008, the place was again independent at the decision of the Verkhovna Rada and the Dolynske district council.

On May 24, 2016, the village became part of the newly founded rural community of Dolynske, until then it was part of the Dolynske district council in the west of the Zaporizhzhia Raion.
