= Chervonodniprovka =

Chervonodniprovka Червонодніпровка
- Village
- Location of Chervonodniprovka in Zaporizhzhia Oblast
- Coordinates: 47°34′08″N 34°58′03″E
- Country: Ukraine
- Oblast: Zaporizhzhia Oblast
- Raion: Zaporizhzhia Raion
- Hromada: Bilenke rural hromada
- Founded: 1922

Area
  - Total: 13.192 km^{2} (5.093 sq mi)
- Elevation: 48 m (157 ft)

Population (2001)
  - Total: 64
  - Density: 4.9/km^{2} (13/sq mi)
- Time zone: UTC+2 (EET)
  - Summer (DST): UTC+3 (EEST)
- Postal code: 70441
- Area code: +380 612
- Climate: Dfa
- Website: http://rada.gov.ua/

Chervonodniprovka (Ukrainian: Червонодніпровка; Russian: Червоноднепровка) is a village (a selo) in the Zaporizhzhia Raion (district) of Zaporizhzhia Oblast in southern Ukraine. Its population was 64 in the 2001 Ukrainian Census. Administratively, it belonged to the Bilenke Rural Council, a former local government area, before the administrative reform in 2020.

The settlement was first founded in 1922 as Chervona Zabora (Ukrainian: Червона Забора); in 1955 it was renamed to Chervonodniprovka.
