= Ivanhorod, Zaporizhzhia Raion =

Ivanhorod Івангород
- Village
- Location of Ivanhorod in Zaporizhzhia Oblast
- Coordinates: 48°02′22″N 34°59′08″E
- Country: Ukraine
- Oblast: Zaporizhzhia Oblast
- District: Zaporizhzhia Raion
- Council: Avhustynivka Rural Council
- Founded: 1930

Area
  - Total: 3 km^{2} (1.2 sq mi)
- Elevation: 119 m (390 ft)

Population (2001)
  - Total: 32
  - Density: 11/km^{2} (28/sq mi)
- Time zone: UTC+2 (EET)
  - Summer (DST): UTC+3 (EEST)
- Postal code: 70403
- Area code: +380 61
- Website: http://rada.gov.ua/

Ivanhorod (Ukrainian: Івангород) is a village (a selo) in the Zaporizhzhia Raion (district) of Zaporizhzhia Oblast in southern Ukraine. Its population was 32 in the 2001 Ukrainian Census. Administratively, it belongs to the Avhustynivka Rural Council, a local government area.
