= Bilenke Rural Council, Zaporizhzhia Oblast =

Bilenke Rural Council Біленьківська сільська рада
- Rural council
- Location of the council's administrative center Bilenke in Zaporizhzhia Oblast
- Coordinates: 47°37′26″N 35°02′46″E
- Country: Ukraine
- Oblast: Zaporizhzhia Oblast
- Raion: Zaporizhzhia Raion
- Established: 29 December 1994
- Admin. center: Bilenke
- Composition: List: Bilenke (village); Chervonodniprovka (village)

Area
  - Total: 98 km^{2} (38 sq mi)
- Elevation: 17 m (56 ft)

Population (2001)
  - Total: 5,040
  - Density: 51/km^{2} (130/sq mi)
- Time zone: UTC+2 (EET)
  - Summer (DST): UTC+3 (EEST)
- Postal code: 70441
- Area code: +380 612
- KOATUU: 2322180800
- Website: http://rada.gov.ua/

The Bilenke Rural Council (Ukrainian: Біленьківська сільська рада, romanized: Bilen'kivs'ka sil's'ka rada; officially, Bilenke Village Council) was one of 16 rural local government areas of the Zaporizhzhia Raion (district) of Zaporizhzhia Oblast in southern Ukraine. Its population was 5,040 in the 2001 Ukrainian Census.

It was established by the Verkhovna Rada, Ukraine's parliament, on 29 December 1994. The council's administrative center was located in the village of Bilenke. Village councils as separate administrative divisions were abolished in 2020 and replaced with hromadas.

== Government ==
The council's local government council consists of 20 locally-elected deputies. The council is represented by the No.82 single-mandate constituency for parliamentary elections in Ukraine.

== Populated settlements ==
The Bilenke Rural Council's jurisdiction includes two villages (Ukrainian: село, selo):

- Bilenke (pop. 4,976)
- Chervonodniprovka (pop. 64)
