= Avhustynivka Rural Council =

Avhustynivka Rural Council Августинівська сільська рада
- Rural council
- Location of the council's administrative center Avhustynivka in Zaporizhzhia Oblast
- Coordinates: 48°02′15″N 35°02′00″E
- Country: Ukraine
- Oblast: Zaporizhzhia Oblast
- Raion: Zaporizhzhia Raion
- Established: 7 December 1990
- Admin. center: Avhustynivka
- Composition: List: Avhustynivka (village); Ivanhorod (village); Lemeshynske (village); Novoselysche (village); Pryvitne (village); Svitanok (village); Vidradne (rural settlement)

Area
  - Total: 78.67 km^{2} (30.37 sq mi)
- Elevation: 108 m (354 ft)

Population (2001)
  - Total: 3,008
  - Density: 38.24/km^{2} (99.03/sq mi)
- Time zone: UTC+2 (EET)
  - Summer (DST): UTC+3 (EEST)
- Postal code: 70403
- Area code: +380 61
- KOATUU: 2322180400
- Website: http://rada.gov.ua/

The Avhustynivka Rural Council (Ukrainian: Августинівська сільська рада, romanized: Avhustynivs'ka sil'ska rada; officially, Avhustynivka Village Council) was one of 16 rural local government areas of the Zaporizhzhia Raion (district) of Zaporizhzhia Oblast in southern Ukraine. Its population was 3,008 in the 2001 Ukrainian Census.

It was established by the Verkhovna Rada, Ukraine's parliament, on 7 December 1990. The council's administrative center was located in the village of Avhustynivka. Village councils as separate administrative divisions were abolished in 2020 and replaced with hromadas.

== Government ==
Its local government council consists of 20 locally-elected deputies. The council is represented by the No.82 single-mandate constituency for parliamentary elections in Ukraine.

== Populated settlements ==
The Avhustynivka Rural Council's jurisdiction includes six villages (Ukrainian: село, selo):

- Avhustynivka (pop. 1,017)
- Ivanhorod (pop. 32)
- Lemeshynske (pop. 38)
- Novoselysche (pop. 88)
- Pryvitne (pop. 190)
- Svitanok (pop. 268)

In addition, the rural settlement (Ukrainian: селище, selysche) of Vidradne (pop. 1,375) falls under the council's jurisdiction.
