= Privilegium of 1873 (Canada) =

Letter inviting Mennonites to settle in Canada

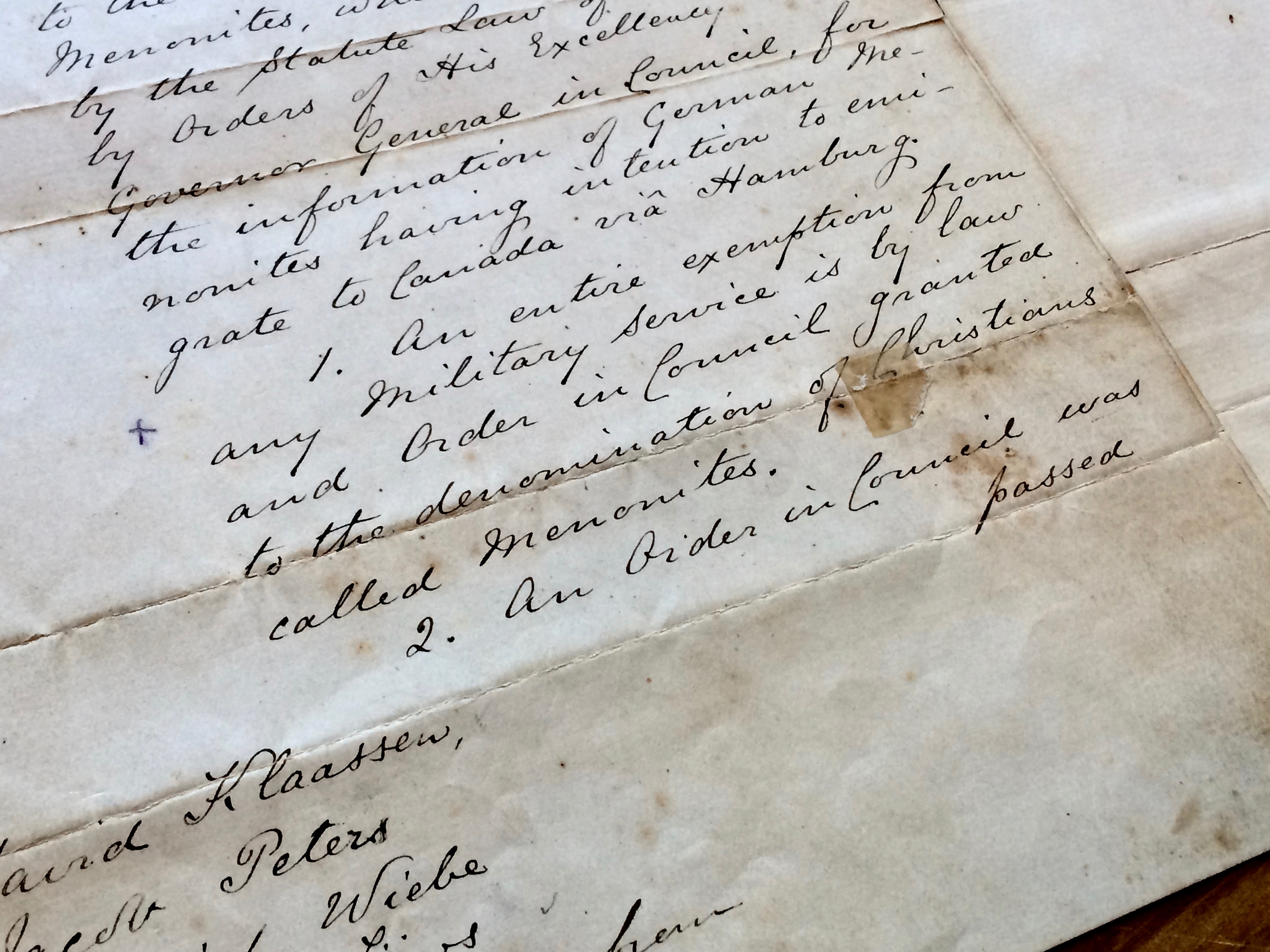
Original copy of Mennonite Privilegium from the Mennonite Heritage Archives in Winnipeg

The Privilegium of 1873 (sometimes called "The Lowe Letter") is the original invitation letter from the Government of Canada to Mennonites living in the Russian Empire offering them land, military exemption, and private schools, among other privileges.

The original document was rediscovered in 2015 in the Chortitzer Church basement in Steinbach.

== Background ==
Because of their pacifist beliefs, Mennonites were known to migrate to other countries in order to maintain their lifestyles. When migrating, they signed agreements with their host countries. These agreements were known as Privilegium or "Privileges." A similar Privilegium had been signed with Catherine the Great of Russia when Mennonites first immigrated from Prussia to the Russian Empire in the 1770s.

== History ==
In 1873, twelve Mennonite delegates from southern Russia set out to North America to investigate new lands. Of the 12 delegates, four decided to accept Canada's offer of land in the newly formed province of Manitoba. Representatives of the Bergthaler and Kleine Gemeinde churches, David Klassen, Jacob Peters, Heinrich Wiebe, and Cornelius Toews, signed the agreement with John Lowe, Secretary of the Canadian Department of Agriculture, and beginning in 1874 and the years that followed, 21,000 Mennonites immigrated to this part of Canada, including the East Reserve, as established in the original agreement, and later the West Reserve and other areas.

The Privilegium was referred to by Canadian Mennonites to defend their right to be Conscientious Objectors during both World War I and World War II. During the 1920s, many conservative Mennonites left Canada for Mexico and Paraguay after the Canadian government broke the promise of private school as agreed in the Privilegium.

The original document was rediscovered in 2015 in the Chortitzer Church basement in Steinbach. The document is now housed at the Mennonite Heritage Archives at the Canadian Mennonite University in Winnipeg.

== See also ==
- East Reserve
- West Reserve
- Mennonites
