= Vidradne, Zaporizhzhia Raion =

Vidradne Відрадне
- Rural settlement
- Location of Vidradne in Zaporizhzhia Oblast
- Coordinates: 47°59′30″N 35°03′48″E
- Country: Ukraine
- Oblast: Zaporizhzhia Oblast
- District: Zaporizhzhia Raion
- Council: Avhustynivka Rural Council
- Founded: 1930

Area
  - Total: 19.689 km^{2} (7.602 sq mi)
- Elevation: 91 m (299 ft)

Population (2001)
  - Total: 1,375
  - Density: 69.84/km^{2} (180.9/sq mi)
- Time zone: UTC+2 (EET)
  - Summer (DST): UTC+3 (EEST)
- Postal code: 70406
- Area code: +380 61
- Website: http://rada.gov.ua/

Vidradne (Ukrainian: Відрадне) is a rural settlement in the Zaporizhzhia Raion (district) of Zaporizhzhia Oblast in southern Ukraine. As of 2024, its population was more than 2,000 people. Administratively, it belongs to the Avhustynivka Rural Council, a local government area.
