= Dniprelstan =

Dniprelstan Дніпрельстан
- Village
- Location of Dniprelstan in Zaporizhzhia Oblast
- Coordinates: 47°55′49″N 35°01′27″E
- Country: Ukraine
- Oblast: Zaporizhzhia Oblast
- Raion: Zaporizhzhia Raion
- Hromada: Shyroke rural hromada
- Founded: 1929

Area
  - Total: 6.454 km^{2} (2.492 sq mi)
- Elevation: 109 m (358 ft)

Population (2001)
  - Total: 417
  - Density: 64.6/km^{2} (167/sq mi)
- Time zone: UTC+2 (EET)
  - Summer (DST): UTC+3 (EEST)
- Postal code: 70412
- Area code: +380 612
- Climate: Dfa
- Website: http://rada.gov.ua/

Dniprelstan (Ukrainian: Дніпрельстан; Russian: Днепрельстан) is a village (a selo) in the Zaporizhzhia Raion (district) of Zaporizhzhia Oblast in southern Ukraine. Its population was 417 according to the 2001 Ukrainian Census. Administratively, it belonged to the Volodymyrivske Rural Council, a former local government area before the administrative reform in 2020.

The settlement was founded in 1929 as Dniprostroivka (Ukrainian: Дніпростроївка; Russian: Днепростроевка); in 1965 it was renamed to Dniprelstan.
