= Cherepivske =

Cherepivske Черепівське
- Village
- Location of Cherepivske in Zaporizhzhia Oblast
- Coordinates: 47°50′53″N 35°24′39″E
- Country: Ukraine
- Oblast: Zaporizhzhia Oblast
- District: Zaporizhzhia Raion
- Founded: 1878

Area
  - Total: 1.2 km^{2} (0.46 sq mi)
- Elevation: 74 m (243 ft)

Population (2001)
  - Total: 31
  - Density: 26/km^{2} (67/sq mi)
- Time zone: UTC+2 (EET)
  - Summer (DST): UTC+3 (EEST)
- Postal code: 70430
- Area code: +380 612
- Website: http://rada.gov.ua/

Cherepivske (Ukrainian: Черепівське; Russian: Череповское) is a village (a selo) in the Zaporizhzhia Raion (district) of Zaporizhzhia Oblast in southern Ukraine. Its population was 31 in the 2001 Ukrainian Census. Administratively, it belongs to the Natalivka Rural Council, a local government area.
