= Richne, Zaporizhzhia Raion =

Richne Річне
- Rural settlement
- Location of Richne in Zaporizhzhia Oblast
- Coordinates: 47°40′34″N 35°19′10″E
- Country: Ukraine
- Oblast: Zaporizhzhia Oblast
- District: Zaporizhzhia Raion
- Founded: 1956

Area
  - Total: 0.66 km^{2} (0.25 sq mi)
- Elevation: 24 m (79 ft)

Population (2001)
  - Total: 109
  - Density: 170/km^{2} (430/sq mi)
- Time zone: UTC+2 (EET)
  - Summer (DST): UTC+3 (EEST)
- Postal code: 70452
- Area code: +380 612
- Website: http://rada.gov.ua/

Richne (Ukrainian: Річне) is a rural settlement in the Zaporizhzhia Raion (district) of Zaporizhzhia Oblast in southern Ukraine. Its population was 109 in the 2001 Ukrainian Census. Administratively, it belongs to the Hryhorivka Rural Council, a local government area.
