= Dolynske Rural Council =

Dolynske Rural Council Долинська сільська рада
- Rural council
- Location of the council's administrative center Dolynske in Zaporizhzhia Oblast
- Coordinates: 47°47′16″N 34°56′35″E
- Country: Ukraine
- Oblast: Zaporizhzhia Oblast
- Raion: Zaporizhzhia Raion
- Established: 23 March 1995
- Admin. center: Dolynske
- Composition: List: Baburka (village); Dolynske (village); Kantserivka (rural settlement); Khortytsia (village); Nove Zaporizhia (village); Novoslobidka (village); Vysokohirne (rural settlement)

Area
  - Total: 95.933 km^{2} (37.040 sq mi)
- Elevation: 97 m (318 ft)

Population (2001)
  - Total: 2,815
  - Density: 29.34/km^{2} (76.00/sq mi)
- Time zone: UTC+2 (EET)
  - Summer (DST): UTC+3 (EEST)
- Postal code: 70420
- Area code: +380 612
- KOATUU: 2322183500
- Website: http://rada.gov.ua/

The Dolynske Rural Council (Ukrainian: Долинська сільська рада, romanized: Dolyns'ka sil's'ka rada; officially, Dolynske Village Council) was one of 16 rural local government areas of the Zaporizhzhia Raion (district) of Zaporizhzhia Oblast in southern Ukraine. Its population was 2,815 in the 2001 Ukrainian Census.

It was established by the Verkhovna Rada, Ukraine's parliament, on 23 March 1995. The council's administrative center was located in the village of Dolynske. Village councils as separate administrative divisions were abolished in 2020 and replaced with hromadas.

== Government ==
The council's local government council consists of 20 locally elected deputies. The council is represented by the No.82 single-mandate constituency for parliamentary elections in Ukraine.

== Populated settlements ==
The Dolynske Rural Council's jurisdiction consists of five villages (Ukrainian: село, selo):

- Baburka (pop. 362)
- Dolynske (pop. 690)
- Khortytsia
- Nove Zaporizhzhia (pop. 771)
- Novoslobidka (pop. 548)

In addition, the two rural settlements (Ukrainian: селище, selysche) of Kantserivka (pop. 193) and Vysokohirne (pop. 251) fall under the councils jurisdiction.

The village of Khortytsia is the council's newest populated settlement, having been established by the Ukrainian parliament on 18 December 2008.
