= Lemeshynske =

Lemeshynske Лемешинське
- Village
- Location of Lemeshynske in Zaporizhzhia Oblast
- Coordinates: 48°00′52″N 35°01′47″E
- Country: Ukraine
- Oblast: Zaporizhzhia Oblast
- District: Zaporizhzhia Raion
- Council: Avhustynivka Rural Council
- Founded: 1932

Area
  - Total: 2.51 km^{2} (0.97 sq mi)
- Elevation: 113 m (371 ft)

Population (2001)
  - Total: 38
  - Density: 15/km^{2} (39/sq mi)
- Time zone: UTC+2 (EET)
  - Summer (DST): UTC+3 (EEST)
- Postal code: 70403
- Area code: +380 61
- Website: http://rada.gov.ua/

Lemeshynske (Ukrainian: Лемешинське) is a village (a selo) in the Zaporizhzhia Raion (district) of Zaporizhzhia Oblast in southern Ukraine. Its population was 38 in the 2001 Ukrainian Census. Administratively, it belongs to the Avhustynivka Rural Council, a local government area.
