= Zaporizhzhia (disambiguation) =

Zaporizhzhia or Zaporizhia is a city in Ukraine.

Zaporizhzhia, Zaporozhzhia, or Zaporozhye may also refer to:

== Places in Ukraine ==
- Zaporizhzhia (region), a historical region in central east Ukraine below the Dnieper river rapids
- Zaporizhzhia Governorate, (1920–22) Ukrainian SSR, Soviet Union
- Zaporizhzhia Oblast (1939–), a first-level administrative unit in Ukraine
  - Zaporizhzhia Raion, an administrative unit of Zaporizhzhia Oblast
  - Nove Zaporizhzhia, Zaporizhzhia Raion, a village in Zaporizhzhia Raion
  - Zaporizhzhia Oblast, Russia; Oblast/occupied territory disputed with Ukraine

=== Facilities and structures ===
- Zaporizhzhia International Airport, Zaporizhzhia
- Zaporizhzhia Nuclear Power Plant, Enerhodar
- Zaporizhzhia thermal power station, Enerhodar

== Other uses ==
- Ukrainian submarine Zaporizhzhia

== See also ==
- Zaporozhsky (disambiguation)
- ZAZ Zaporozhets, a series of cars
