= Avhustynivka =

Avhustynivka Августинівка
- Village
- Location of Avhustynivka in Zaporizhzhia Oblast
- Coordinates: 48°02′15″N 35°02′00″E
- Country: Ukraine
- Oblast: Zaporizhzhia Oblast
- Raion: Zaporizhzhia Raion
- Hromada: Shyroke rural hromada
- Founded: 1921
- Elevation: 108 m (354 ft)

Population (2001)
  - Total: 1,017
- Time zone: UTC+2 (EET)
  - Summer (DST): UTC+3 (EEST)
- Postal code: 70403
- Area code: +380 61xx
- Climate: Dfa
- Website: http://rada.gov.ua/

Avhustynivka (Ukrainian: Августинівка; Russian: Августиновка) is a village (a selo) in the Zaporizhzhia Raion (district) of Zaporizhzhia Oblast in southern Ukraine. Its population was 1,017 in the 2001 Ukrainian Census. Avhustynivka was the administrative center of the Avhustynivka Rural Council, a local government area until its abolishment during an administrative reform in 2020.

The village was formed in 1921 as the village of Hnativka (Ukrainian: Гнатівка); in 1929 it was renamed to Avhustynivka, after 153 families were resettled to the village after the fooding of the village of Avhustynivka following the creation of the Dnieper Hydroelectric Station. The original village of Avhustynivka was founded in 1780.
