= Pryvitne, Zaporizhzhia Raion =

Pryvitne Привітне
- Village
- Location of Pryvitne in Zaporizhzhia Oblast
- Coordinates: 48°00′00″N 35°06′36″E
- Country: Ukraine
- Oblast: Zaporizhzhia Oblast
- District: Zaporizhzhia Raion
- Council: Avhustynivka Rural Council
- Founded: 1928

Area
  - Total: 7.63 km^{2} (2.95 sq mi)
- Elevation: 59 m (194 ft)

Population (2001)
  - Total: 190
  - Density: 25/km^{2} (64/sq mi)
- Time zone: UTC+2 (EET)
  - Summer (DST): UTC+3 (EEST)
- Postal code: 70406
- Area code: +380 61
- Website: http://rada.gov.ua/

Pryvitne (Ukrainian: Привітне) is a village (a selo) in the Zaporizhzhia Raion (district) of Zaporizhzhia Oblast in southern Ukraine. Its population was 190 in the 2001 Ukrainian Census. Administratively, it belongs to the Avhustynivka Rural Council, a local government area.

The settlement was first founded in 1928 as Nova Oleksandrivka (Ukrainian: Нова Олександрівка); in 1967, it was renamed to Pryvitne.

On September 19, 2022, the Russian military launched a rocket attack on the village and 12 homes were damaged.
