= Zaporozhets, Zaporizhzhia Raion =

Zaporozhets Запорожець
- Village
- Location of Zaporozhets in Zaporizhzhia Oblast
- Coordinates: 47°41′41″N 35°26′46″E
- Country: Ukraine
- Oblast: Zaporizhzhia Oblast
- District: Zaporizhzhia Raion
- Village status: 1965

Area
  - Total: 7.09 km^{2} (2.74 sq mi)
- Elevation: 24 m (79 ft)

Population (2001)
  - Total: 182
  - Density: 25.7/km^{2} (66.5/sq mi)
- Time zone: UTC+2 (EET)
  - Summer (DST): UTC+3 (EEST)
- Postal code: 70434
- Area code: +380 612
- Website: http://rada.gov.ua/

Zaporozhets (Ukrainian: Запорожець) is a village (a selo) in the Zaporizhzhia Raion (district) of Zaporizhzhia Oblast in southern Ukraine. Its population was 182 in the 2001 Ukrainian Census. Administratively, it belongs to the Hryhorivka Rural Council, a local government area.

The settlement was founded in 1922 as a khutir (a type of rural locality); in 1965, Zaporozhets was granted the status of a village.
