= Novoselyshche =

Novoselyshche (Ukrainian: Новоселище) is an inhabited locality in Ukraine and it may refer to:

- Novoselyshche, Lviv Oblast, a village in Zolochiv Raion, Lviv Oblast
- Novoselyshche, Zaporizhzhia Oblast, a village in Zaporizhzhia Raion, Zaporizhzhia Oblast
