= Chervonyi Yar =

Chervonyi Yar may refer to the following villages in Ukraine:

- Chervonyi Yar, Izmail Raion, Odesa Oblast
- Chervonyi Yar, Zaporizhzhia Raion
