= Novoslobidka =

Novoslobidka Новослобідка
- Village
- Location of Novoslobidka in Zaporizhzhia Oblast Novoslobidka (Zaporizhzhia Oblast)
- Coordinates: 47°48′42″N 35°00′25″E
- Country: Ukraine
- Oblast: Zaporizhzhia Oblast
- District: Zaporizhzhia Raion
- Council: Dolynske Rural Council
- Founded: 1859

Area
  - Total: 19.26 km^{2} (7.44 sq mi)
- Elevation: 57 m (187 ft)

Population (2001)
  - Total: 548
  - Density: 28.5/km^{2} (73.7/sq mi)
- Time zone: UTC+2 (EET)
  - Summer (DST): UTC+3 (EEST)
- Postal code: 70423
- Area code: +380 612
- Website: http://rada.gov.ua/

Novoslobidka (Ukrainian: Новослобідка; literally, New Sloboda) is a village (a selo) in the Zaporizhzhia Raion (district) of Zaporizhzhia Oblast in southern Ukraine. Its population was 548 in the 2001 Ukrainian Census.

The settlement was first founded in 1859 as Rosengarten (Ukrainian: Розенгартен) by German-speaking Mennonites settling the Chortitza Colony; it was renamed to Novoslobidka in 1920. Administratively, it belongs to the Dolynske Rural Council, a local government area. It is located west of the Khortytskyi District of the city of Zaporizhzhia, the oblast's administrative center.

== See also ==
- History of German settlement in Central and Eastern Europe
