= Nove Zaporizhzhia, Zaporizhzhia Raion, Zaporizhzhia Oblast =

Nove Zaporizhzhia Нове Запоріжжя
- Village
- Location of Nove Zaporizhzhia in Zaporizhzhia Oblast
- Coordinates: 47°49′44″N 34°55′53″E
- Country: Ukraine
- Oblast: Zaporizhzhia Oblast
- District: Zaporizhzhia Raion
- Council: Dolynske Rural Council

Area
  - Total: 21.833 km^{2} (8.430 sq mi)
- Elevation: 112 m (367 ft)

Population (2001)
  - Total: 771
  - Density: 35.3/km^{2} (91.5/sq mi)
- Time zone: UTC+2 (EET)
  - Summer (DST): UTC+3 (EEST)
- Postal code: 70422
- Area code: +380 612
- Website: http://rada.gov.ua/

Nove Zaporizhzhia (Ukrainian: Нове Запоріжжя; literally, New Zaporizhzhia) is a village (a selo) in the Zaporizhzhia Raion (district) of Zaporizhzhia Oblast in southern Ukraine. Its population was 771 in the 2001 Ukrainian Census.

Administratively, it belongs to the Dolynske Rural Council, a local government area. It is located west of the Khortytskyi District of the city of Zaporizhzhia, the oblast's administrative center.
