= Chervonyi Yar, Zaporizhzhia Raion =

Chervonyi Yar Червоний Яр
- Village
- Location of Chervonyi Yar in Zaporizhzhia Oblast
- Coordinates: 48°02′04″N 34°57′20″E
- Country: Ukraine
- Oblast: Zaporizhzhia Oblast
- Raion: Zaporizhzhia Raion
- Hromada: Shyroke rural hromada
- Founded: 1928

Area
  - Total: 7.4 km^{2} (2.9 sq mi)
- Elevation: 115 m (377 ft)

Population (2001)
  - Total: 114
  - Density: 15/km^{2} (40/sq mi)
- Time zone: UTC+2 (EET)
  - Summer (DST): UTC+3 (EEST)
- Postal code: 70405
- Area code: +380 612
- Climate: Dfa
- Website: http://rada.gov.ua/

Chervonyi Yar (Ukrainian: Червоний Яр; Russian: Червоный Яр) is a village (a selo) in the Zaporizhzhia Raion (district) of Zaporizhzhia Oblast in southern Ukraine. Its population was 114 in the 2001 Ukrainian Census. Administratively, it belonged to the Vesele Rural Council, a former local government area before the administrative reform in 2020.
