= Randolph, Manitoba =

Randolph
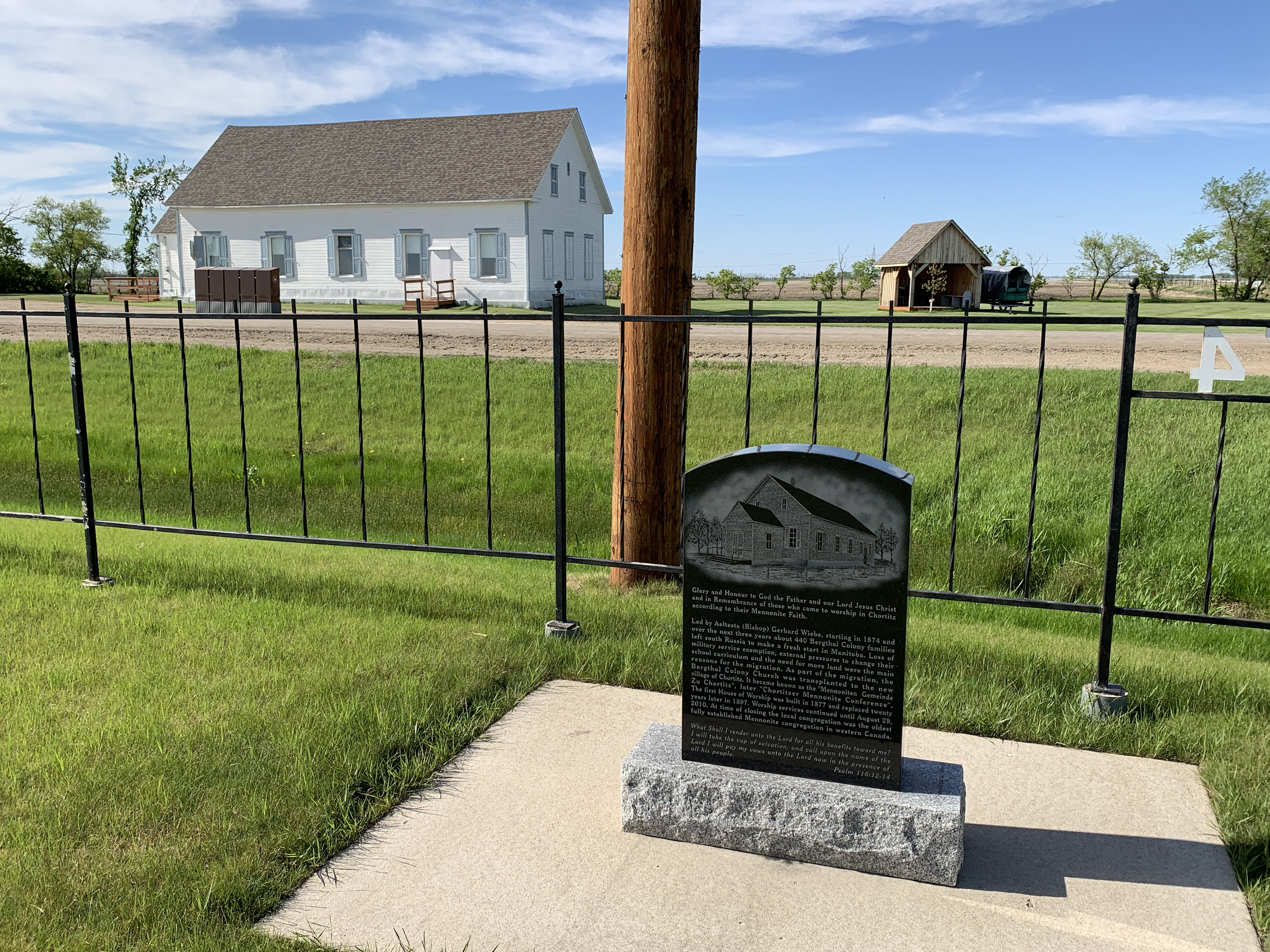
- Chortitz church and cemetery, 2021

- Location of Randolph Randolph (Canada)
- Coordinates: 49°32′49″N 096°49′44″W
- Country: Canada
- Province: Manitoba
- Rural municipality: Hanover
- Region: Eastman
- Census Division: No. 2

Government
  - R.M. Council (Ward 1): Local Councillor
  - MP: Ted Falk
  - MLA: Kelvin Goertzen, Konrad Narth
- Time zone: UTC−6 (CST)
  - Summer (DST): UTC−5 (CDT)
- Area code: 204
- NTS Map: 062H10
- GNBC Code: GAWOL

Randolph, originally known as Chortitz, is a small community in the Rural Municipality of Hanover, Manitoba, Canada. The community has an estimated population of 70 and is located 1.6 kilometres north of Highway 52 on Provincial Road 206 about 11 kilometres west of Steinbach. Randolph is located within a half kilometre of the longitudinal centre of Canada.

== History ==
The area that is now known as Randolph were originally lands of the nomadic Ojibway-speaking Anishinabe people. On 3 August 1871 the Anishinabe people signed Treaty 1 and moved onto reserves such as the Brokenhead Indian Reserve and Roseau River Anishinabe First Nation Reserve. The community of Chortitz was founded in the 1874 by Mennonite immigrants who came from Russia to settle the lands known as the East Reserve, now largely the Rural Municipality of Hanover. The village agreement was signed in 1877 by fifteen Mennonite families; eight Bergthaler and seven Chortitzer. As home of the Bergthaler Bishop Gerhard Wiebe, the village quickly became the centre for trade and local government and an unofficial "capital" of the East Reserve, though over time the Kleine Gemeinde village of Steinbach overtook Chortitz in prominence. East Reserve Bergthalers adopted the named Chortitzer Mennonite Conference in 1878. By 1883, only six of the original families remained while new residents moved in. All the houses and residential yards were on the north side of the original street, which ran differently from the present Randolph Road, due to a resurvey when the municipality established the road.

The community received the name Randolph when the Manitoba government established a local school district in the early 1900s. The Canadian government deliberately chose English names, such as Randolph, Mitchell, New Bothwell, and others in an attempt to assimilate the Mennonites into Canadian culture. Canada Post later established the postal district of Randolph. The local post office operated out of a local business until 2008.

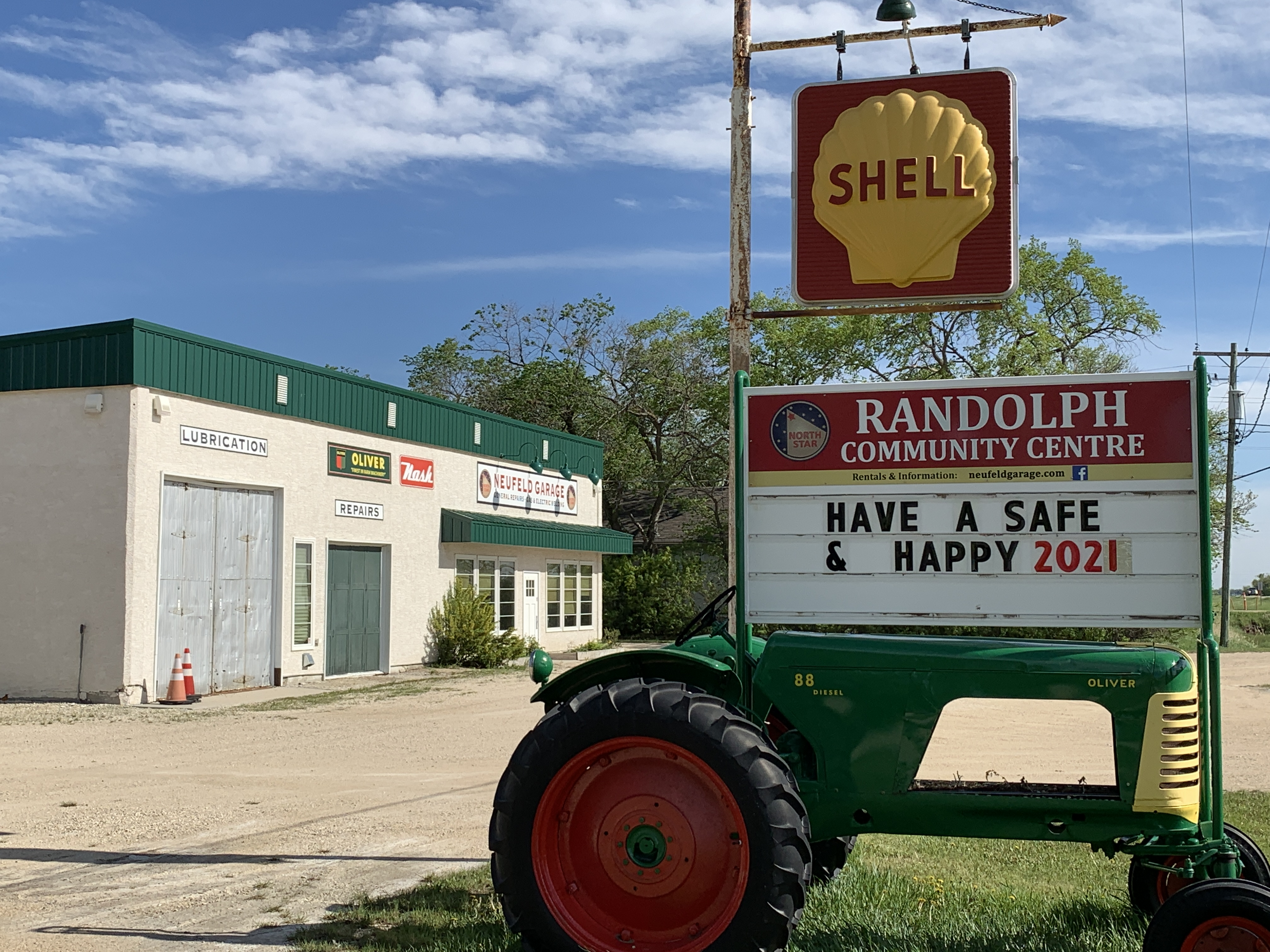
Historic Neufeld Garage, now Randolph Community Centre

The most noteworthy structure at Randolph is the Chortitz Heritage Church, which was established as a congregation in 1876, with the current building dating to 1897. It was likely the first Mennonite church in western Canada and granted heritage status by the municipality in 2014. The Randolph Heritage Cemetery is located across the road from the church.

The Randolph Rink, located south of the community, was a popular outdoor hockey rink built in the 1960s. The rink was featured on the CBC Television series On the Road Again. It was used until 2006 and demolished in 2009.

A group of local residents later transformed the community's historic 1948 auto repair shop Neufeld Garage into the Randolph Community Centre, which has also been used as a filming location for film and television, due to its authentic mid-century decor. The non-profit Randolph Sports Club opened in 2015.

== See also ==
- Chortitz Heritage Church
