= Kushuhum =

Rural locality in Zaporizhzhia Oblast, Ukraine

Kushuhum Кушугум
- Rural settlement
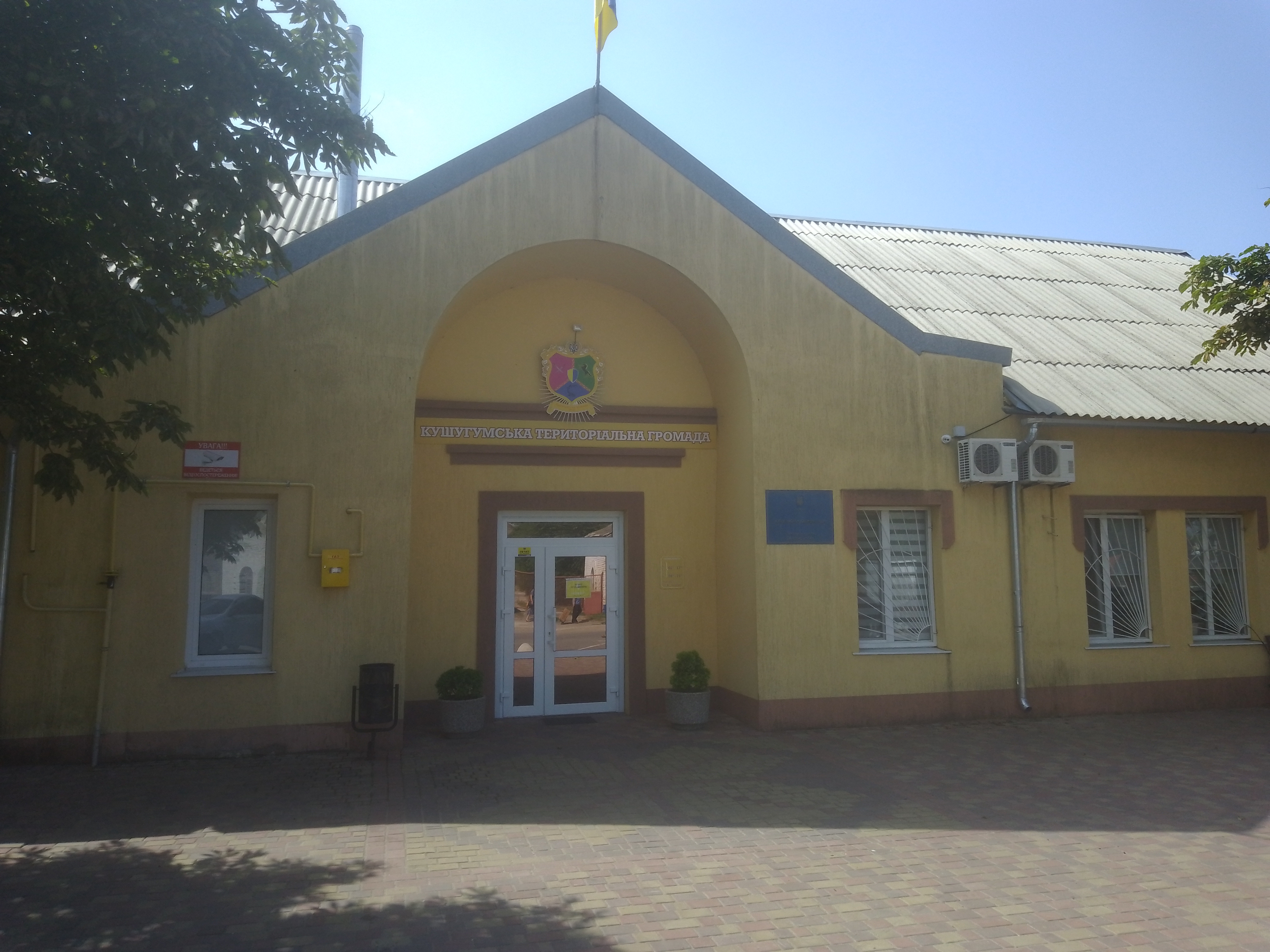

- Location of Kushuhum in Zaporizhzhia Oblast Kushuhum (Zaporizhzhia Oblast)
- Coordinates: 47°42′38″N 35°13′09″E
- Country: Ukraine
- Oblast: Zaporizhzhia Oblast
- Raion: Zaporizhzhia Raion
- Hromada: Kushuhum settlement hromada
- Founded: 1770
- Settlement status: 1938

Area
  - Total: 4.499 km^{2} (1.737 sq mi)
- Elevation: 60 m (200 ft)

Population (2022)
  - Total: 7,796 ▼
  - Density: 1,733/km^{2} (4,488/sq mi)
- Time zone: UTC+2 (EET)
  - Summer (DST): UTC+3 (EEST)
- Postal code: 70450–451
- Area code: +380 61
- Climate: Dfa
- Website: http://rada.gov.ua/

Kushuhum or Kushugum (Ukrainian: Кушугум) is a rural settlement in Zaporizhzhia Raion, Zaporizhzhia Oblast, southern Ukraine. Kushuhum hosts the administration of Kushuhum settlement hromada, one of the hromadas of Ukraine. In 2001, its population was 5,668 according to the census, Kushuhum is the administrative center of the Kushuhum settlement council, a local government area.

== History ==
The settlement was first founded in 1770 as the village of Velyka Katerynivka (Ukrainian: Велика Катеринівка). In 1938, it was renamed to Kushuhum and given the status of an urban-type settlement. It is located on the left bank of the Kakhovka Reservoir.

Until 26 January 2024, Kushuhum was designated urban-type settlement. On this day, a new law entered into force which abolished this status, and Kushuhum became a rural settlement.

== Demographics ==
According to the 2001 census, the population of Kushuhum is 7,764 people. According to the 2022 estimate, the population is 7,796 people.

=== Language ===
Distribution of the population by native language according to the 2001 census:

Language	Percentage
Ukrainian	84.5%
Russian	15.2%
other	0.3%
