= Shyroke rural hromada, Zaporizhzhia Oblast =

Shyroke rural hromada Широківська сільська громада
- Hromada
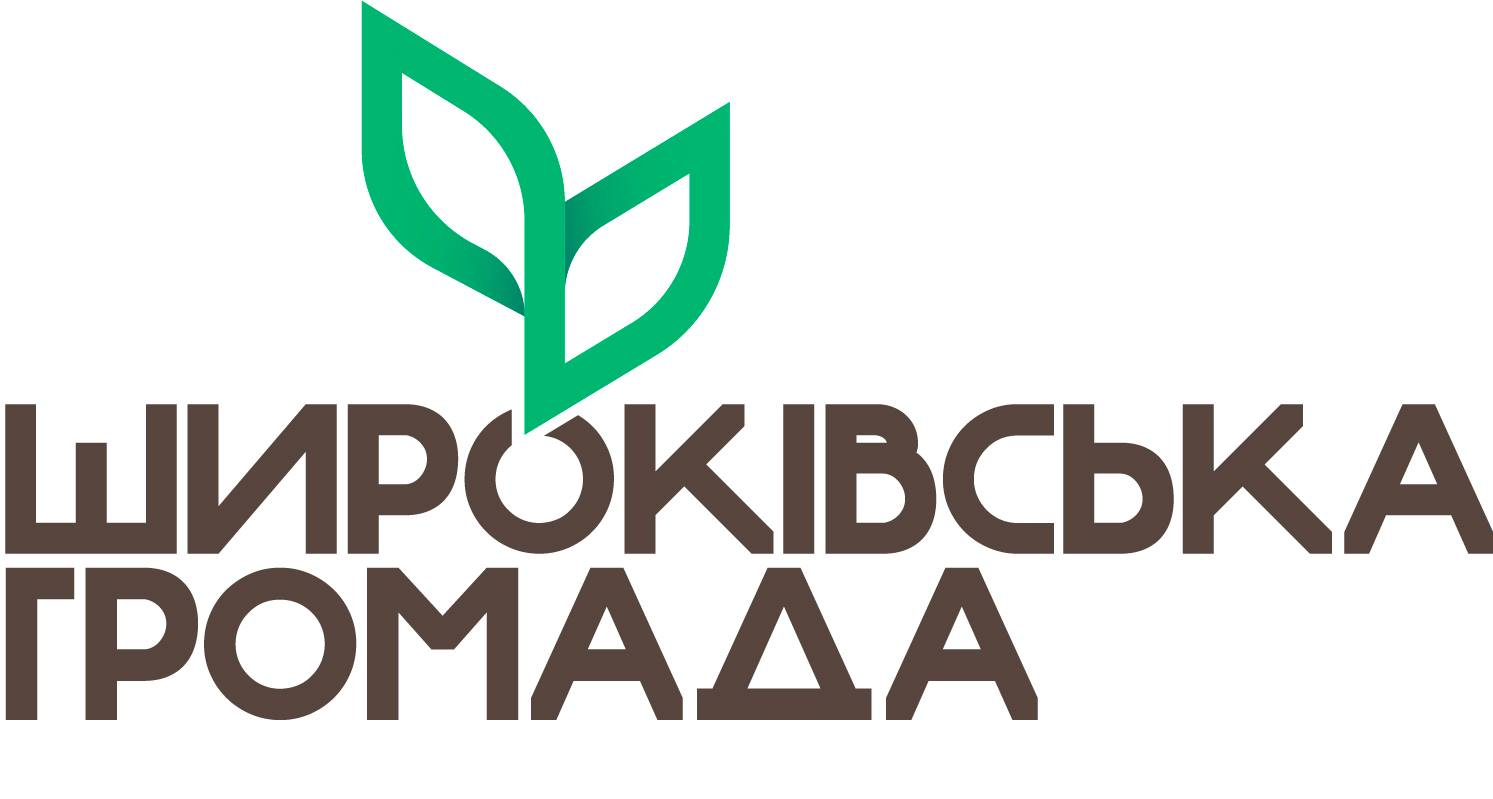
- Logo of the Shyroke rural hromady
- Interactive map of Shyroke rural hromada
- Country: Ukraine
- Oblast: Zaporizhzhia Oblast
- Raion: Zaporizhzhia Raion

Area
  - Total: 477.4 km^{2} (184.3 sq mi)

Population (2020)
  - Total: 13,149
  - Density: 27.54/km^{2} (71.34/sq mi)
- Settlements: 35
- Rural settlements: 2
- Villages: 33

Shyroke rural hromada (Ukrainian: Широківська сільська громада) is a hromada of Ukraine, located in Zaporizhzhia Raion, Zaporizhzhia Oblast. Its administrative center is the village of Shyroke.

It has an area of 477.4 square kilometres (184.3 mi^{2}) and a population of 13,149, as of 2020.

The hromada contains 35 settlements, including 33 villages:

- Avhustynivka
- Vesele
- Vodiane
- Volodymyrivske
- Hurskoho
- Dniprelstan
- Dniprovi Khvyli
- Dolynivka
- Zelenopillia
- Zoriane
- Ivanhorod
- Krylivske
- Lemeshynske
- Lukasheve
- Malyshivka
- Mykolai-Pole
- Morozivka
- Nadiia
- Novovoznesenka
- Novodniprovka
- Novopetrivka
- Novoselyshche
- Petropavlivka
- Petropil
- Pryvilne
- Pryvitne
- Prydniprovske
- Ruchaivka
- Svitanok
- Fedorivka
- Chervonyi Yar
- Shyroke
- Yavornytske

And 2 rural-type settlements: Soniachne and Vidradne.

== See also ==
- List of hromadas of Ukraine
