= Malokaterynivka =

Rural locality in Zaporizhzhia Oblast, Ukraine

Malokaterynivka Малокатеринівка
- Rural settlement
- Location in Zaporizhzhia Oblast Location in Ukraine
- Country: Ukraine
- Oblast: Zaporizhzhia Oblast
- Raion: Zaporizhzhia Raion

Population (2022)
  - Total: 3,292
- Time zone: UTC+2 (EET)
  - Summer (DST): UTC+3 (EEST)

Malokaterynivka (Ukrainian: Малокатеринівка; Russian: Малокатериновка) is a rural settlement in Zaporizhzhia Raion, Zaporizhzhia Oblast, southern Ukraine. It is located on the right bank of the Dnieper, dammed here as Kakhovka Reservoir, at the mouth of the Kinska. Malokaterynivka belongs to Kushuhum settlement hromada, one of the hromadas of Ukraine. Population: 3,292 (2022 estimate).

== History ==
The village previously had a beach on Kakhovka Reservoir, and took its water supply from the reservoir as well. The village has thus been greatly affected by the destruction of the Kakhovka Dam, as it lost its water supply and now requires water deliveries by truck, even as the dam's destruction has enabled the ecosystem to rebound to what it was before the dam was built.

Until 26 January 2024, Malokaterynivka was designated urban-type settlement. On this day, a new law entered into force which abolished this status, and Malokaterynivka became a rural settlement.

== Economy ==
=== Transportation ===
Kankrynivka railway station, located in Malokaterynivkа, is on the railway connecting Zaporizhzhia and Melitopol. There is some passenger traffic.

The settlement has access to highway M18 which connects Zaporizhzhia and Melitopol.
