= Settlement council =

Settlement council can refer to:

- Selsoviet, the lowest level of administrative division in rural areas in the Soviet Union
- Settlement council (Ukraine), a local government area for urban-type settlements in Ukraine
