= Vysokohirne, Zaporizhzhia Oblast =

Vysokohirne Високогірне
- Rural settlement
- Location of Vysokohirne in Zaporizhzhia Oblast
- Coordinates: 47°51′07″N 34°57′22″E
- Country: Ukraine
- Oblast: Zaporizhzhia Oblast
- District: Zaporizhzhia Raion
- Council: Dolynske Rural Council
- Founded: 1936

Area
  - Total: 4.969 km^{2} (1.919 sq mi)
- Elevation: 119 m (390 ft)

Population (2001)
  - Total: 251
  - Density: 50.5/km^{2} (131/sq mi)
- Time zone: UTC+2 (EET)
  - Summer (DST): UTC+3 (EEST)
- Postal code: 70421
- Area code: +380 612
- Website: http://rada.gov.ua/

Vysokohirne (Ukrainian: Високогірне) is a rural settlement in the Zaporizhzhia Raion (district) of Zaporizhzhia Oblast in southern Ukraine. Its population was 251 in the 2001 Ukrainian Census. Administratively, it belongs to the Dolynske Rural Council, a local government area.
