= Novoselyshche, Zaporizhzhia Oblast =

Novoselyshche Новоселище
- Village
- Location of Novoselyshche in Zaporizhzhia Oblast
- Coordinates: 48°01′39″N 35°01′07″E
- Country: Ukraine
- Oblast: Zaporizhzhia Oblast
- District: Zaporizhzhia Raion
- Council: Avhustynivka Rural Council
- Founded: 1929

Area
  - Total: 2.93 km^{2} (1.13 sq mi)
- Elevation: 118 m (387 ft)

Population (2001)
  - Total: 88
  - Density: 30/km^{2} (78/sq mi)
- Time zone: UTC+2 (EET)
  - Summer (DST): UTC+3 (EEST)
- Postal code: 70403
- Area code: +380 61
- Website: http://rada.gov.ua/

Novoselyshche (Ukrainian: Новоселище; translated as "New Settlement") is a village (a selo) in the Zaporizhzhia Raion (district) of Zaporizhzhia Oblast in southern Ukraine. Its population was 88 in the 2001 Ukrainian Census. Administratively, it belongs to the Avhustynivka Rural Council, a local government area.
