= Baburka =

Baburka Бабурка
- Village
- Location of Baburka in Zaporizhzhia Oblast Baburka (Ukraine)
- Coordinates: 47°47′48″N 35°03′40″E
- Country: Ukraine
- Oblast: Zaporizhzhia Oblast
- Raion: Zaporizhzhia Raion
- Council: Dolynske Rural Council
- Elevation: 36 m (118 ft)

Population (2001)
  - Total: 362
- Time zone: UTC+2 (EET)
  - Summer (DST): UTC+3 (EEST)
- Postal code: 70423
- Area code: +380 61xx
- Climate: Dfa
- Website: http://rada.gov.ua/

Baburka (Ukrainian: Бабурка) is a village (a selo) in the Zaporizhzhia Raion (district) of Zaporizhzhia Oblast in southern Ukraine. Its population was 362 in the 2001 Ukrainian Census.

== History ==
The settlement was first founded in 1785 as Burwalde by German-speaking Mennonites settling the Chortitza Colony. Administratively, it belongs to the Dolynske Rural Council, a local government area. It is located south of the Khortytskyi District of the city of Zaporizhzhia, the oblast's administrative center.

== See also ==
- History of German settlement in Central and Eastern Europe
