= City of district significance =

City of district significance (or importance) is a type of an administrative division in some countries of the former Soviet Union.

- in Russia; see town of district significance
- in Ukraine; see city of district significance (Ukraine)
