= Dolynske, Zaporizhzhia Raion, Zaporizhzhia Oblast =

Dolynske Долинське
- Village
- Location of Dolynske in Zaporizhzhia Oblast Dolynske (Zaporizhzhia Oblast)
- Coordinates: 47°47′16″N 34°56′35″E
- Country: Ukraine
- Oblast: Zaporizhzhia Oblast
- District: Zaporizhzhia Raion
- Council: Dolynske Rural Council
- Founded: 1809

Area
  - Total: 98.17 km^{2} (37.90 sq mi)
- Elevation: 97 m (318 ft)

Population (2001)
  - Total: 690
  - Density: 7.0/km^{2} (18/sq mi)
- Time zone: UTC+2 (EET)
  - Summer (DST): UTC+3 (EEST)
- Postal code: 70420
- Area code: +380 612
- Climate: Dfa
- Website: http://rada.gov.ua/

Dolynske (Ukrainian: Долинське; Russian: Долинское) is a village (a selo) in the Zaporizhzhia Raion (district) of Zaporizhzhia Oblast in southern Ukraine. Its population was 690 in the 2001 Ukrainian Census. Dolynske is the administrative center of the Dolynske Rural Council, a local government area.

The village was first founded in 1809 as Kronstal or Kronsthal (Ukrainian: Кронсталь) by German-speaking Mennonites settling the Chortitza Colony. In 1892, its name was changed to Pavlivka (Ukrainian: Павлівка, Russian: Павловка). Since 1963, the village is known as Dolynske.
