= Bilenke Pershe =

Bilenke Pershe Біленьке Перше
- Village
- Location of Bilenke Pershe in Zaporizhzhia Oblast Bilenke Pershe (Zaporizhzhia Oblast)
- Coordinates: 47°38′01″N 35°04′04″E
- Country: Ukraine
- Oblast: Zaporizhzhia Oblast
- District: Zaporizhzhia Raion

Area
  - Total: 1.046039 km^{2} (0.403878 sq mi)

Population (2001)
  - Total: 808
  - Density: 772/km^{2} (2,000/sq mi)
- Time zone: UTC+2 (EET)
  - Summer (DST): UTC+3 (EEST)
- Postal code: 70441
- Area code: +380 612
- Climate: Dfa
- Website: http://rada.gov.ua/

Bilenke Pershe (Ukrainian: Біленьке Перше, lit. 'First Bilenke'; Russian: Беленькое Первое) is a village (a selo) in the Zaporizhzhia Raion (district) of Zaporizhzhia Oblast in southern Ukraine. Its population was 808 in the 2001 Ukrainian Census. Administratively, it belongs to the Bilenke rural hromada.
