= Novoselyshche, Lviv Oblast =

Novoselyshche Новоселище
- Village
- Location of Novoselyshche in Lviv Oblast
- Coordinates: 49°47′44″N 25°04′31″E
- Country: Ukraine
- Oblast: Lviv Oblast
- District: Zolochiv Raion
- Hromada: Zolochiv urban hromada

Area
  - Total: 0.8 km^{2} (0.31 sq mi)
- Elevation: 382 m (1,253 ft)

Population (2001)
  - Total: 853
  - Estimate (2026): ▼844
  - Density: 1,100/km^{2} (2,800/sq mi)
- Time zone: UTC+2 (EET)
  - Summer (DST): UTC+3 (EEST)
- Postal code: 80745
- Area code: +380 3265

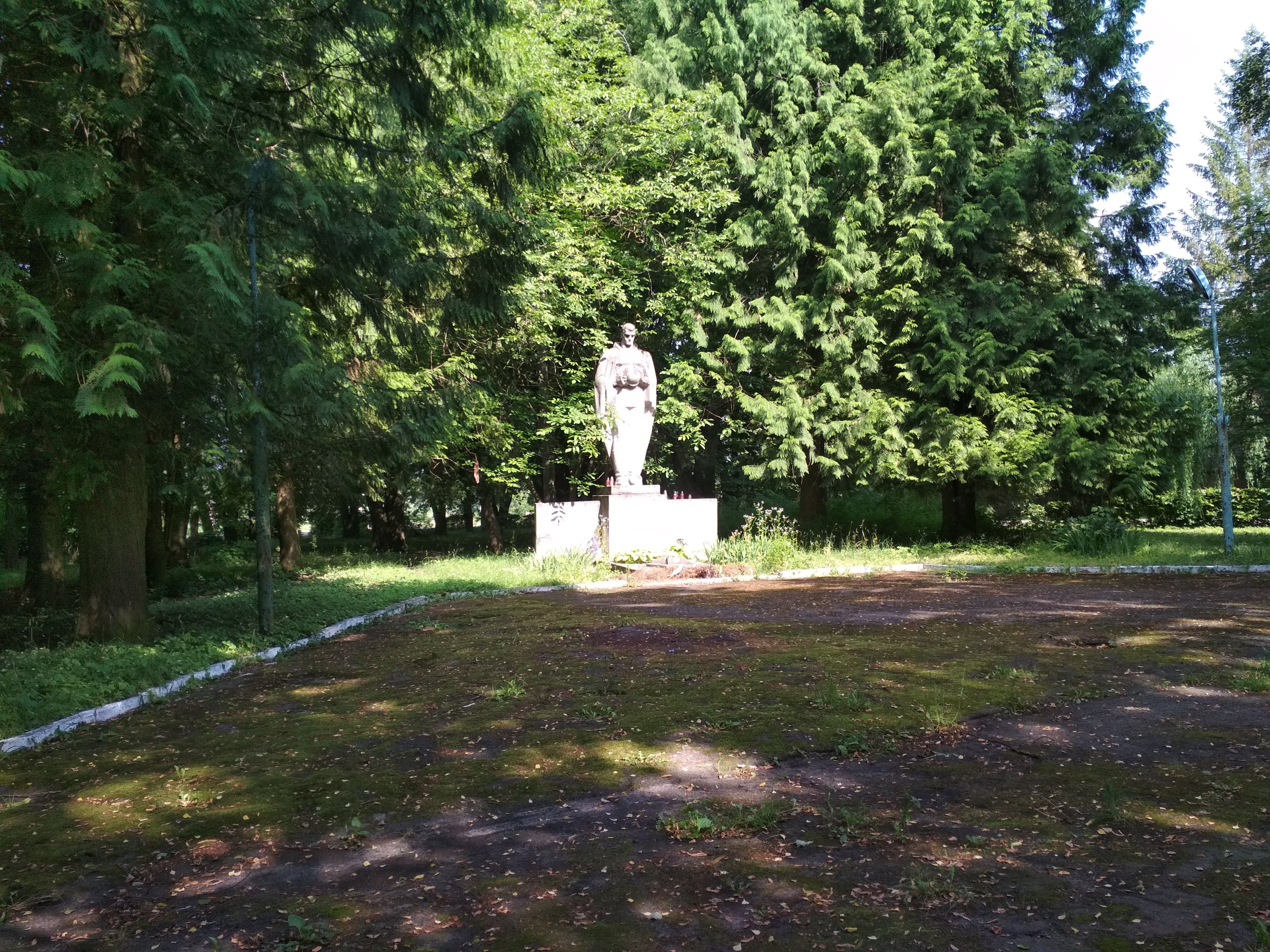
Mass grave of Soviet soldiers, Novoselishche, Glory Park

Novoselyshche (Ukrainian: Новоселище; translated as "New Settlement") is a village (a selo) in the Zolochiv Raion (district) of Lviv Oblast in western Ukraine. It forms part of Zolochiv urban hromada, one of the hromadas of Ukraine. Its population was 853 in the 2001 Ukrainian Census.

== History ==
In 1958, the Lviv Agricultural College was transferred to Novoselyshche, which received the name Zolochiv Agricultural College. In 1997, the Zolochiv Agricultural College became a branch of the Lviv National Agrarian University.
