= Zaporozhsky =

Zaporozhsky may refer to:

- Alexander Zaporozhsky, a former colonel in Russia’s SVR foreign intelligence agency
- Zaporozhskoye, a settlement in Karelia, Russia

== See also ==
- Zaporizhzhia (disambiguation)
- ZAZ Zaporozhets, a Ukrainian automobile series
