= City of district significance (Ukraine) =

Type of administrative entity in Ukraine

- Locations of cities of district significance in Ukraine
- Category: Third-level division of Ukraine
- Found in: Raions (districts)
- Created by: Verkhovna Rada law No.280/97-вр; Adopted on 4 May 1997
- Number: 276 (as of 2015)
- Additional status: City Council (Municipality)
- Populations: up to 50,000 (Note: According to the law "On the Approval of the National Program of the Development of Small Cities" dated 4 March 2005, small cities are defined as having populations of up to 50,000. The city of Boyarka, Kyiv Oblast in northern Ukraine has a population of 35,320 (2013 est.), which is the highest of all of the cities of district significance.)
- Areas: up to approx. 65 km^{2} (25 mi^{2}) (Note: The city of Kostopil, Rivne Oblast in western Ukraine has an area of 63.73 km^{2} (24.61 mi^{2}), which is the largest of all of the cities of district significance.)

A city of district significance (Ukrainian: місто районного значення, misto raionnoho znachennia) was a special category of city municipalities within each of the rural raions (districts) of Ukraine's first-level of administrative divisions. These cities were subordinate to the raion authorities and derive their powers from them. The KOATUU national classification system refers to them as the third-level of the country's administrative divisions. As of 2015, there were 276 cities of district significance in Ukraine.

Cities of district significance are automatically considered as "small cities", a status which is recognized by a few normative acts of the Verkhovna Rada. Ukrainian law designates these places with populations of up to 50,000. In 2008, the average population of a city of district significance was 13,400. Small cities can belong to one of several specific economic categories, often having a regional transportation significance, important local industry, or an important historical or tourist attraction.

As of 2015, 63 of the 276 cities of district significance were members of the Association of Small Cities of Ukraine, a public organization that was registered in 2011 to recognize the common issues of small cities in general and to further promote their development.

Cities of district and regional significance were abolished in 2020 as part of the administrative reform and became part of the new, larger raions.

== Characteristics ==
Under Ukrainian law, every city of district significance automatically belongs to the category of "small cities" (Ukrainian: малі міста, mali mista), which is defined by the law "On the Approval of the National Program of the Development of Small Cities" dated 4 March 2005 as cities which have populations of up to 50,000. These small cities have populations of up to 50,000, and they contain a certain amount of social and industrial infrastructure within their boundaries. They have a proportionally lower rate of industrial expansion compared to cities of regional significance, however, they allow for favorable conditions for the creation of social, cultural, household, communal areas to meet the needs of its urban residents and the surrounding district countryside.

A large number of these cities are centered on important industrial enterprises, creating the need of maintaining a favorable economic climate for industry. Cities of district significance are often the administrative centers of the districts they are located in. The lives of approximately 22 million inhabitants (both urban and rural) are tied in with the socio-economic activities of small cities, which plays an important role in the development of suburbs and the Ukrainian economy.

The law "On the General Scheme of the Territorial Planning of Ukraine" is Ukraine's comprehensive general plan, which was adopted on 7 February 2002. It organizes small cities into five different categories:

1. cities that are adjacent to the geographical centers of local population;
2. cities with a significant recreational and health potential;
3. cities with a significant natural, historical and cultural potential;
4. cities that are important local centers of predominantly rural areas;
5. single-function cities.

The law "On the Approval of the National Program of the Development of Small Cities" was adopted on 4 March 2005. It organizes small cities into seven economic categories:

1. cities of predominantly industrial functions;
2. regional transportation crossroads;
3. sanatorium-resorts and recreational centers;
4. historical, historical-architectural, cultural, and tourist centers;
5. administrative centers of rural raions (districts);
6. business centers of local importance;
7. important local centers of society, cultural, communal, and other services.
Examples of cities of district significance
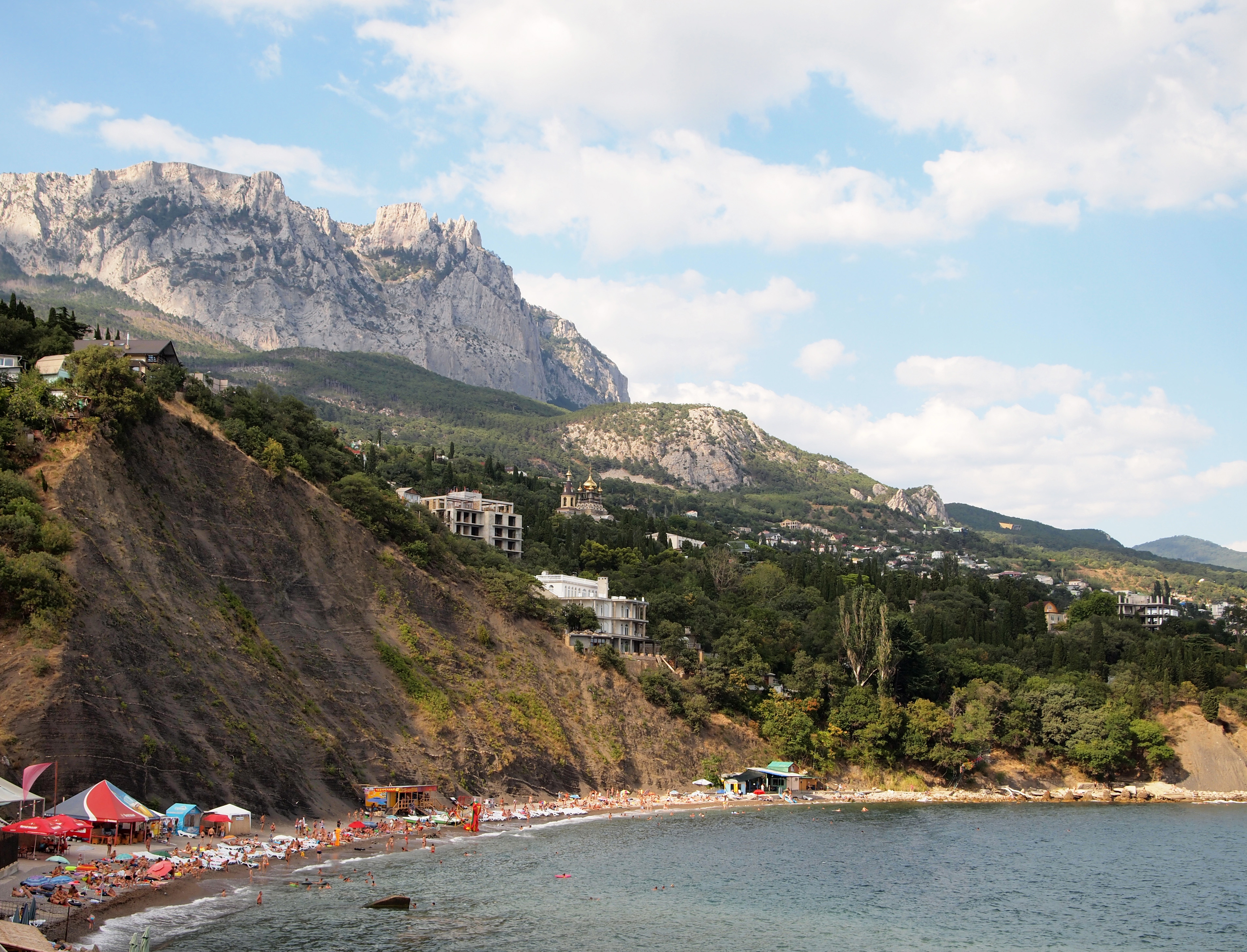
Alupka, Crimea (pop. 8,520), is a popular coastal resort city and home to the Vorontsov Palace, a national historical-architectural landmark of the 19th century.

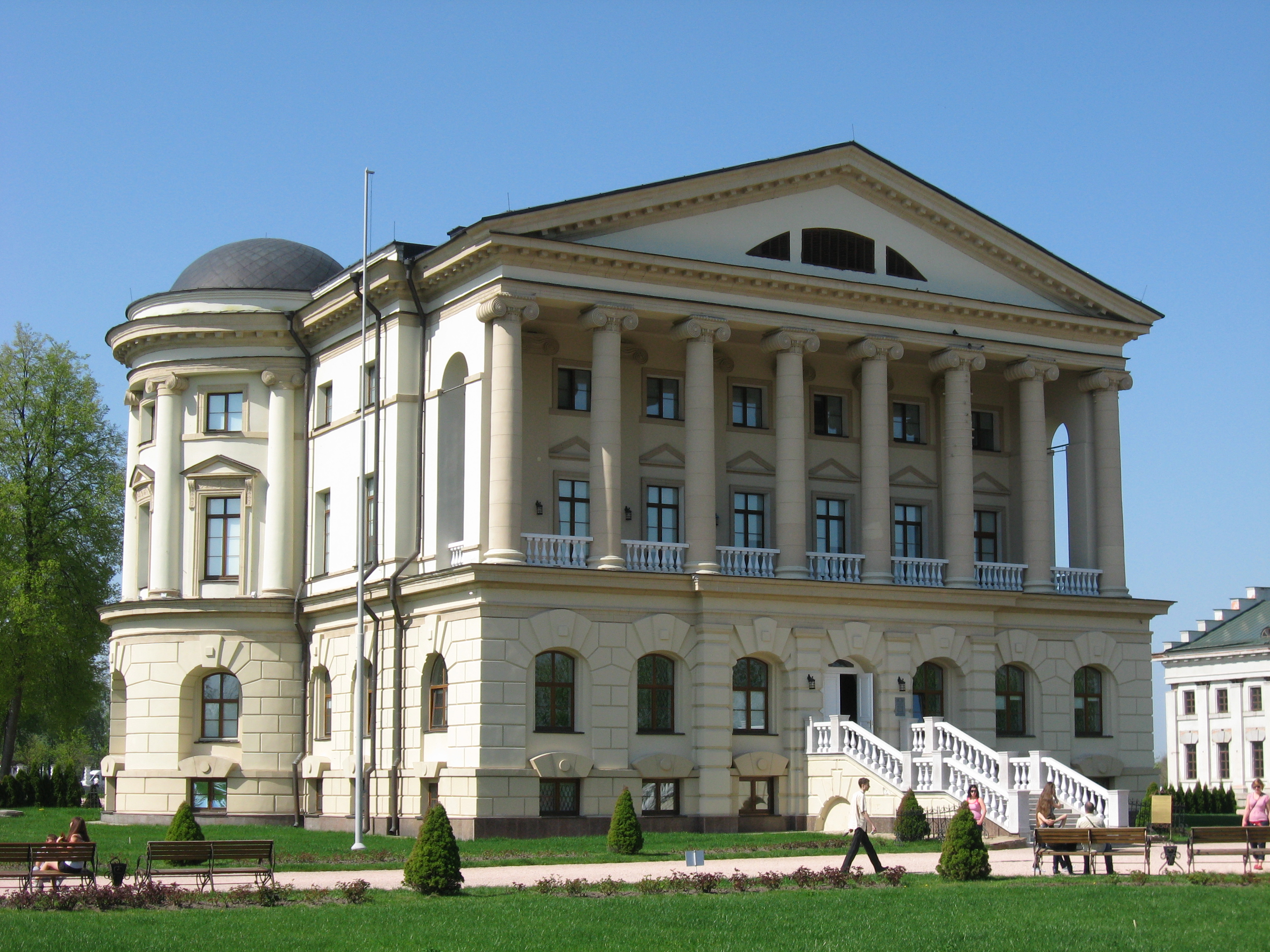
Baturyn, Chernihiv Oblast (pop. 2,716), was the capital of the Cossack Hetmanate from 1663–1708. It is the most recently designated city of district significance.

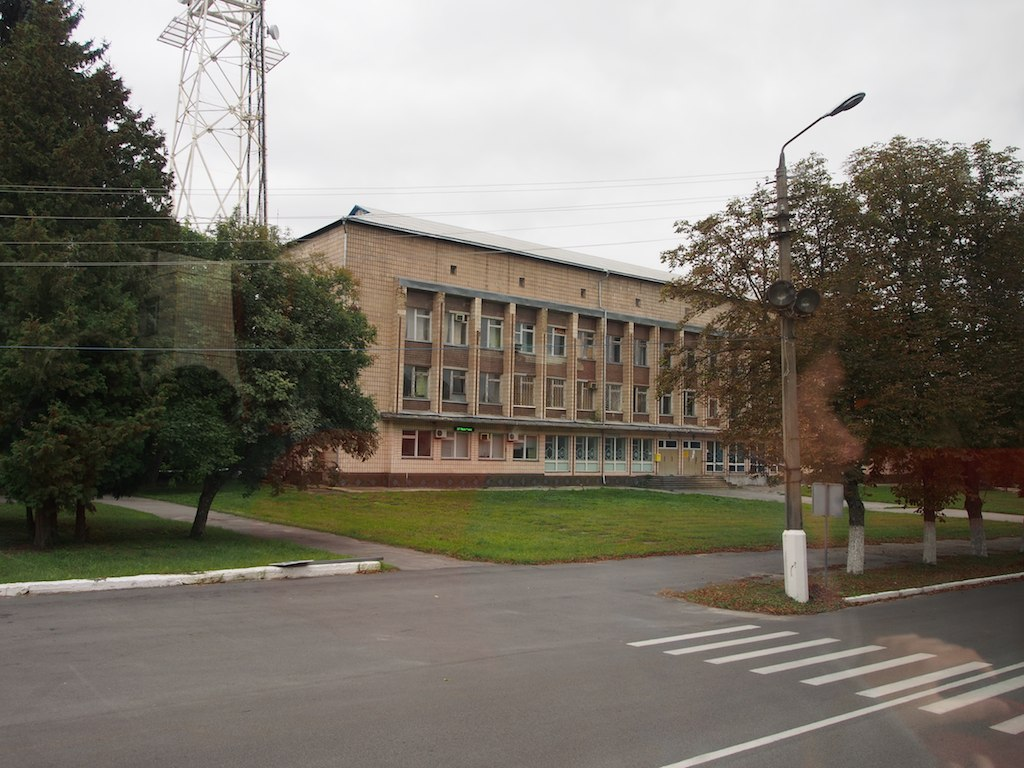
Chernobyl, Kyiv Oblast, (pop. negligible), was the administrative center of the Chernobyl Raion that was evacuated soon after the 1986 Chernobyl disaster.

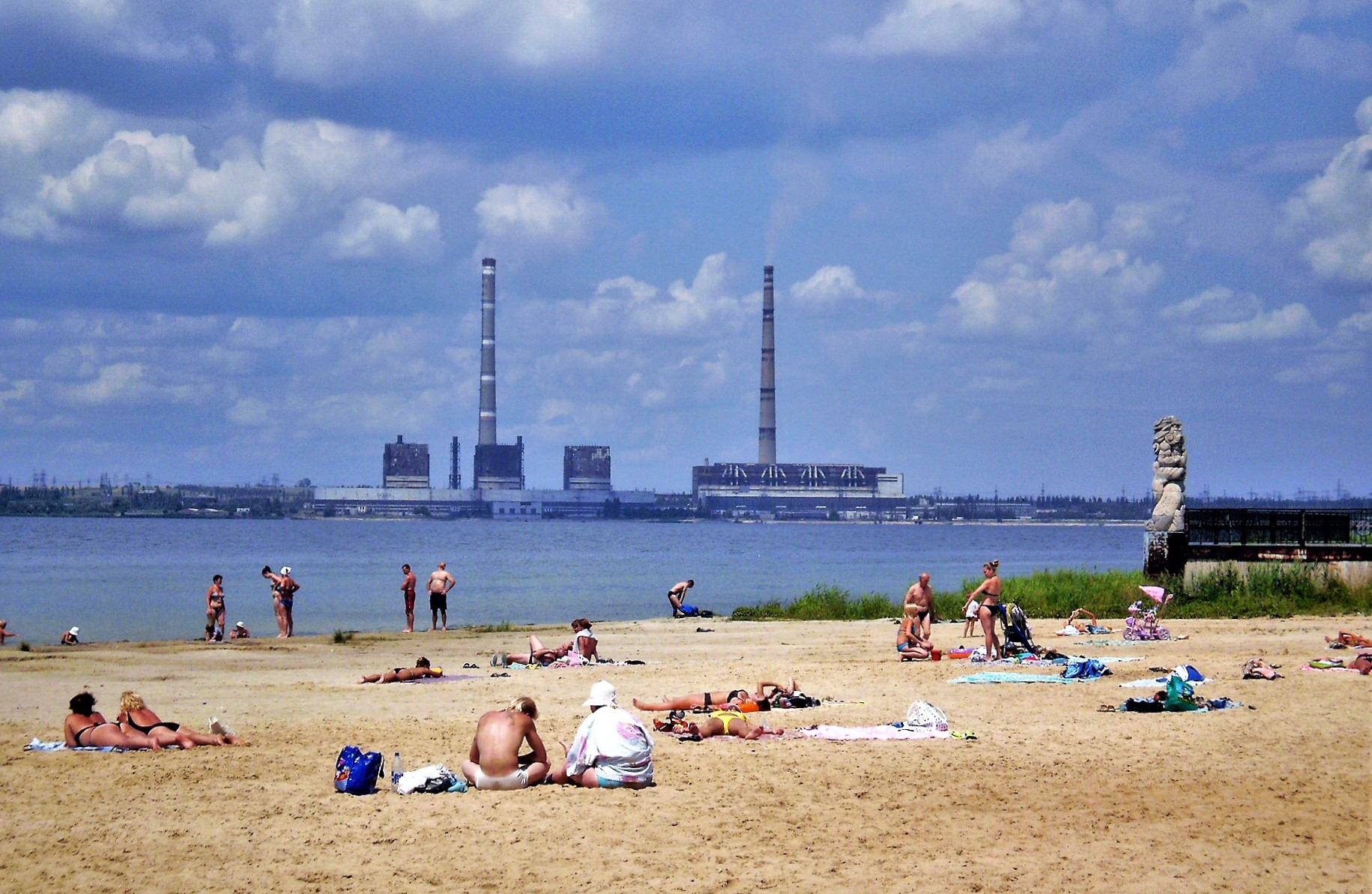
Svitlodarsk, Donetsk Oblast (pop. 12,164), is an industrial settlement first established in 1970 specifically for the Vuhlehirsk Power Station.
Population figures are as of 1 January 2013; Source: State Statistics Service of Ukraine

== Legal sphere ==
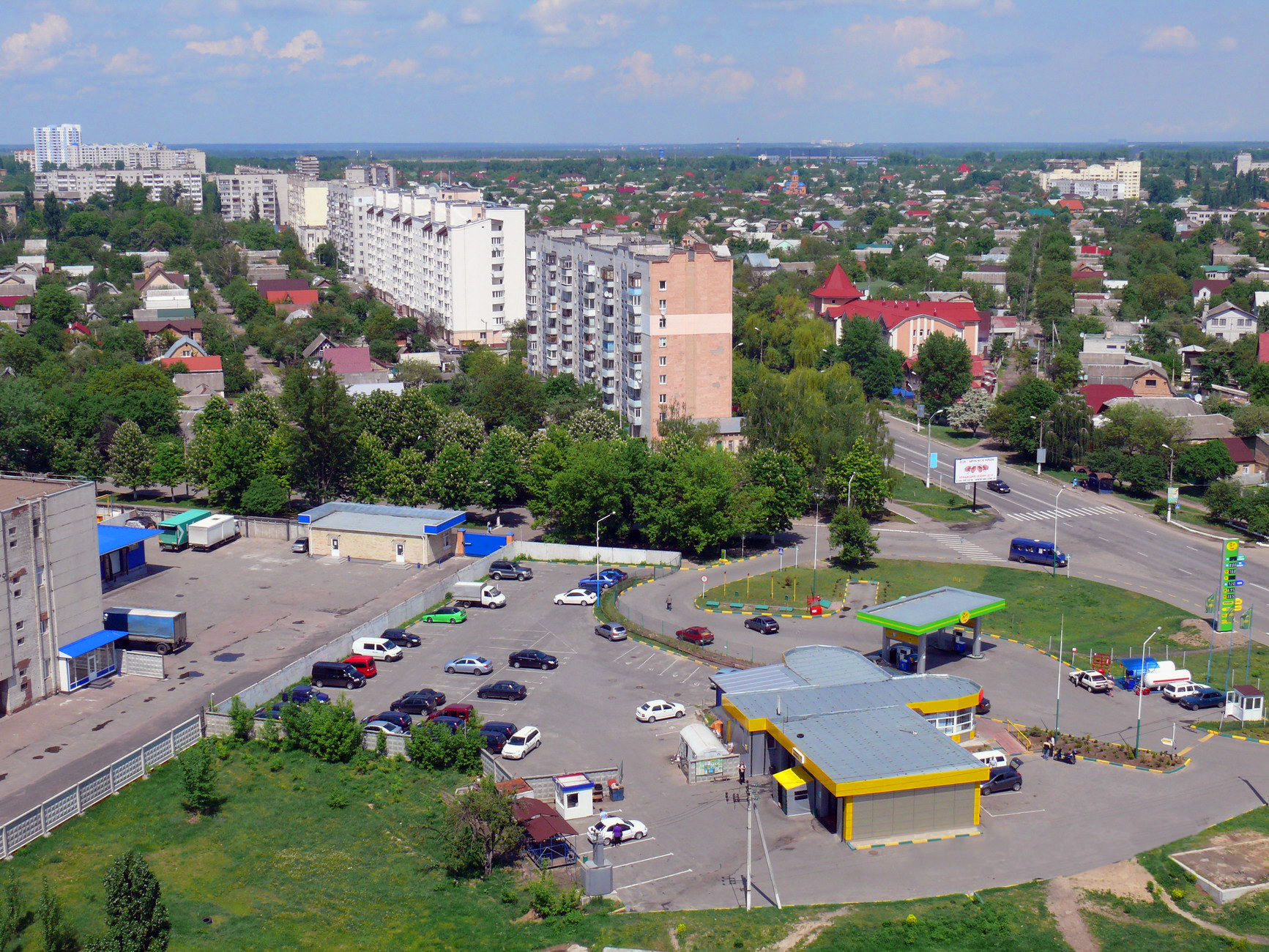
Out of all of the cities of district significance, the city of Boyarka, Kyiv Oblast has the largest population at 35,320 (2013 est.).

The Constitution of Ukraine and the 1997 law "On the Local Self-Governance in Ukraine" defines cities as independent units of administrative-territorial structures, which manage their own local self-government, economic, and financial activities. However, there is no clearly defined mechanism for designating populated places as cities of district significance under Ukrainian law. Rather, these cities are designated based on old Soviet laws such as the decree of the Presidium of the Verkhovna Rada of the Ukrainian Soviet Socialist Republic "On the Resolution of the Administrative-Territorial Structure of Ukrainian SSR" dated 12 March 1981. The legal competence of designating populated places as cities of district significance belongs to the Ukrainian parliament subject to proposals from the executive committees of regional and city councils.

The 1981 decree stipulates that populated places are designated as cities of district significance if they have important regional industry, communal utilities, and networks of social, cultural, and business enterprises. In addition, they have to have populations of over 10,000 people, of which not less than 2/3 were workers, employees, and their families. The presidium's decrees, "On the Resolution of the Administrative-Territorial Structure of Ukrainian SSR" and "On the Practice of Applying the Legislation on the Order of Naming and Renaming of Administrative-Territorial Units and Populated Places of the Republic" were to have expired after the Ukrainian parliament adopted the law "On the Administrative-Territorial Composition of Ukraine". However, to this day, such a law has not been passed.

== Governance ==
Local government in cities of district significance is delegated to their popularly elected mayoral administrations and legislative city councils, which derive their authority from the law "On the Local Self-Governance in Ukraine". These councils are local government areas that may often contain some urban-type settlements and rural localities under their jurisdiction aside from the respective cities themselves. Local elections take place nationwide every four years, and elect anywhere from 12 to 46 deputies, depending on the city's population.

Cities of district significance receive their funding through the rural raion state administrations they are subordinate to, amidst other sources of local revenue, as determined by the Budget Code of Ukraine. In 2015, the Association of Small Cities of Ukraine criticized the adoption of the 2015 Ukrainian budget, which they stated limited the authority of local government institutions throughout Ukraine, contrary to what was proposed by all five of the coalition parties in parliament as part of decentralization in Ukraine.

== Statistics ==
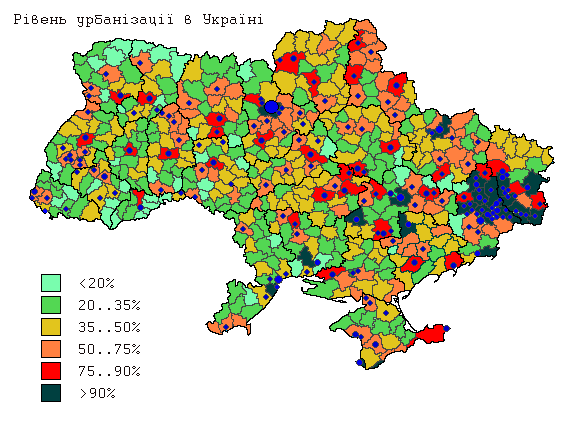
The 2010 urbanization rate: Lviv, Donetsk, and Luhansk oblasts have the largest number of cities of district significance with 30% of them.

Although not every small city is designated as a city of district significance, in 2003 there were a total of 305 such small cities, which is 3/4 of the total number of cities in Ukraine, and 13% of the total population (19% of the urban population). In 2003, 15 cities had a population of up to 5,000; 66 cities had populations between 5,000 and 10,000; 160 cities had populations between 10,000 and 20,000; 109 cities had populations between 20,000 and 50,000.

A majority of small cities (160 total) belong to the 10–20,000 population range.

The locations of cities of district significance throughout Ukraine is unevenly distributed throughout Ukraine's 24 oblasts (regions) and the Autonomous Republic of Crimea. The number of cities of district significance varies depending on the level of urbanization in a specific region.

The region with the largest number of cities of district significance is Lviv Oblast in western Ukraine with 35 such cities, which is close to 80% of the oblast's city population. Donetsk and Luhansk oblasts also have a proportionally larger number of cities of district significance with 24 (46% of the oblast's city population) and 23 (62% of the oblast's city population), respectfully.

Half of the cities of district significance are located within just six oblasts, not to mention that 94% of all of the cities in Ternopil Oblast and 82% in Chernivtsi Oblast are designated cities of district significance. These numbers are particularly higher than those in other regions throughout Ukraine due to a lower number of larger cities that could meet the status of cities of regional significance.

Out of the 276 cities of district significance, 89 of them (32% of them) are not administrative centers of their surrounding rural raions. Only four out of 24 cities of district significance in Donetsk Oblast are administrative centers; seven out of 23 in Luhansk Oblast; three out of seven in Dnipropetrovsk Oblast; and 17 out of 35 in Lviv Oblast. Every city of district significance in Cherkasy, Khmelnytskyi, Mykolaiv, Rivne, Zhytomytr, and Zakarpattia oblasts are also administrative centers of their respective raions.

== Nomenclature ==
A city of district significance can also be referred to as a city of district importance, depending on the translation from the original Ukrainian terminology. For the same category of cities in the Autonomous Republic of Crimea, the subject of a territorial dispute between Russia and Ukraine, the term for this type of urban populated place is a city of district subordination (Ukrainian: місто районного підпорядкування, misto raionnoho pidporiadkuvannia).

Cities of district significance and similarly named categories date back to the forms of local government and administrative divisions of Soviet Union. In countries of the former Soviet Union, these types of cities are subject to similar characteristics and economic categories as those that are located in Ukraine. In neighboring Russia, they are referred to as cities of district significance (Russian: город районного значения, gorod raionnogo znacheniya), while in Belarus, they are known as cities of district subordination (Belarusian: горад раённага падпарадкавання, horad rajonnaha padparadkavannja).

== See also ==
- Geography of Ukraine
- City of regional significance, similar category for larger cities
- ISO 3166-2:UA
- List of cities in Ukraine, sortable list of cities by region and population
- List of places named after people (Ukraine)
