= Chortitz Heritage Church =

Building in Manitoba, Canada

Coordinates: 49°32′46.72″N 96°49′50.32″W

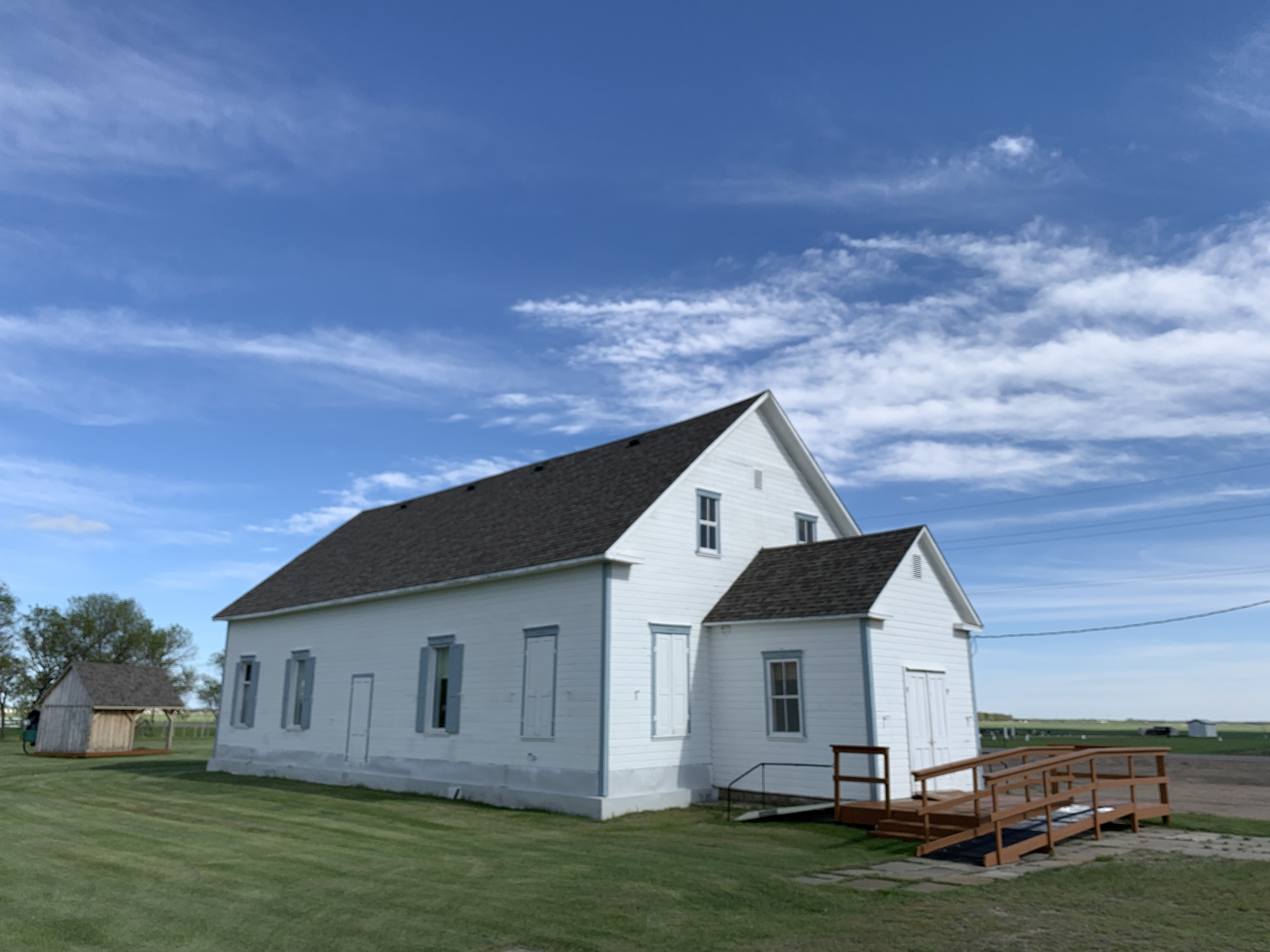
Historic Chortitz church in Randolph, 2021

The Chortitz Heritage Church is a former Mennonite church building located in the Canadian postal district of Randolph, Manitoba (originally known as Chortitz, Manitoba). The building was home to the Randolph Chortitzer Mennonite Church, one of the first Mennonite congregations in western Canada. Established in 1876 by Mennonite immigrants arriving from the Bergthal Colony in Russia, the original building was destroyed by fire and replaced by a new building in 1897, which still stands today.

As the Bergthal Mennonites spread out throughout the region and built more churches, they became known as the Die Mennonitische Gemeinde zu Chortitz, which is known today as the Christian Mennonite Conference (CMC). The Randolph church remained as the central church for many years, as it was the home church of the bishops. It was the last of the conference's churches to still use the German language exclusively and not use musical instruments to accompany singing. The aging congregation's dwindling numbers forced the closure of the Sunday school in the 1990s. The conference eventually closed the church in 2010.

After its closure, the Rural Municipality of Hanover assumed ownership of the building and designated it as a municipal heritage site. The adjacent cemetery is still owned and maintained by the CMC.
