= Kantserivka =

Kantserivka Канцерівка
- Rural settlement
- Location of Kantserivka in Zaporizhzhia Oblast
- Coordinates: 47°50′14″N 34°57′06″E
- Country: Ukraine
- Oblast: Zaporizhzhia Oblast
- District: Zaporizhzhia Raion
- Council: Dolynske Rural Council
- Founded: 1929

Area
  - Total: 0.66 km^{2} (0.25 sq mi)
- Elevation: 115 m (377 ft)

Population (2001)
  - Total: 193
  - Density: 290/km^{2} (760/sq mi)
- Time zone: UTC+2 (EET)
  - Summer (DST): UTC+3 (EEST)
- Postal code: 70421
- Area code: +380 612
- Website: http://rada.gov.ua/

Kantserivka (Ukrainian: Канцерівка) is a rural settlement in the Zaporizhzhia Raion (district) of Zaporizhzhia Oblast in southern Ukraine. Its population was 193 in the 2001 Ukrainian Census. Administratively, it belongs to the Dolynske Rural Council, a local government area.
