= Kushuhum settlement hromada =

Kushuhum settlement hromada Кушугумська селищна громада
- Hromada
- Interactive map of Kushuhum settlement hromada
- Country: Ukraine
- Oblast: Zaporizhzhia Oblast
- Raion: Zaporizhzhia Raion

Area
  - Total: 216.2 km^{2} (83.5 sq mi)

Population (2020)
  - Total: 17,120
  - Density: 79.19/km^{2} (205.1/sq mi)
- Settlements: 3
- Towns: 3

Kushuhum settlement hromada (Ukrainian: Кушугумська селищна громада) is a hromada of Ukraine, located in Zaporizhzhia Raion, Zaporizhzhia Oblast. Its administrative center is the town of Kushuhum.

It has an area of 216.2 square kilometres (83.5 mi^{2}) and a population of 17,120, as of 2020.

The hromada contains 3 towns: Kushuhum, Balabyne, and Malokaterynivka.

== See also ==
- List of hromadas of Ukraine
