= Belenkoye, Belgorod Oblast =

Belenkoye Беленькое
- Selo
- Location within Belgorod Oblast Location within Russia
- Coordinates: 50°34′N 35°54′E
- Country: Russia
- Region: Belgorod Oblast
- District: Borisovsky District
- Time zone: UTC+3:00

Belenkoye (Russian: Беленькое) is a rural locality (a selo) and the administrative center of Belyanskoye Rural Settlement, Borisovsky District, Belgorod Oblast, Russia. The population was 1,466 as of 2010. There are 10 streets.

== Geography ==
Belenkoye is located 11 km southwest of Borisovka (the district's administrative centre) by road. Zozuli is the nearest rural locality.
