= 2015 Ukraine budget =

2015 Budget of Ukrainian government
- Submitted: December 29, 2014
- Submitted by: Arseniy Yatseniuk
- Submitted to: 8th Rada
- Total revenue: ₴475,240 billion
- Total expenditures: ₴527,194 billion
- Deficit: ₴63,670 billion 3.7% of GDP
- Debt: ₴279,68 billion

The 2015 budget of Ukraine is the national budget for fiscal year 2015, which runs from January 1, 2015 to December 31, 2015. The budget takes the form of a budget bill which must be agreed by Verkhovna Rada in order to become final, but never receives the signature or veto of the President of Ukraine. Actual government spending will occur through later appropriations legislation that is signed into law.

== Overview ==
Ukraine's parliament approves austerity laws needed for the draft budget on the early morning of 29 December 2014. "This budget, like other budgets adopted in this hall, is far from perfect," Yatsenyuk said before the vote. "That’s why the budget must be reviewed no later than February 2015". The Rada was under pressure to approve a budget as soon as possible before the new financial year. Ukraine was seeking to unlock the next tranche of a $17 billion bailout loan from the IMF.

== Total revenues and spending ==
These tables are in billions of hryvnias. The draft budget for 2015.

=== Receipts ===
Item	Requested	Enacted
Individual income tax	45 000	
Social Security and other payroll tax		
Corporate income tax	33,573	
Excise tax	36,525	
Customs duties	31,717	
Estate and gift taxes		
National Bank of Ukraine	65,4	
Other miscellaneous receipts		
Total		

=== Outlays by agency ===
Ministry	Spendings
Economic Development and Trade	0,8
Infrastructure	0,032
Social Policy	98
Regional Development, Construction, and Communal Living	1,2
Education and Science, Youth and Sport	19,7
Culture	2,1
Defense	90
Health Security	6,5
Interior	14,8
Agrarian Policy and Food	1,1
Justice	5
Foreign Affairs	2,2
Finance	1,7
Energy and Coal Mining Industry	1,5
Ecology and Natural Resources	3,4
Emergencies	3,6
Information	0,004
Verkhovna Rada	0,5
Secretariat of Cabinet of Ministers	0,247
