= Bilenke, Kherson Oblast =

Village in Kherson Oblast, Ukraine

Bilenke Біленьке
- Interactive map of Bilenke
- Location of Bilenke Bilenke (Ukraine)
- Coordinates: 46°16′38″N 32°47′21″E
- Country: Ukraine
- Oblast: Kherson Oblast
- Raion: Skadovsk Raion
- Elevation: 34 m (112 ft)

Population (2001)
  - Total: 46
- Postal code: 75711
- Area code: +380 5537
- Climate: Cfa

Bilenke (Ukrainian: Біленьке) is a village in Skadovsk Raion, Kherson Oblast (province) of Ukraine.

== Demographics ==
Native language as of the Ukrainian Census of 2001:

- Ukrainian 93.48%
- Russian 6.52%
