= Bilenke, Luhansk Oblast =

Village in Luhansk Oblast, Ukraine

Bilenke Біленьке
- Location of Bilenke Bilenke (Ukraine)
- Coordinates: 48°21′12″N 39°53′57″E
- Country: Ukraine
- Oblast: Luhansk Oblast
- Raion: Dovzhansk Raion
- Hromada: Sorokyne urban hromada
- Elevation: 94 m (308 ft)

Population (2001)
  - Total: 166
- Postal code: 94425
- Area code: +380 6435
- Climate: Cfa

Bilenke (Ukrainian: Біленьке) is a village in Sorokyne urban hromada, Dovzhansk Raion, Luhansk Oblast (province) of Ukraine.

== Demographics ==
Native language as of the Ukrainian Census of 2001:

- Ukrainian 4.82%
- Russian 95.18%
