= Belenkoye, Altai Krai =

Belenkoye Беленькое
- Selo
- Location within Altai Krai Location within Russia
- Coordinates: 50°59′N 80°07′E
- Country: Russia
- Region: Altai Krai
- District: Uglovsky District
- Time zone: UTC+7:00

Belenkoye (Russian: Беленькое) is a rural locality (a selo) in Laptevsky Selsoviet, Uglovsky District, Altai Krai, Russia. The population was 267 as of 2013. It was founded in 1860. There are 2 streets.

== Geography ==
Belenkoye is located 66 km south of Uglovskoye (the district's administrative centre) by road. Topolnoye is the nearest rural locality.
