= Chortitza Colony =

Mennonite settlement in the Russian Empire

Coordinates: 47°51′36″N 35°00′34″E

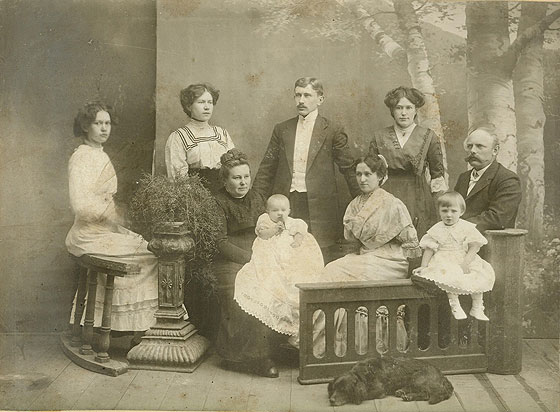
Family of Mennonites from near Aleksandrovsk (Zaporizhzhia), All-Russian Empire

Chortitza Colony was a volost, a subdivision of Yekaterinoslav uezd within Yekaterinoslav Governorate in the Russian Empire, now in Ukraine. During the reign of Catherine the Great, the area was annexed by Russia after the liquidation of the Zaporozhian Sich. It was granted to Plautdietsch-speaking settlers (better known as Russian Mennonites) for colonization northwest of Khortytsia Island. The territory of the former colony is now split between the city of Zaporizhzhia and its adjacent Zaporizhzhia Raion, within Zaporizhia it is part of Voznesenskyi and Khortytskyi districts.

Chortitza was founded in 1789 by Mennonite settlers of Dutch ancestry from the Vistula delta and consisted of many villages. It was the first of many Mennonite settlements in the Russian Empire. Because the Mennonites living in these villages emigrated or were evacuated or deported at the end of World War II, or emigrated after the collapse of the Soviet Union, few Mennonites are living in the area today.

After establishment of the Soviet Union, the colony was converted into Khortytsia Raion, a predecessor of Zaporizhzhia Raion. In 1929–30 as part of the Soviet policy of korenizatsia, it was converted into a national district promoting development of the German language culture.

== Background ==
Vistula delta Mennonites, mostly of Dutch descent, had lived in the Vistula delta in the Kingdom of Poland from the middle of 16th century. Because of their fast growing population, finding more arable land was a concern. When the region became part of the Kingdom of Prussia in 1772 through the First Partition of Poland, the Prussian Government enacted a law making it difficult for Mennonites to acquire land. This compelled a significant part of the Mennonite population to seek better opportunities in nearby cities, Danzig in particular.

Believing agriculture to be the backbone of the Russian economy, in 1763 Catherine II of Russia issued a Manifesto inviting Europeans to farm Russia's unoccupied agricultural lands. Though land opportunities were scattered throughout Russia, the largest tracts available were along the banks and watershed of the Volga River south of Saratov. Colonization by non-Russians in that area also served as a buffer zone against invading Mongol hordes to the east. Colonization attempts were intensified in 1774 after the Russo-Turkish War when Potemkin was appointed governor general of South Russia which included territory recently won from the Sultan of the Ottoman Empire.

Colonization agents advertised the availability of crown lands to people throughout Europe. One of these was Georg von Trappe, who visited the Mennonites of Danzig in 1786. The Mennonite congregations elected two delegates, Jakob Höppner and Johann Bartsch, who von Trappe arranged to send to Russia at government expense. They departed in the fall of 1786, sailing first to Riga, then traveling cross country, arriving at the Dnieper in late November. From here they sailed down the river looking for a suitable site. They met Potemkin at Kremenchuk and were presented to Catherine in May, as she was inspecting her new territories. They found a suitable settlement location, then returned home by way of Saint Petersburg, where they met with Crown Prince Paul, who confirmed the promises made by von Trappe.

The special privileges included guarantees of religious freedom, exemption from military service, 70 ha (175 acres) of free land for each family, exemption from swearing oaths in legal proceedings, ability to establish their own schools and teach in their own language, the right to restrict the establishment of taverns and the ability to make their own beverages. These rights and privileges were beyond those enjoyed by common Russian peasants. There were restrictions that applied to all colonists, such as a restrictions against proselytizing among Russian Orthodox Church members and revocation of privileges for anyone leaving or marrying outside of the colony. Land could be inherited, so long as it remained part of the settlement. A farm could not be subdivided among heirs in order to keep intact and not to degrade the model farming practices that were the intention of the government.

Upon their return, Höppner and Bartsch found that four families had already departed for Riga and hundreds more were eager to immigrate. The West Prussian authorities, though restricting the expansion of Mennonite settlements locally, did not want the wealth of the Mennonites to leave the country. Only the poorest families were granted passports.

== Settlement ==
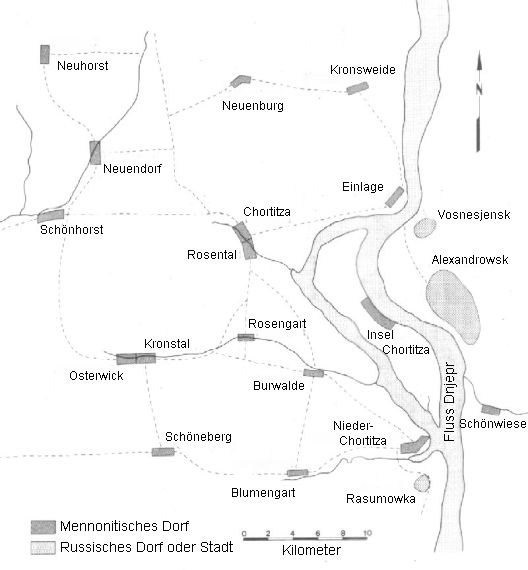
Khortytsia map

Mennonite settlers, 228 families in all, set out for Russia in the winter of 1787, arriving in Dubrovna (today in Belarus) in fall of 1788, where they over-wintered. Early in 1789 they traveled down the Dnieper River to the settlement site, on the banks of the Dnieper, near present-day Kherson. Their original destination was now a battlefield because of renewed Russo-Turkish hostilities, necessitating an alternate location. They received land at a new site on Khortytsia, a small tributary of the Dnieper, near Alexandrovsk (present-day Zaporizhzhia).

The pioneering years were extremely difficult. The more prosperous Mennonites brought their possessions by wagon, while the others sent them by barge. When the barges arrived they found that the containers had been ransacked and valuables removed or ruined by rain. Similarly, building material sent down-river was stolen before it arrived. Many of the settlers were city laborers and tradesmen with no knowledge of farming, and the farmers among them found the dry steppes unsuitable to their former farming methods.

Internal friction among the settlers, rooted in a long-standing division separating Frisian and Flemish branches of the church who lived in different ways, was compounded by the lack of ministerial leadership. Church leaders are traditionally selected from among the lay brothers of the congregation and were expected to serve for life as unpaid pastors. Because pastors were expected to support themselves, they were usually chosen from among those who had a business or farm sufficient for support. Because only the poorest Mennonites had been allowed to leave Prussia, there were no ministers among the settlers.

Initially families built temporary shelters such as sod dugouts and tents while a few tried to live in their wagons. Höppner and Bartsch were able to build substantial homes. Land was divided among the families and each lived on their own land. In response to the lawlessness of the region, they found that it was more practical to group themselves together in villages of fifteen to thirty families.

As their difficulties mounted, the settlers accused Höppner and Bartsch of keeping government money intended for colony use. Both men were excommunicated from the Flemish church and the authorities were convinced to arrest Höppner. Bartsch confessed his wrongdoing and was reinstated into his congregation. Höppner was soon released from prison, moved to Alexandrovsk and joined the Frisian group. In 1889 a monument commemorating the colony's centennial was placed on Höppner's grave. It has since been moved to Mennonite Heritage Village in Steinbach, Manitoba.

Initially eight villages were organized with Khortytsia as the governmental center. They included Khortytsia (Chortitza), Einlage (Kichkas), Insel Khortytsia (Ostriv Khortytsia), Kronsweide (Volodymyrivske), Neuenburg (Malyshivka), Neuendorf (Shyroke), Rosental (Kantserivka), and Schönhorst (Ruchaivka). Another 180 families arrived in 1797–1798 to found Kronsgarten (Polovitsa) and Schönwiese (Shenvitse). The latter was the sole village established on the east bank of the Dnieper. Nieder Chortitza (Nyzhnia Khortytsia) and Burwalde (Baburka) were founded in 1803, Kronstal (Dolynske) in 1809, Osterwick (Pavlivka, Zaporizhzhia Oblast) in 1812, Schöneberg (Smoliane) in 1816, and Blumengart (Kapustiane) and Rosengart (Novoslobidka) in 1824.

When the next wave of Mennonite settlers came to Russia In 1803, they over-wintered in Chortitza Colony before moving on to form the Molotschna settlement. The money spent by the new group during their stay in turn helped the Khortytsia settlement.

== List of the Chortitza volost settlements ==
1. Chortitza (today Verkhnia Khortytsia (Ukrainian: Верхня Хортиця Upper Khortytsia), over Khortytsia river, 977 people, 102 homesteads.
2. Neuendorf (today Shyroke (Ukrainian: Широке), over Tomakivka river, 1,080 people, 115 homesteads.
3. Einlage (today Kichkas (Ukrainian: Кічкас)), over Dnieper, 940 people, 99 homesteads.
4. Kronsweide (today Volodymyrivske (Ukrainian: Володимирівське)), over Hadiacha river, 864 people, 54 homesteads.
5. Osterwick (today Dolynske (Ukrainian: Долинське), over Serednia Khortytsia river, 855 people, 121 homesteads.
6. Rosental (today Kantserivka (Ukrainian: Канцерівка), over Khortytsia river, 796 people, 81 homesteads.
7. Nieder-Chortitza (today Nyzhnia Khortytsia (Ukrainian: Нижня Хортиця Lower Khortytsia), over Dnieper, 784 people, 107 homesteads.
8. Burwalde (today Baburka Ukrainian: Бабурка), over Serednia Khortytsia river, 489 people, 63 homesteads.
9. Insel Chortitza (today Khortytsia neighborhood/island (Voznesenivskyi District) (Ukrainian: Хортиця)), river island surrounded by Dnieper, 452 people, 23 homesteads.
10. Neuenberg (today Malyshivka (Ukrainian: Малишівка)), over Malysheva river, 423 people, 38 homesteads.
11. Schöneberg (today Smoliane (Ukrainian: Смоляне), over Nyzhnia Khortytsia river, 405 people, 56 homesteads.
12. Kronstal (today eastern part of Dolynske (Osterwick)), over Serednia Khortytsia river, 376 people, 60 homesteads.
13. Rosenhart (today Novoslobidka (Ukrainian: Новослобідка)), over Serednia Khortytsia river, 256 people, 47 homesteads.
14. Neuhorst (today Zelenyi Hai (Ukrainian: Зелений Гай Green Grove)), over Ternuvata river (left tributary of Tomakivka), 180 people, 21 homesteads.
15. Blumenhart (today abandoned village of Kapustiane (Ukrainian: Капустяне)), over Nyzhnia Khortytsia river, 172 people, 42 homesteads.
16. Kronsweide (today Velykyi Luh (Ukrainian: Великий Луг Great Meadow), part of Zaporizhzhia) over Dnieper, 144 people, 9 homesteads.
17. Schönhorst (today Ruchayivka Ukrainian: Ручаївка)), over Tomakivka river, 105 people, 93 homesteads.

== Local government ==
Mennonite colonies were self-governing with little intervention from the Russian authorities. The village, the basic unit of government, was headed by an elected magistrate who oversaw village affairs. Each village controlled its own school, roads and cared for the poor. Male landowners decided local matters at village assemblies.

All of the Chortitza villages formed a district headed by a superintendent and regional bureau that could administer corporal punishment and handle other matters affecting the villages in common. Insurance and fire protection were handled at the regional level, as well as dealing with delinquents and other social problems. Chortitza, along with the other Mennonite settlements, functioned as a democratic state, enjoying freedoms beyond those of ordinary Russian peasants.

== Education ==
At a time when compulsory education was unknown in Europe, the Mennonite colonies formed an elementary school in each village. Students learned practical skills such as reading and writing German and arithmetic. Religion was included as was singing in many schools. The teacher was typically a craftsperson or herder, untrained in teaching, who fit class time around his occupation. The curriculum evolved as professional teachers gradually took their place. By the late Nineteenth Century the six grades included classes in religion, German, Russian, arithmetic, geography, history, and natural science, with difficulty appropriate to the grade.

The Central Secondary School (Zentralschule) was started in Chortitza in 1842. Over three thousand pupils attended the Central School with up to 8% of the colonists receiving a secondary education. A decree by the Ministry of Education in 1881 prohibited coeducation in secondary schools necessitating the foundation of a separate high school for girls (the Mädchenschule) in 1895. The four-year secondary programs taught religion, history, arithmetic, science, Russian and German language and literature, geography, penmanship, and art. Girls received instruction in needlecraft as well.

The co-educational teacher training seminary, founded as a separate institution in 1914, expanded what had been a two-year extension of the secondary school to a three-year program. Third year students did their practice teaching at the nearby model elementary school (Musterschule).

By the early twentieth century, a growing number of students extended their education to gimnaziia, schools of trade and commerce, and universities in Switzerland, Germany, as well as Russia.

== Daughter colonies ==
As the population of the colony grew and land became scarce, new areas for resettlement were sought. In 1864 land was rented from Grand Duke Michael Nikolaevich of Russia to form Fürstenland, which by 1911 consisted of five villages with 1800 residents. Borozenko was formed in 1865 and by 1915 totaled five villages with a population of 600. Further colonies were established at Bergthal (1836), Yazykovo (1869), Nepluyevka (1870), Schlachtin and Baratov (1871), Ignatyevo (1888), and Borissovo (1892)

== Economy ==
Occupations in 1819
| Number | Occupation |
|---|---|
| 2 | Clockmakers |
| 9 | Turners |
| 2 | Coopers |
| 88 | Joiners |
| 26 | Carpenters |
| 16 | Smiths |
| 49 | Weavers |
| 1 | Dyer |
| 25 | Tailors |
| 20 | Shoemakers |
| several | Brewers |
| several | Millers |
from 18 villages with a total of 2888 residents.

Eventually an economy developed and the Chortitza settlement prospered. In the course of the 19th century the population of Chortitza multiplied, and daughter colonies were founded. Part of the settlement moved to Canada in 1870. Since Chortitza was the first Mennonite settlement, it is known as the Old Colony. Those who moved from Chortitza to North America are often referred to as Old Colony Mennonites and are more conservative than most other Russian Mennonites in North America.

The settlement received income from communal land and enterprises. A public ferry across the Dnieper earned between two and three thousand rubles annually, the municipal merino flock totaled about a thousand animals in 1820 and a distillery provided additional community income. These funds were used for large undertakings, such as forming daughter colonies for the growing population.

The settlement's first economic setback was overcome through the effort of skilled craftsmen. Industry in Chortitza developed in the middle of the 19th century, mainly milling and production of agricultural machinery and clocks. The growing landless population found work in these factories. Three large factories, Lepp & Wallmann, Abram J. Koop, Hildebrand & Pries and two smaller factories, Thiessen und Rempel produced agricultural machinery in Chortitza and Rosental. The machinery was used not just by Mennonites, but all over Russia. In later years, the three largest factories were combined into a single business and, after the Russian Revolution of 1917, produced tractors and automobiles under the Saporoschetz brand. The business was confiscated from the former Mennonite owners shortly after the 1917 revolution and today is part of AvtoZAZ-Daewoo.

== Unrest ==
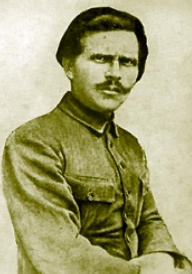
Nestor Makhno

A long period of prosperity was broken by World War I (1914–1918), which led into the Russian Civil War, interrupting the lives of Chortitza's residents. Mennonites served as medics during the war, caring for injured soldiers. For a short time after the war, the German army occupied Ukraine, including Chortitza. After the Armistice at the end of 1918 the German soldiers withdrew. A self-defense force was organized within the villages, perhaps with help and weapons from the German army. Some of the Mennonites took part in this force, even though they traditionally opposed military service on religious grounds. Civil war raged from 1917 to 1921 as the communists tried to take power. Things were chaotic in Ukraine during this period of constant revolution. Nestor Makhno's army would target the Mennonite colonies. Initially the villages attempted to protect themselves with the help of the self-defense force. After Makhno entered into one of his alliances with the Red Army, it was no longer possible to resist his forces.

During the period mid October 1919 to the last week in December of that year, Makhno's army occupied all the colony's villages and much of the district up to Ekaterinoslav (current Dnipro). The Makhnovists invaded the colonists' homes, murdered, raped, and spread venereal diseases and typhus. The latter epidemic ultimately infected roughly 95% of the local population, of which more than 10% died.

== Communism ==
After communists gained control over the region, they began to appropriate grain from the landowners. Eventually the population began to starve and epidemics spread. During this time Mennonites began organizing to immigrate to Canada. In 1923 many of the former large landowners, ministers and internal refugees migrated to Canada, mainly to Manitoba and Saskatchewan, with credit provided by the Canadian Pacific Railway.

In 1926 the village of Einlage was abandoned to make way for the flooding from the Dnieper Hydroelectric Station dam. Many other Chortitza Mennonites suffered under the dekulakization programs of the 1920s and the collectivization of 1930. Confiscated land was given to peasants, usually Communist Party members. In May 1931, with these newest citizens of Chortitza village voted out the remaining Mennonite landowners. From 1929 to 1940, 1500 men of a total population of 12,000 were exiled to hard labor in the far north or Siberia.

== World War II ==
As World War II began in 1941, the Soviet government intended to deport all the residents of Chortitza to Siberia, but the German Wehrmacht advanced so quickly, the plan could not be executed. Under German occupation, the population made a degree of recovery. But by 1943 German people were evacuated to Reichsgau Wartheland, and the Wehrmacht retreated from the Soviet Union. As the Red Army entered German territory they seized refugees attempting to flee the Soviet Union. Some escaped by going deeper into Germany, but as Soviet citizens, the Allies delivered them back to the Soviets. With a few exceptions, the former residents of Chortitza were deported to Siberia and Kazakhstan. There they were simply released on the bare steppe. Many did not survive. They shared the fate of other Germans from Russia.

== Scattering ==
After the restriction of free travel was eased in 1956, a few returned to their old home of Chortitza. Today mostly Ukrainians and Russians live there. A few Mennonites, who have either a Ukrainian parent or spouse, resettled there. Mennonite churches and ministries can now be found in Zaporizhia oblast. In Kazakhstan, Mennonites have gathered in industrial cities such as Karaganda.

At the end of the 1980s many Mennonites in the Soviet Union began to immigrate to Germany. Today many of the former residents of Chortitza and their descendants are found in Germany and Canada.

== See also ==
- Bergthal Colony
