= Bilenke rural hromada =

Bilenke rural hromada Біленьківська селищна громада
- Hromada
- Interactive map of Bilenke rural hromada
- Country: Ukraine
- Oblast: Zaporizhzhia Oblast
- Raion: Zaporizhzhia Raion

Area
  - Total: 357.2 km^{2} (137.9 sq mi)

Population (2020)
  - Total: 9,775
  - Density: 27.37/km^{2} (70.88/sq mi)
- Settlements: 9
- Villages: 9

Bilenke rural hromada (Ukrainian: Біленьківська селищна громада) is a hromada of Ukraine, located in Zaporizhzhia Raion, Zaporizhzhia Oblast. Its administrative center is the village of Bilenke.

It has an area of 357.2 square kilometres (137.9 mi^{2}) and a population of 9,775, as of 2020.

The hromada contains 9 settlements, which are all villages:

- Bilenke
- Bilenke-Pershe
- Kanivske
- Lysohirka
- Marivka
- Novoserhiivka
- Smoliane
- Udilenske
- Chervonodniprovka
- Chikosh-Horonda

== See also ==
- List of hromadas of Ukraine
