= Christian Mennonite Conference =

The Christian Mennonite Conference, formerly known as the Chortitzer Mennonite Conference (German: Die Mennonitische Gemeinde zu Chortitz), is a small body of Mennonites in western Canada.

== History ==
The forerunners of this group came to Manitoba from Russia in 1874. They were first known as Bergthalers, but eventually became known as the Chortitzer Church because their bishop, Gerhard Wiebe (1827–1900), lived near the village of Chortitz (now known as Randolph), and made the local church his home church. This group was very conservative. They sang without harmony (parts), restricting the singing to a melody only. They allowed neither Sunday schools nor evening services. The German language was used exclusively in church services. The bishop and ministers possessed most of the authority in the conference, allowing for little local autonomy.

The departure of the more conservative families to Paraguay in 1948 left the more progressive families remaining in Canada. This opened the way for a number of changes in the conference. A new emphasis was placed on Christian education, with the addition of Bible studies, Sunday school, Sunday evening services, and young people's programs. Exclusive use of the German language made way for the adoption of English - first in Sunday School, and then in the Sunday morning services. A mission board was formed to conduct the mission outreach of the conference, and now a number of conference members serve in different parts of the world.

Today, the conference has just over 1,000 baptized members in 9 congregations. The bishop is the spiritual leader of the conference. Although all land and property is owned by the conference, each congregation is nearly autonomous and presides over its ministerial elections, spiritual matters, ministries, and budget. The bishop is responsible for the ordination of ministers and deacons. The conference, which has its main office in Steinbach, Manitoba, prints The Chronicle as its official publication and has a radio program ministry that ministers to German-speaking Mennonites in South America, Mexico, and Canada.

The conference officially changed its name to Christian Mennonite Conference in 2015.

== Congregations ==
- Fort St. John, British Columbia
- Grunthal, Manitoba
- Mitchell, Manitoba
- New Bothwell, Manitoba
- Niverville, Manitoba
- Prespatou, British Columbia
- Steinbach, Manitoba
- Weidenfeld, Manitoba
- Winkler, Manitoba

=== Former congregations ===
- Osler, Saskatchewan
- Randolph, Manitoba
- Rosengard, Manitoba
- Schanzenfeld, Manitoba
- Winnipeg, Manitoba

== See also ==
- Chortitz Heritage Church
- Bergthal Colony
