= Khortytskyi District =

City district of Zaporizhzhia, Ukraine

Khortytskyi District Хортицький район
- Urban district
- Administrative map of Zaporizhzhia; the Khortytskyi District is indicated by the number 6.

- Location of the urban district on a map of Zaporizhzhia Oblast.
- Coordinates: 47°48′59″N 35°03′17″E
- Country: Ukraine
- Municipality: Zaporizhzhia Municipality
- Established: 19 January 1995

Government
  - Deputy chairman: Dmytro But

Area
  - Total: 18.81 km^{2} (7.26 sq mi)

Population (2012)
  - Total: 117,871 ▼
  - Density: 6,266/km^{2} (16,230/sq mi)
- Time zone: UTC+2 (EET)
  - Summer (DST): UTC+3 (EEST)
- Postal index: 330123
- Area code: +380 61
- KOATUU: 2310137300
- Website: w1.c1.rada.gov.ua/pls/z7502/A005?rdat1=19.01.2015&rf7571=13151

The Khortytskyi District (Ukrainian: Хортицький район, Khortyts'kyi raion) is one of seven administrative urban districts (raions) of the city of Zaporizhzhia, located in southern Ukraine. Its population was 122,575 in the 2001 Ukrainian Census, and 117,871 as of 2012.

== Geography ==
It is named after the nearby Khortytsia island, a national cultural reserve. The raion is located in the southern portion of the city, on the right-bank of the Dnipro River, neighboring the villages of Baburka and Novoslobidka in Zaporizhzhia Oblast. Its total area is 18.81 km^{2} (7.26 mi^{2}).

== History ==
The territory of the Khortytskyi District was first inhabited by German-speaking Mennonites settling the Chortitza Colony in the late 18th century. By the 1960s, the first residential neighborhoods were being constructed in the vicinity, which at the time administratively belonged to the city's Leninskyi District.

On 19 January 1995, the Khortytskyi District was established out of a portion of the Leninskyi District by a decree of the Verkhovna Rada, Ukraine's parliament.
