= Bergthal Colony =

Former Russian Mennonite settlement in Ukraine

Coordinates: 47°15′04″N 37°11′05″E

The Bergthal Colony is a former Russian Mennonite settlement in what is now Ukraine.

The colony consisted of five villages – Schönfeld, Heuboden, Bergthal, Schönthal, and Friedrichsthal – which were settled during the years 1836 to 1852 by 149 landless families from the Chortitza Colony. The settlement was located on the Bodni, a small tributary of the Berda River about 200 km southeast of Zaporizhia. During the 1870s, their leader, Bishop Gerhard Wiebe, persuaded the entire colony, consisting of about 500 families, to emigrate to Manitoba, Canada. The most conservative factions of the Bergthal Colony later established new colonies in Mexico, Paraguay, and Bolivia, while the remainder spread out through Western Canada and the Midwestern United States. Some descendants of the colony, particularly those in Mexico, continue to be known as Bergthaler, but most have dropped the Bergthaler identity.

The current names of the five villages are: Ksenivka, Serhiivka, Respublica, Novoromanivka, and Fedorivka. The central village of Respublica is located at 47.251528 N, 37.198849 E.

== See also ==
- Sommerfelder (Sommerfelder Mennonite group)

== See also ==
- Chortitza Colony
- Chortitzer Mennonite Conference
