= Local government in Ukraine =

Local government in Ukraine (Ukrainian: Місцева влада, romanized: Mistseva vlada) consists of two systems based on the administrative divisions of Ukraine. There are 24 oblasts, one autonomous republic, and two cities with special status, with each region further divided into raions (districts) and then hromadas.

In Ukraine, relations regarding the organization and activity of entities of local government are regulated by the Constitution of Ukraine, laws "About local self-governance in Ukraine" (1997) and "About local state administrations" (1999).

Deputies in Ukrainian local councils work on a voluntary basis.

== Concept and structure ==
Two systems of local government:

1. a system of local self government as public government (like public sector) of territorial community (hromada) and formed by them municipal governing bodies (municipal authority) (local councils)
2. a system of local bodies of state executive power that is represented by local state administrations (see Chief of local state administration)

The local state administrations are bodies (agents) of state executive power at local level that are subordinated to bodies of executive power of higher level, and also accountable to and under the control of the relevant representative bodies (local councils) in the field of the powers delegated to them. Their functions have state nature (reflect the state interest), predetermined by tasks and problems of state significance and they are the embodiment of the policy of deconcentration. At functional level the local state executive government does not have independent rights and powers distinct and separate from the rights and powers of bodies of the central state government.

As for territorial communities, they are natural corporations of local residents who carry out self-government directly or through local self-governing authorities and exist on principles of self-organization and are not subordinated hierarchically to other government entities.

The village, township, or city mayor is the chief executive of the local community at the village (or association of several villages), town or city level, elected by universal, equal and direct suffrage by secret ballot every four years in the manner prescribed by law. The village or township mayor leads the executive committee of the respective village, township or city council, and presides at its meetings.

The deputies elected in local elections work on a voluntary basis. Meaning that they work for free for 5 years in a row.

In 2015 a new administrative unit amalgamated hromada was created meaning settlement councils, rural councils and a city of district significance can create a new administrative unit. This new administrative unit was created to help the financial and administrate power and independence of rural Ukraine. According to December 2019 draft constitutional changes submitted to the Verkhovna Rada by President Volodymyr Zelenskyy the amalgamated hromadas were planned to replace the raions of Ukraine.

== Powers ==
Bodies subject to local self-government law may be separate arms of the executive. Executive bodies of villages, townships and city councils have jurisdiction in the following areas:

- Socioeconomic and cultural development, planning and accounting
- Budgeting and finance
- Management of municipal property
- Housing, consumer and commercial services, catering, transport and communications
- Construction
- Education, health, culture, physical culture and sports
- Land use and environmental protection
- Social welfare
- Foreign economic activity
- Defense
- Administrative affairs and territorial structure
- Protection of rights, freedoms and lawful interests of citizens and others

At meetings of the village, township and city council, the following issues are decided:

- Makeup of the body's executive committee
- Local referendums
- Transfer of funds, logistical and other resources necessary
- Association with other local bodies
- Approval of socioeconomic and cultural development, target programs and other issues of local government
- Approval of local budgets and amendments
- Approving performance budgeting report
- Local taxes and duties within the limits set by law
- Issuance of municipal bonds
- Providing (in accordance with law) benefits from local taxes and fees
- Exclusions from the law of public property, approval of local privatization programs and a list of public utilities not subject to privatization
- Placement of new facilities, considering the scope of environmental impact in accordance with current regulations
- Territorial structure
- Laws on land use, ensuring the quality of life
- Creation of special free and other areas and changes in their status, on the initiative of the President or the Cabinet of Ministers of Ukraine

The powers of executive bodies of village, township and city councils are autonomous or delegated. Delegated powers include:

- Monitoring compliance with land and environmental legislation, land use and protection of natural resources at the national and local levels; reforestation
- Registration of land ownership, land-use lease contracts documenting ownership and right to use land
- Disaster relief in accordance with law; public notification
- Defining territory for warehousing, storage or placement of industrial, household and other waste in accordance with law
- Organization and implementation of land-management projects
- Preparation and submission of targeted local programs to improve safety, working conditions and the environment, territorial employment programs and protection of different population groups from unemployment
- Implementation of measures to improve housing and welfare for the disabled, war veterans, victims of political repression, military and former military personnel, families who lost breadwinners, the elderly and children without parental care
- Granting benefits and assistance for the protection of motherhood and childhood; enforcing legislation on guardianship and custody
- Representation of citizens who suffered from natural disasters
- Compensation and benefits to citizens affected by the Chernobyl disaster, as stipulated by law
- Monitoring of safety for employees in hazardous and dangerous jobs, providing employees benefits and compensation for work in hazardous conditions
- Provision for free education and health services for all, training opportunities in public schools and in their native language, study of their native language in state educational establishments and through national cultural societies
- Provision for education and health services, developing and improving the network of educational and medical institutions, physical culture and sport, identifying needs and contracting for training specialists to ensure conformity to legislation governing medicinal products and medical supplies
- Preventing child neglect
- Support of orphans and children left without parental care in boarding schools and orphanages, vocational education and maintenance by the state of those with defects in physical or mental development who cannot study in ordinary schools (special education)
- Protection of historical and cultural monuments, conservation and cultural heritage
- Promotion of military and alternative (civilian) service, mobilization, preparing young people for service in the Armed Forces of Ukraine
- Organization and participation in activities related to civil defense
- Upholding legislative requirements regarding applications, regardless of ownership
- Upholding laws on the conduct of meetings, protests and demonstrations, sports, entertainment and other events
- Crime prevention
- Civil registration

== Finances ==
The financial basis of local government consists of movable and immovable property, revenues, other funds, land, natural resources and common property, and is managed by district and regional councils. Territorial communities of villages, towns and cities may unite (on a contractual basis) objects of communal property and budget funds for implementation of joint projects, or to jointly finance (or maintain) communal enterprises, organizations and institutions. The state participates in the revenue of local budgets, financially supporting local self-government. Costs to local government arising from decisions of public authorities are compensated by the state.

Local governments can be legally-separate powers of the executive. The state finances the exercise of these powers in full from the state budget of Ukraine, or (by referring to the local budget, in the manner prescribed by law, certain national taxes) transfers to local governments appropriate objects of state property. Activities of local authorities aim to meet the social needs of citizens and (especially) to obtain essential services. Local budgets are the financial base of local governments; the resources accumulated in these budgets determine how effectively local authorities can carry out their mandate.

== Elections ==
Under the Constitution of Ukraine, the term of office of the heads of villages and towns and the council members of these villages and towns is five years. (Note: In the 2010 Ukrainian local elections four years was set for the office of the heads of villages and towns and the council members of these villages and towns.) The last nationwide local election was held in 2020. Holding a local snap election will not cancel the next (originally scheduled for October 2025, suspended indefinitely due to the Russo-Ukrainian War) regular election in the place where the snap election will be held.

Ukrainian citizens who belong to the relevant local community and are entitled to vote may do so in national (or Crimean), regional, district, urban district or local elections and fully participate in political life (including election campaigns and observing elections), as determined by the laws of Ukraine.

Composition of village, settlement, city, urban district, district and regional councils should be:

- Under 1,000 population: 12–15 members
- 1,000–3,000: 16–26 members
- 3,000–5,000: 20–30 members
- 5,000–20,000: 30–36 members
- 20,000–50,000: 30–46 members
- 50,000–100,000: 36–50 members
- 100,000–250,000: 40–60 members
- 250,000–500,000: 50–76 members
- 500,000–1,000,000: 60–90 members
- 1,000,000–2,000,000: 76–120 members
- Over 2,000,000: 76–150 members

The right to nominate candidates is implemented through local voters of the parties (blocks) or by self, as provided by law.

In the relatively free local elections in Ukraine's recent history are the local elections of 1990, when Ukraine was still a part of the Soviet Union.

== Examples ==
Regional and district councils are local authorities which represent the common interests of villages and towns within the powers specified in the Constitution of Ukraine, other laws and powers transferred to them by rural, town and city councils. At plenary sessions of the district and regional councils, the following issues are decided:

- Holding a referendum on issues affecting their common interests
- Holding national referendums and national and local elections
- Approval of socioeconomic and cultural development of the region, and hearing reports on their implementation
- Approval of district and regional budgets and their amendments
- Monitoring state-budget allocations
- Management of common property
- Administrative and territorial structure, within the procedure established by law
- Electing (and dismissing) a chairman and deputy chairman
- Approval of executive-council staff

The District Chairman is elected from among its members during the term of the council by secret ballot, and serves until a new chairman is elected. The chairman is accountable to the council; they may be dismissed from office by a two-thirds majority of the council in a secret ballot. Regional and district councils do not form their own executive bodies, since appropriate powers delegated by their regional and district state administrations.

The organizational, legal, informational, analytical and logistical activities of the council and its agencies provide staff for council members. It contributes interaction and relationships with local communities, local authorities, bodies and officials of local governments. The ex officio chairman heads the council.

Executive power in oblasts, districts and the cities of Kyiv and Sevastopol is exercised by local administrations. The organization, powers and procedures of local public administrations is defined by the Law of Ukraine "On local state administrations" of 9 April 1999 № 586-XIV. The exercise of executive power in Kyiv and Sevastopol are determined by special laws. The composition of local state administrations is formed by the head of local state administrations, who are appointed and dismissed by the President of Ukraine upon submission to the Cabinet of Ministers.

State administrations ensure:

- Implementation of the Constitution and laws of Ukraine, acts of the President of Ukraine, Cabinet of Ministers of Ukraine and other bodies of executive power
- Law and order, the rights and freedoms of citizens
- National and regional socioeconomic and cultural development, environmental protection programs and (in areas with indigenous peoples and national minorities) programs for national and cultural development
- Preparation and implementation of regional and district budgets
- Report on the implementation of budgets and programs
- Cooperation with local governments
- Cooperation with other states and their respective councils

The heads of local state administrations are accountable to the President of Ukraine and the Cabinet of Ministers of Ukraine. As part of the authority delegated to them by the relevant district or regional councils, local state administrations are accountable to and controlled by councils. Decisions by heads of local state administrations that contravene the Constitution and laws of Ukraine or other legislative acts of Ukraine may be revoked according to law by the President of Ukraine or a head of higher-level local administration. Regional or district councils may adopt a motion of no confidence in the head of the respective local state administration until the President of Ukraine takes decision and makes a reasoned response. If no confidence in the head of a district or regional state administration is expressed by two-thirds of the deputies to a council, the president of Ukraine decides whether or not to accept their resignation.

Election of members of district councils are by the proportional system: deputies elected from the electoral lists of political parties (or electoral blocs of political parties in the larger constituency). Election of deputies to regional councils and Kyiv and Sevastopol also use the proportional system.

== Crimea ==
The representative body of the Autonomous Republic of Crimea (ARC) is the Supreme Council. Parliament within its authority adopts decisions and resolutions which are binding in the ARC. The government of the ARC is the Council of Ministers. The chairman of the Council of Ministers is appointed and dismissed by the Verkhovna Rada of the ARC with the consent of the President of Ukraine. The powers, procedure and activities of the Supreme Council and the Council of Ministers are determined by the constitution and laws of Ukraine and legal acts of the Verkhovna Rada of the ARC.

The ARC regulates:

- Agriculture and forestry
- Reclamation and mining
- Public works, crafts, trades and charity
- Urban development and housing
- Tourism, hotel business and fairs
- Museums, libraries, theaters and other cultural institutions; historic and cultural reserves
- Public transportation, roads and water supply
- Hunting and fishing
- Health and hospital services

Political activity regulated by the ARC includes:

- Election of deputies to the Verkhovna Rada of the ARC and the approval of the election commission
- Organizing and conducting local referendums
- Managing property belonging to the ARC
- Development, approval and execution of the ARC on the basis of the uniform tax and budget policy of Ukraine
- Development, approval and implementation of ARC programs for socioeconomic and cultural development of environmental management and protection (according to national programs)
- Recognition of the status of localities as resorts; establishment of resort sanitary-protection zones
- Ensuring the rights and freedoms of citizens and national harmony; promotion of order and public security
- Maintenance and development of state and national languages and cultures in the ARC; protection and use of historical monuments
- Participation in the development and implementation of state programs for the return of deported peoples
- Initiating a state of emergency and establishing zones of emergency in the ARC

The laws of the ARC can also be delegated to the president of the Ukrainian delegation, whose status is determined by the law of Ukraine.

To ensure the implementation of common socioeconomic and cultural programs of local communities, the budgets of the ARC and the oblasts are derived from the following payments:

- A 25-percent tax on personal income, paid in compliance with the Law of Ukraine "On income tax individuals on their respective territory"
- A 25-percent tax on rents, paid in compliance with the Law of Ukraine "On income tax of individuals in the territory of the Autonomous Republic of Crimea and the corresponding region"
- Fees for licenses to conduct certain types of business and certificates issued by the Council of Ministers of the ARC and regional state administrations

To ensure the implementation of common socioeconomic and cultural programs of local communities, district budgets are taken into account when determining the scope of intergovernmental transfers:

- A 50-percent tax on personal income, transferred in compliance with the Law of Ukraine "On income tax of individuals" in villages, cities of regional importance and their associations
- 15 percent of payments for land, paid in villages, cities of regional importance and their associations
- Fees for licenses to conduct certain types of business and certificates issued by district administrations
- Payment for state registration of business entities, transferred in compliance with the Law of Ukraine "On income tax of individuals" to district administrations
- Administrative fines imposed by district administrations

In addition, a base of regional and districts of the ARC is formed from transfers from the state budget and other government agencies.

== See also ==
- Geography of Ukraine
- Administrative divisions of Ukraine
