= Zaporizhzhia Raion =

Subdivision of Zaporizhzhia Oblast, Ukraine

Zaporizhzhia Raion Запорізький район
- Raion
- Zaporizkyi raion
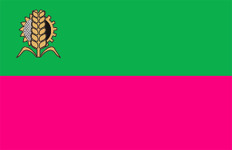
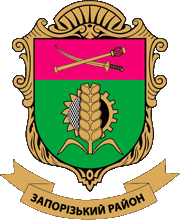
- Flag Coat of arms
- Interactive map of Zaporizhzhia Raion
- Coordinates: 47°44′23.14″N 35°1′34.06″E
- Country: Ukraine
- Oblast: Zaporizhzhia Oblast
- Established: 11 February 1939
- Admin. center: Zaporizhzhia
- Subdivisions: 17 hromadas

Government
  - Governor: Serhiy Semerenko
  - Chairman: Oleksandr Polunin

Area
  - Total: 4,674.61 km^{2} (1,804.88 sq mi)

Population (2022)
  - Total: 840,866
  - Density: 179.879/km^{2} (465.885/sq mi)
- Time zone: UTC+02:00 (EET)
  - Summer (DST): UTC+03:00 (EEST)
- Postal index: 70401–70454
- Area code: +380 61
- Website: zrda.gov.ua

Zaporizhzhia Raion (Ukrainian: Запорізький район, romanized: Zaporiz'kyj rajon) is one of the five raions (districts) of Zaporizhzhia Oblast in southeast Ukraine. Its administrative center is Zaporizhzhia. Population: 840,866 (2022 estimate).

On 18 July 2020, as part of the administrative reform of Ukraine, the number of raions of Zaporizhzhia Oblast was reduced to five, and the area of Zaporizhzhia Raion was significantly expanded. According to the 2001 census, its population was 54,804. The January 2020 estimate of the raion population was 56,364 (2020 est.).

== Geography ==
Zaporizhzhia Raion is located in the northeast portion of Zaporizhzhia Oblast, surrounding the oblast's administrative center Zaporizhzhia. Its total area constitutes 1,462.02 km^{2} (564.49 mi^{2}). The Dnieper and Konka rivers flow through the raion.

== History ==
The territory which is now the Zaporizhzhia Raion was first established as the Voznesenskyi Raion (Ukrainian: Вознесенський район) on 7 March 1923 as part of a full-scale administrative reorganization of the Ukrainian Soviet Socialist Republic.

In 1926, it was renamed to the Khortytsia Raion (Ukrainian: Хортицький район). From 1929 to 1930, it was named the Khortytsia German Raion (Ukrainian: Хортицький німецький район). On 11 February 1939, the Zaporizhzhia Raion itself was created.

After World War II, the raion was disestablished, only to be recreated again on 14 January 1965.

== Government ==
Zaporizhzhia Raion is governed by the Zaporizhzhia Raion Council (Ukrainian: Запорізька районна рада, Zaporiz'ka raionna rada), which consists of 38 locally elected deputies. The raion is represented by the 82nd electoral district in Ukraine's parliament; its current MP is Maryna Nikitina of the Servant of the People party.

== Administrative divisions ==
Zaporizhzhia Raion is divided in a way that follows the general administrative scheme in Ukraine. Local government is also organized along a similar scheme nationwide. Consequently, raions are subdivided into councils, which are the prime level of administrative division in the country.

Each of the raion's urban populated places administer their own councils, often containing a few villages and rural settlements within its jurisdiction. However, only a handful of rural populated places are organized into councils, which also may contain a few villages and rural settlements within its jurisdiction.

Accordingly, Zaporizhzhia Raion is divided into:

- 3 settlement councils—made up of the urban-type settlements of Balabyne, Kushuhum, and Malokaterynivka
- 16 rural councils

Overall, the raion has a total of 71 populated places, consisting of three settlements, 61 villages, and seven rural settlements.

== Demographics ==
In the 2001 Ukrainian census, the raion's total population was 54,804. The percentage of the population which indicated Ukrainian as their native language constituted 50.2 percent, compared to 48.19% for the Russian language.
