= Shahed drones =

Iranian unmanned aerial combat vehicles

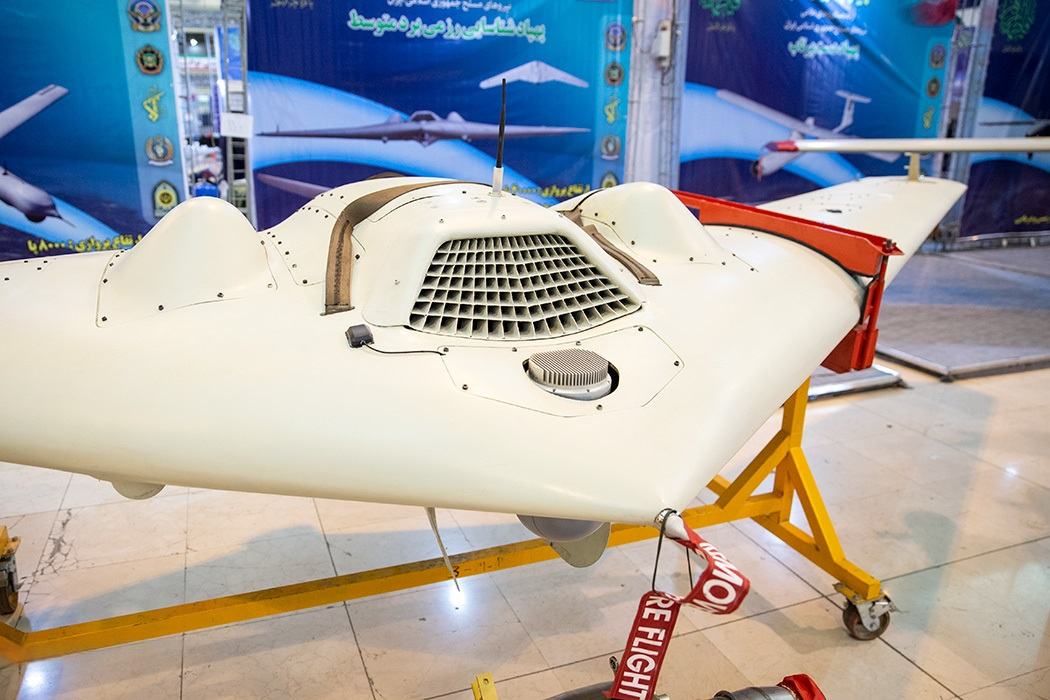
A Shahed Saeqeh-2 variant

Shahed drones are Iranian unmanned combat aerial vehicles (UCAVs) and loitering munitions developed by Shahed Aviation Industries. Shahed drones are manufactured both in Iran and in Russia, with the Russian variant building upon Iranian plans. Following the 2022 Russian invasion of Ukraine, both variants have been deployed by Russian forces against Ukraine during the Russo-Ukrainian war and by Iranian forces during the 2026 Iran war.

== Development and production ==
=== Name ===
"Shahed" (شاهد, transliterations: Persian: Šâhed, Arabic: Šāhid) literally means "witness" in both Persian and Arabic languages.

=== Iran ===
The Shahed drones are developed by Shahed Aviation Industries. They are produced using domestic companies and local resources. Despite international sanctions against Iran, there are claims that components for the drones include commercial parts made by companies headquartered in the United States, Switzerland, the Netherlands, Germany, Canada, Japan, and Poland. Due to their commercial availability, the components are poorly regulated or uncontrolled, and according to a Ukrainian report submitted to the G7, the parts are imported to Iran from Turkey, India, Kazakhstan, Uzbekistan, Vietnam and Costa Rica. Allegedly, every drone factory in Iran has two replacement sites to ensure production is not disrupted in the event of an aerial attack.

On 5 December 2011, the Iranian government seized an American Lockheed Martin RQ-170 Sentinel UAV, which had been commandeered and brought down by Iran's cyberwarfare unit. Shahed Aviation Industries then reverse-engineered the American UAV, and used the acquired knowledge to develop the Shahed 171 Simorgh and Shahed 191 Saeqeh.

=== Russia ===
During the seventy-eighth session of the United Nations General Assembly in September 2023, the United States accused Iran of supplying Russia with drones during the Russian invasion of Ukraine, and aiding Russia in the development of a drone production plant. Iranian president Ebrahim Raisi denied the allegations, responding, "We are against the war in Ukraine." Months earlier, Sky News received purported document evidence dated 14 September 2022 from an informed source that Russia had purchased over US$1 million of artillery and tank shells and rockets. In June 2023, a U.S. intelligence finding released by the White House reported Iran was supplying Russia with materials to construct a drone manufacturing plant. In February 2024, additional document evidence was leaked revealing Russia's purchases of drones and an arrangement for Iran to assist Russia in developing a manufacturing facility, both purchased for a total of US$1.75 billion, paid in gold ingots.

According to the document submitted to the G7, the Iranian government is trying to "disassociate itself from providing Russia with weapons" and that "[it] cannot cope with Russian demand and the intensity of use in Ukraine." Consequently, the Yelabuga drone factory was established with Iranian assistance in Alabuga Special Economic Zone, part of the Republic of Tatarstan, an autonomous region of Russia, more than 1,300 km (810 mi) from the Russia–Ukraine border. The manufactory is next to the Kama River, permitting transportation by ship directly from Iran via the Caspian Sea, and is operated by the company Albatross, which employs students as young as 15 years old from Alabuga Polytechnic College to construct the combat drones. Russia aims to build 6,000 UCAVs by summer 2025 at a rate of 310 drones per month if the factory operates 24 hours a day, predicting the cost of production of one Geran-2 to be US$48,000. However, Russia has upgraded the drones over several iterations and has consequently increased the unit production cost to around US$80,000 as of April 2024.

Iranian drone technology was deployed in combat during the Russian invasion of Ukraine. Russia used Iranian Shahed 136 drones in an attack on Kyiv on 17 October 2022, during which four civilians were killed, including one woman who was six months pregnant. Another Russian attack using Iranian drones took place on 28 May 2023. Ukraine said it shot down all but one of the drones, but one person was killed. Another strike on 20 June used 35 Shahed drones, 32 of which were claimed to have been shot down by Ukraine. On 22 November 2024, Russia attacked a residential area in Sumy, Ukraine, using Shahed drones. Two civilians were killed in the attack and 12 were injured. On 17 May 2025, Russia conducted multiple attacks across Ukraine involving Shahed drones, killing at least 13 civilians and injuring 32.

In July 2025, there were multiple reports, including a documentary by Russian defense ministry channel Zvezda, indicating that Russia was using children and teenagers to assemble Shahed drones used to attack Ukraine.

==== Coercion of foreigners for labour ====
In 2025, open-source investigations and multiple investigative reports found that young women across Africa were being coerced into traveling to the Alabuga Special Economic Zone in Russia where they were promised hospitality work or scholarships, but instead are used to assemble Shahed drones, facing danger in harsh conditions as the area is targeted by Ukrainian air strikes. In November 2025, South Africa opened an investigation and issued a warning to its citizens after Russia was accused of making the false promises.

The Wall Street Journal reported officials from Uganda saying that more than 1,000 women across Africa had been lured to Alabuga under false pretenses.

== List of models ==
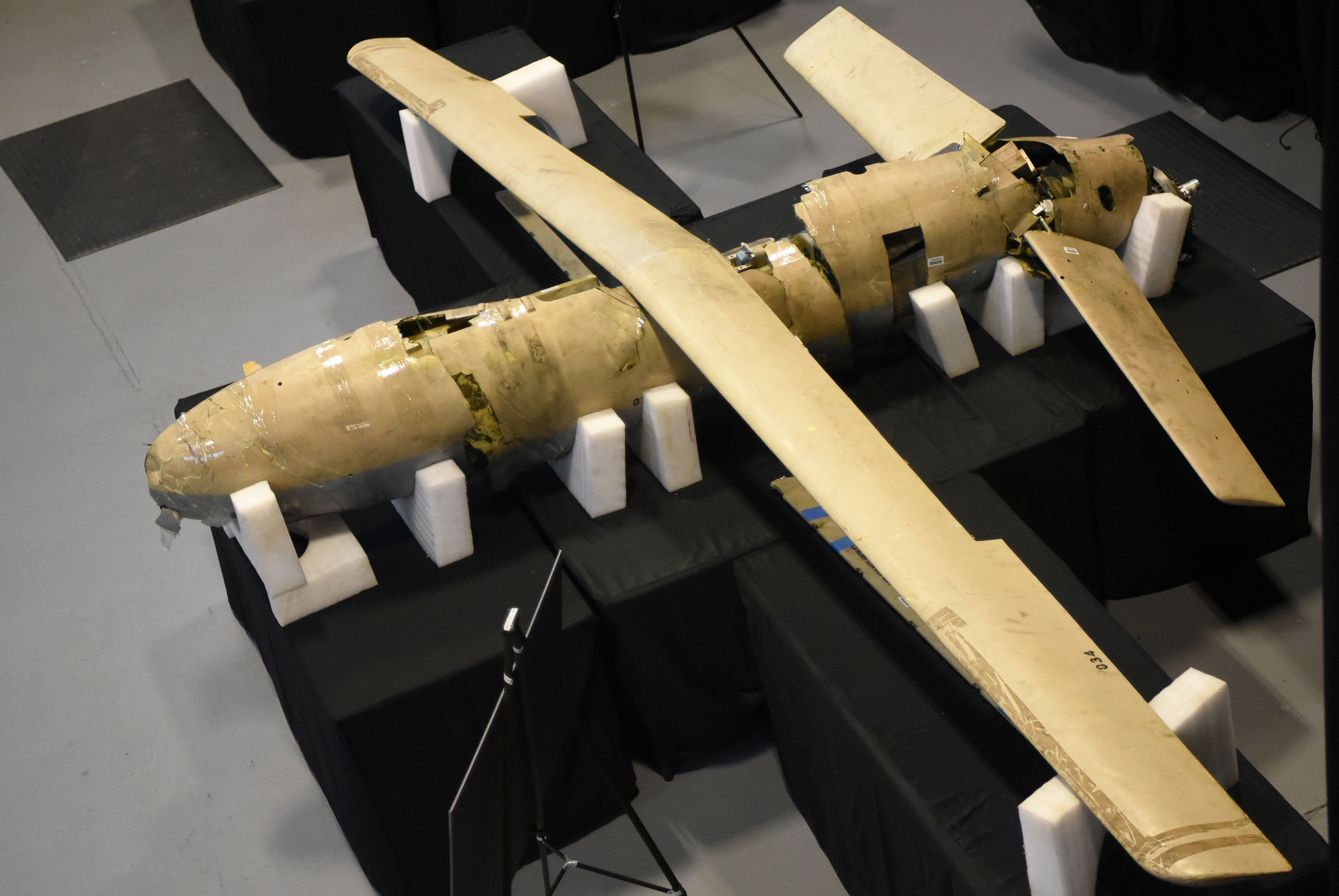
Remains of a Shahed 123

Known models include: (Note: Based on the following sources: Frantzman, Seth J. (8 June 2020). "Inside Iran's massive drone army". www.jpost.com. The Jerusalem Post.; "Iran Officially Unveils Shahed-238". www.mil.in.ua. Militarnyi. 20 November 2023.; Haynes, Deborah. "'Explosive' new attack drone developed by Iran for Russia's war in Ukraine". Sky News.; Roblin, Sebastien (14 September 2021). "Your Guide to Iran's Diverse Fleet of Combat Drones". The National Interest. "This was followed by actual Shahed 191 flying wing stealth drones, the piston-engine Saegheh-1, and jet-powered Saegheh-2.")

- Shahed 101
- Shahed 107
- Shahed 121
- Shahed 123
- Shahed 125
- Shahed 129
- Shahed 131 (also called "Geran-1" in Russian service)
- Shahed 133
- HESA Shahed 136 (also called "Geran-2" in Russian service)
- Shahed 139
- Shahed 141
- Shahed 147
- Shahed 149 Gaza
- Shahed 161
- Shahed 171 Simorgh
- Shahed 178
- Shahed 191 (also called "Shahed Saegheh"), with two variants:
  - Shahed Saegheh-1
  - Shahed Saegheh-2
- Shahed 197
- Shahed 238

== Shahed 107 ==
The Shahed 107 was revealed to Sky News by an anonymous security source in January 2024. It was described as a loitering munition with possible reconnaissance technologies, such as a live video feed. The source also reported it is about 2.5 m (8 ft 2 in) long and has a wingspan of 3 m (9.8 ft). The UCAV can be launched from a vehicle and is estimated to have a range of up to 1,500 km (930 mi). The source also told Sky News that Iran had offered "a few units" to Russia in a deal worth more than US$2 million.

== Shahed 121 ==
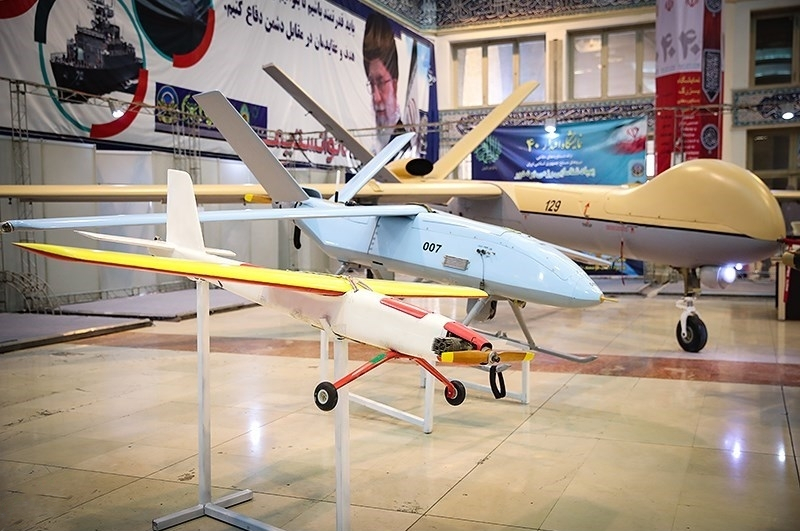
Shahed 121 in blue, and to the right, a Shahed 129 with redesigned radome

The Shahed 121 was first noticed in 2016 when it flew over USS Harry S. Truman, a nuclear-powered aircraft carrier, in international airspace. The US Navy regarded this as a security breach which had not happened since 2014. The incident occurred after a nuclear deal that Iran signed with world powers, including the US. A US Navy Seahawk helicopter filmed the incident. The flight of Shahed 121 was considered by Iranian authorities to be safe as its wings were all "clean", implying that the drone did not carry weapons and was not dangerous to ships, but the high command of the US Navy described it as "abnormal" and "unprofessional."

== Shahed 129 ==
The Shahed 129, sometimes S129, is an Iranian single-engine medium-altitude long-endurance UCAV designed for the Islamic Revolutionary Guard Corps. It is capable of combat and reconnaissance missions. It has an endurance of 24 hours; it is similar in size, shape, and role to the American MQ-1 Predator. The Shahed 129 has been used for airstrikes in the Syrian Civil War and for border patrol on Iran's eastern border. As of 2017, the Shahed 129 and Shahed Saeqeh are expected to form the backbone of Iran's high-end UAV fleet for at least the next decade.

== Shahed 131 (Geran-1) ==
The Shahed 131, also called Geran-1 (Russian: Герань-1, literally "Geranium-1") in Russian service, came to prominence in October 2022 during the Russo-Ukrainian war. It is powered by a Wankel engine model Shahed-783/788. The Shahed-131 flight control unit was found to be able to connect with Iridium satellites, which in theory allows the flight path to be altered mid-flight. The flight controller has a backup inertial navigation system by MEMS gyroscope. Its primary instructions are derived from a commercial-grade GPS unit.

The Shahed 131 is visually distinguished by vertical stabilisers that extend only upwards from the ends of the wings, while on the larger Shahed 136 they extend both up and down. It has a 15 kg (33 lb) warhead and has a range of 900 km (559 mi).

== HESA Shahed 136 (Geran-2) ==
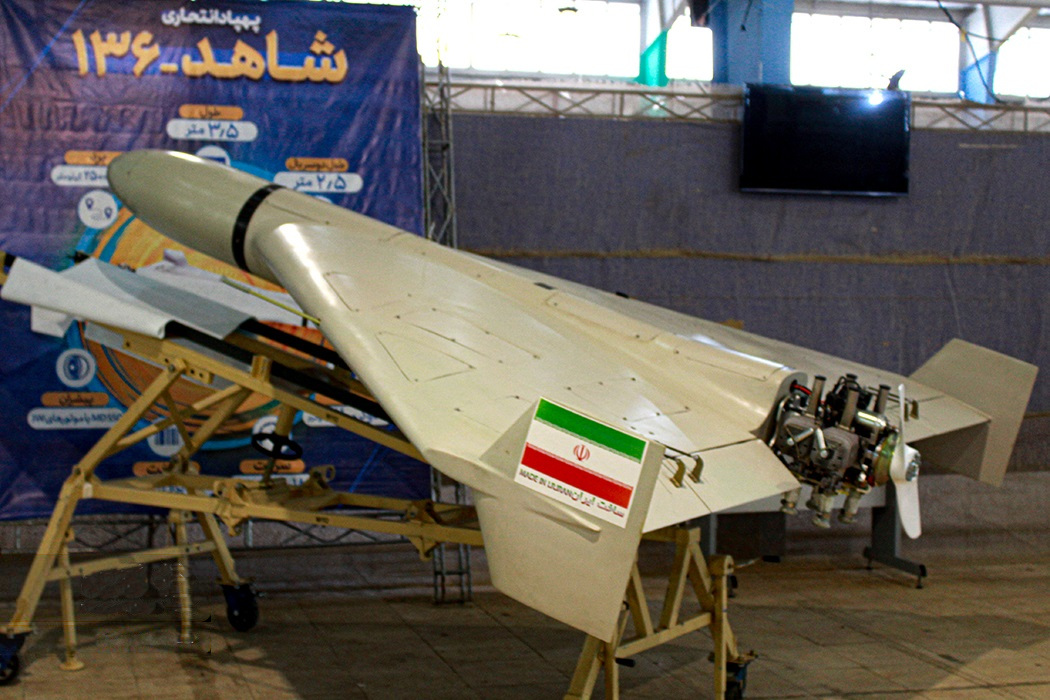
Shahed 136 side view

The HESA Shahed 136, or simply Shahed 136, known also as the Geran-2 (Russian: Герань-2) in Russian service, is a loitering munition in the form of an autonomous pusher-prop UCAV. It is designed and manufactured by Iran Aircraft Manufacturing Industrial Company, or HESA, in association with Shahed Aviation Industries. Its first appearance was 13 September 2022, when photos of the remains of a drone used by Russian forces during the invasion of Ukraine were publicly released. The wings were inscribed with "M412 Герань-2" ("M412 Geran-2" in Russian) as a means of disguising the drone and concealing Iran's part in the invasion of Ukraine, but it was recognized by its wing design, and Geran-2 drones are considered by Ukraine and its Western allies to be redesignated Iranian-made Shahed 136 drones. Experts have estimated a Shahed 136 costs between US$20,000 to US$50,000 to make. A series of leaked emails and documents revealed Russia had purchased 6,000 Shahed 136s for US$193,000 each in 2023. Russia is reported to be manufacturing a version of the Shahed 136, and Ukraine was also planning to produce its own version.

The drones were used in the October 2022 missile strikes on Kyiv.

== Shahed 147 ==
The Shahed 147 is a twin-boom, high-altitude long-endurance (HALE) surveillance UAV powered by a turboprop engine. It possesses a wingspan of 26 m (85 ft) and a maximum flight altitude of 60,000 feet (18,288 metres). The drone also possesses Synthetic Aperture Radar imaging for surveillance. The Shahed 147 was revealed during the 19 November 2023 Iranian Aerospace Force Exhibition, attended by Iranian Supreme Leader Ali Khamenei.

== Shahed 149 Gaza ==
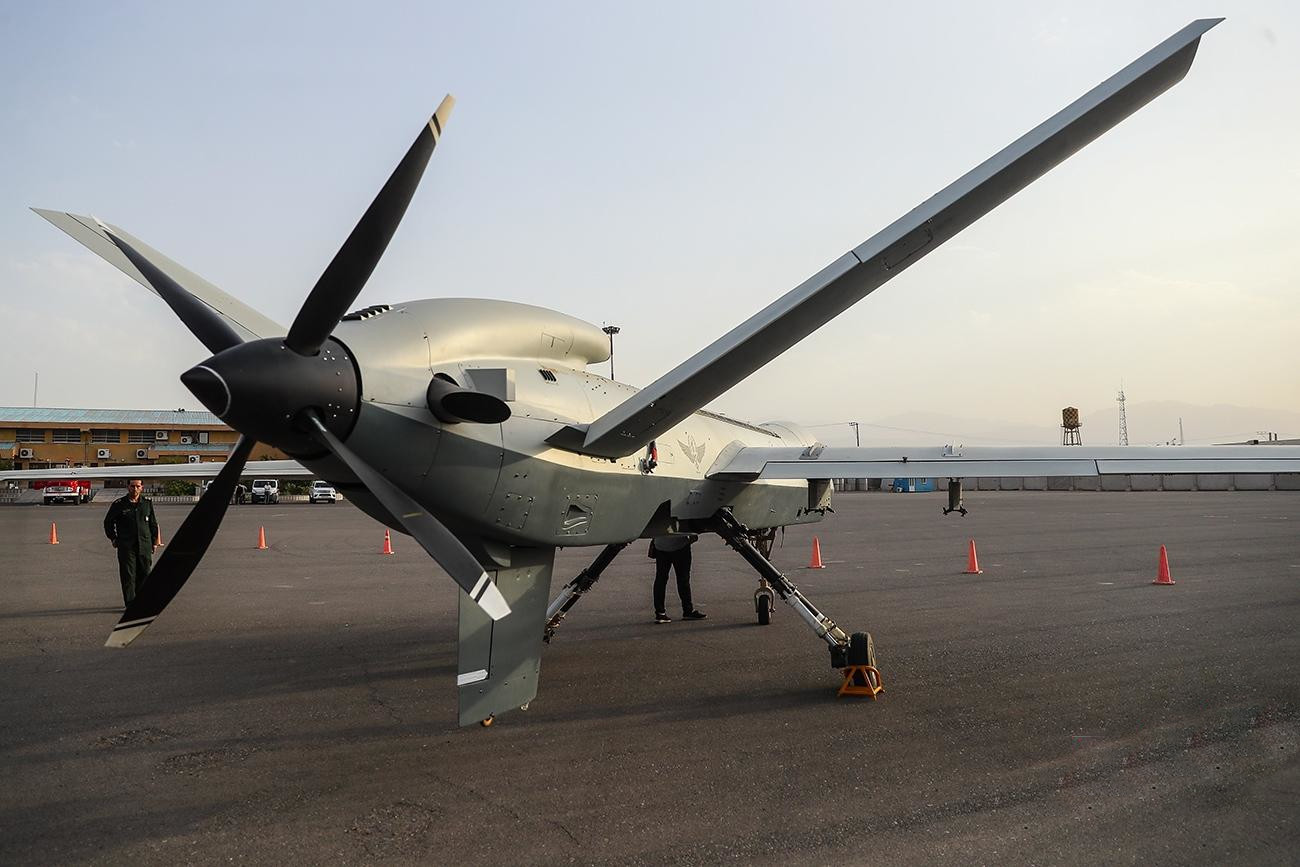
Rear view of a Shahed 149 Gaza

The Shahed 149 Gaza was unveiled on 21 May 2021 and named after the Gaza Strip in honor of Palestinians' struggle amid the 2021 Israel–Palestine crisis. The drone is a high-altitude, long-endurance UAV similar in size, shape and role to the American MQ-9 Reaper. It is larger and heavier than the earlier Shahed 129. It has a flight duration of 24 hours, a maximum operating radius of 2,500 km (1,600 mi), 21 m (69 ft) wingspan, 340 km/h (210 mph) maximum speed and is capable of carrying 13 bombs and 500 kg (1,100 lb) of electronic equipment. It was the first Iranian UAV powered by a turboprop engine.

== Shahed 171 Simorgh ==
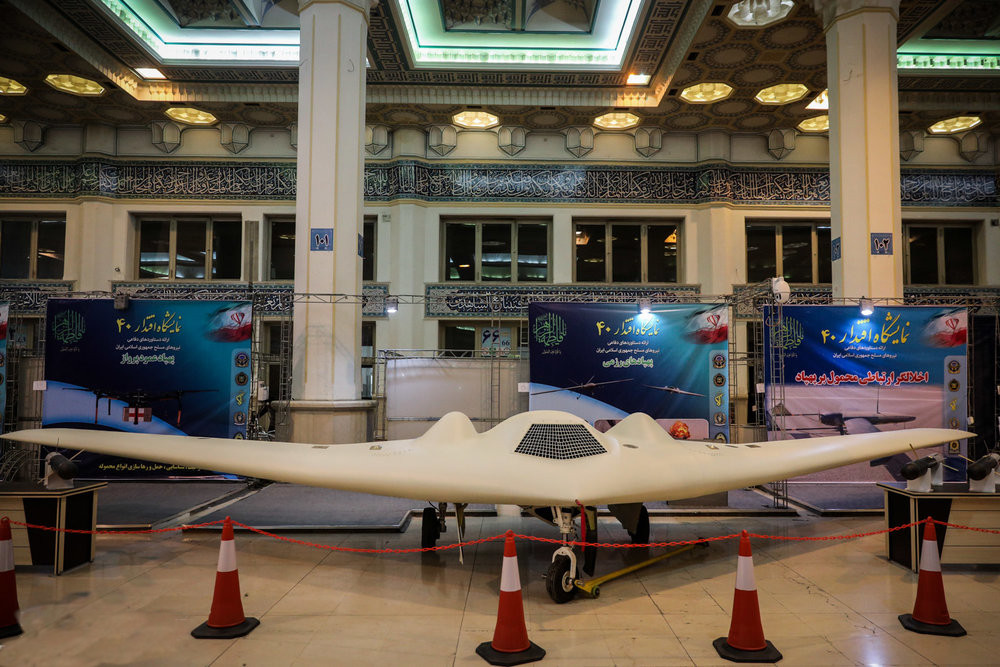
Shahed 171 Simorgh

The Shahed 171 Simorgh, named after a benevolent bird of Persian mythology, and called IRN-170 by the US government, is a jet-powered flying wing UCAV. It is based on an American Lockheed Martin RQ-170 Sentinel UAV that was seized by Iran in 2011 and reverse-engineered.

== Shahed 191 (Shahed Saeqeh) ==
The Shahed 191, also called the Shahed Saeqeh, sometimes spelled "Saeqeh," was first revealed at an Iranian arms expo in October 2016. The name comes from the Persian word for "thunderbolt." Like the Shahed 171 Simorgh, the Shahed 191 is based on the seized Lockheed Martin RQ-170 Sentinel. The Shahed 191 has two variants, the Saeqeh-1 and the Saeqeh-2.

=== Saeqeh-1 ===
The Saeqeh-1 is a flying wing UCAV powered by a turbofan and piston-engine. The drone can carry two Sadid-1 missiles externally, a combined payload weight of 50 kg (110 lb).

=== Saeqeh-2 ===
The Saeqeh-2 is a jet-powered flying wing UCAV launched from a moving car. It can reportedly fly at a cruising speed of 300 km/h (190 mph) for just over 4.5 hours, and can travel a distance of at least 450 km (280 mi). The Saeqeh-2 can carry two Sadid-1 missiles internally.

== Shahed 238 ==
The Shahed 238 is a turbojet-powered one-way attack drone. In September 2023, a trailer for an Iranian state TV documentary on Iranian drone development revealed a new version of Shahed 136 powered by a jet engine. The new drone was publicly unveiled in November 2023 during an aerospace achievement exhibition organized by the Islamic Revolutionary Guard Corps, which was attended by Iranian Supreme Leader Ali Khamenei. Three variants were displayed in a black color scheme, though whether this is a radar-absorbent material or simply a paint scheme for night operations is unknown.

A Russian Major General claimed in an interview with Russian agency Sputnik that the Shahed 238 would be a new version of the Geran-2, and that it would be capable of travelling at top speeds of 800 km/h (500 mph) during a dive. Iran, however, claims it can reach considerably lower top speeds of only 500 km/h (310 mph), powered by the Toloue-10 or Toloue-13 micro-turbojet 896 engine. Due to the new engine, compared to the HESA Shahed 136, there is less space available for fuel, presumably resulting in a reduced flight range and payload size.

The three Shahed 238 variants each had different guidance systems: one with basic GPS and GLONASS-based inertial navigation systems, as used in the Shahed 136, to hit fixed targets; electro-optical and infrared camera sensors for heat-seeking, with some reports suggesting the munitions could be directed by an operator using the video feed; and a radar-detection system to attack air defenses and other radars, allowing it to be used for Suppression of Enemy Air Defenses.

=== Operational history ===
In early January 2024, evidence emerged to suggest Russia had launched at least one Shahed 238 in an attack on Ukraine. Analysis of a destroyed model found several western components, such as a Czech PBS TJ150 turbojet engine, electronic chips from US manufacturers Intel and Texas Instruments, and satellite navigation antennas from Tallysman Wireless, indicating that Iran has found a means to bypass international sanctions. The Czech engine manufacturer denied these allegations, emphasizing that the engines used in Iranian drones are not their products, as confirmed by a 2020 UN panel of experts. The company highlighted that such claims are part of deliberate efforts to damage PBS's credibility, as it actively supplies engines for Ukraine's defense.

== Iran war ==
During the 2026 Iran war, Ukrainian president Volodymyr Zelenskyy stated that Ukraine had received an American request for assistance against Iranian Shahed drones. US President Donald Trump stated that he would accept Ukrainian assistance. According to the Ukrainian drone manufacturer Wild Hornets, the American media outlet Fox News aired footage of ″STING″ interceptor drones developed by the company, but presented it as showing American drones countering Iranian ones. Despite Trump's later public rejection of Zelenskyy's offer to assist in combatting Iranian drone strikes, the US sent Ukrainian counter-drone technology to the Prince Sultan Air Base after Iranian strikes caused damage and casualties during the war.

A US official said that a Shahed one-way attack drone downed a US helicopter during the war.

== Analysis ==
Interest in Iran's Shahed-series drones stems mainly from their affordability and extended operational range. Reuters reports that the Shahed-136 is much less expensive than traditional cruise missiles, creating a cost disadvantage when expensive air defense systems are used to counter them. Experts at the Center for Strategic and International Studies (CSIS) note that deploying large numbers of relatively low-cost drones can overwhelm or exhaust air defenses, thereby altering the financial dynamics of modern warfare. According to Ukrainian data, over 38,000 Iranian made Shahed drones were launched by Russia in 2025, including 5,000 in September alone. Shahed attacks on infrastructure and civilian areas have resulted in thousands of casualties in Ukraine. Through a billion-dollar weapons deal with Iran, Russia is aiming to domestically produce 6,000 drones. These are variants of the Shahed 136 drone, although customized. The supply of Iranian drones in addition to the targeted domestic weapons production with Iran's assistance indicates, according to scholars, that this strategic relationship will have implications beyond this specific Ukraine conflict.

=== Global impact ===
According to political scientist Mohammed Eslami, Iran's drone provisioning in Russia, for the purposes of usage in the Ukraine war, has strengthened Iran's role as a military power. This has especially been the case for putting Iran on the international stage as one of the world's big weapons suppliers. This has provided Iran with a source of income and geopolitical influence as an isolated country, providing a way for the country to find relief from financial restrictions imposed by the United States. The income from their Shahed drone support to Russia will assist with the development of new weapons and further pave the way for Iran to compete with other regional arms suppliers such as Turkey and Israel, on the international scale. Iran's low-cost Shahed drones have also created a global market for low-cost, high performing versatile drones that can be used in attritional combat scenarios. Shahed series drones appear to cost approximately US$20,000, whereas certain equipment such as air-to-air missiles or ground-based interceptors cost between US$400,000 to US$1.2 million each. Through the supplying of drones to Russia, Iran has also expanded its global market share, gaining credibility for its military technology, leading to an increased reputation on the global scene.

Prior to the 2022 Russian invasion of Ukraine, Iran's primary drone customers were various militias, including its militias. However, because of the Russo-Ukrainian war, Iran's drone supplying customers have shifted and expanded to include other nation-states like Russia, who purchase drones in larger supply. The Russian demand for large quantities of drones and loitering munitions has significantly expanded the Iranian market demand. The sophistication and dissemination of these drones in the global military marketplace, most notably seen in this Russian case, are theorized by scholars to go beyond this specific conflict and cause Western powers to begin developing low-cost anti-drone systems:

Just as with Western support for Ukraine, the Iranian drone build-up will have implications that go beyond this specific conflict. Iranian drones are increasing not only in number, but also sophistication and lethality, a development that concerns the United States and Europe. In response, we can expect Western actors to prioritise the production and export of low-cost defence systems able to counter the mass-produced drones directed by Iran, Iranian proxies, and other adversaries.

== See also ==
- Foreign involvement in the Russian invasion of Ukraine
- Iran and the Russian invasion of Ukraine
- Geran (weapons family)
- Low-cost Uncrewed Combat Attack System – a US system partially derived from the Shahed 136
