= Saegheh =

Iranian weapons systems

The Saegheh ("Lightning" or "Thunder" in Persian; also spelled Saegre, Saeghe, Saeqeh, etc.) is any of at least eight completely separate Iranian weapons systems: a rocket-propelled grenade (RPG) warhead, an anti-tank guided missile family, a surface-to-surface rocket, a target drone family, an air-to-air missile, a claimed stealth unmanned aerial vehicle, a fighter jet, and an anti-ship cruise missile.

== Saegheh ATGM ==
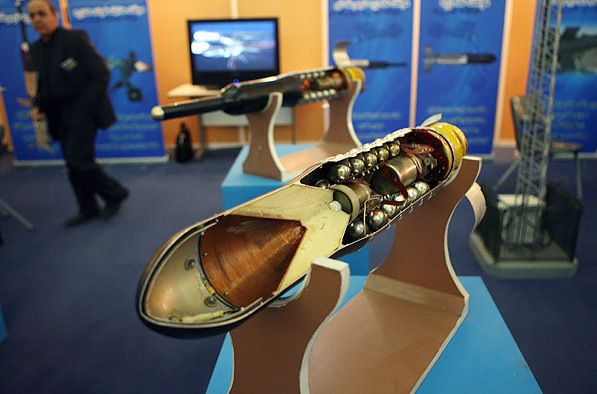
The Saeghe 1 ATGM (cutaway, front) and a Saeghe 2 ATGM (rear)

The first system, the Saeghe 1, is an Iranian reverse-engineered clone of the American M47 Dragon wire-guided SACLOS ATGM, introduced in 2001. It seems to have entered production in 2002. Iran later introduced the Saeghe 2, a more advanced variant with a tandem-warhead to defeat explosive reactive armor, and the Saeghe-4, with a thermobaric warhead. The Saeghe-1 weights 6.1 kilograms (13 lb) and can penetrate armor up to 500 millimetres (20 in). The 7.4-kilogram (16 lb) Saeghe 2 missile has a tandem warhead and can penetrate up to 760 millimetres (30 in) of armor. The Saeghe 1 & 4 65 to 1,000 metres (210 to 3,280 ft) and Saeghe 2 ATGMs have a range of 50 to 1,500 metres (160 to 4,920 ft).

Despite being essentially obsolete, Saegheh anti-tank guided missiles have been exported to Syria, Hezbollah, and Shia militias in Iraq. The Saeghe 1 and Saeghe 2 were in production and service as of 2011, though they were not widely deployed. The Saeghe ATGM is easy to aim thank to SACLOS IR wire-guided and in Iranian service it appears to be limited to IRGC and rapid response forces.

== Other Saegheh name designations ==
In 2006, Iran tested a completely unrelated short-range surface-to-surface missile that is also named Saegheh. It has a range of 80 to 250 kilometres (50 to 155 mi).

Under the Saegheh name, Iran has also built a variant warhead for RPG-7 style rocket launchers. Iran also uses the Saeghe name for a target drone (which comes in two variants: Saeghe 1 and Saeghe 2) and an air-to-air missile.

The semi-official Tasnim news agency of Iran reported in September 2016 that an unmanned aerial vehicle (UAV, drone) named Saegheh similar to the US RQ-170 Sentinel spy drone had been built. It was said to be able to carry four precision-guided bombs; range was not stated. An RQ-170 had been captured by Iran in 2011.

The Saegheh name is further reused for the HESA Saeqeh, a low production jet fighter, and for the Saeghe anti-ship cruise missile.

== Operators ==
- Iran
  - Islamic Revolutionary Guard Corps
  - Iranian Army
    - Ground Forces
- Syria
  - Syrian Arab Army
- Iraq
  - Popular Mobilization Units
- Lebanon
  - Hezbollah
