= Sadid-345 =

Iranian glide bomb

Sadid guided bomb
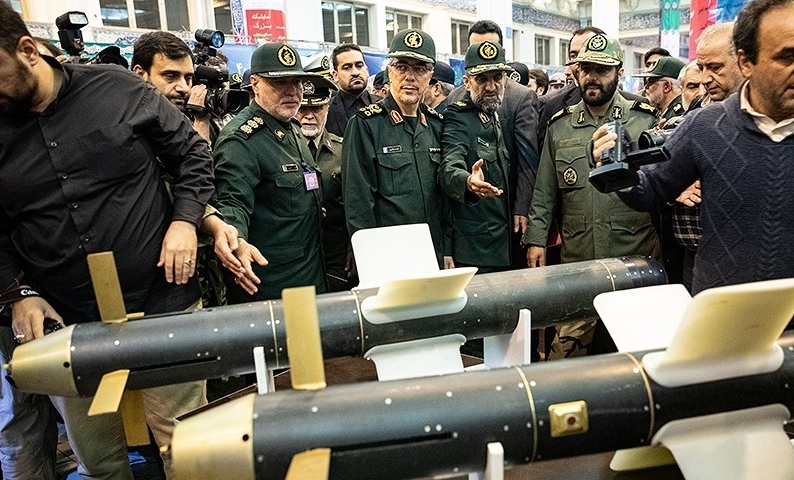
- Place of origin: Iran

Specifications
- Mass: 34 kg (75 lb)
- Length: 169 cm (67 in)
- Width: 152 mm (6.0 in)
- Effective firing range: 6 km

The Sadid-345, also known simply as the Sadid guided bomb is an Iranian precision-guided glide bomb with a fragmentation warhead.

The Sadid-345 is meant for use on UCAVs. Its main launch platform is the Shahed 129.

== Specifications ==
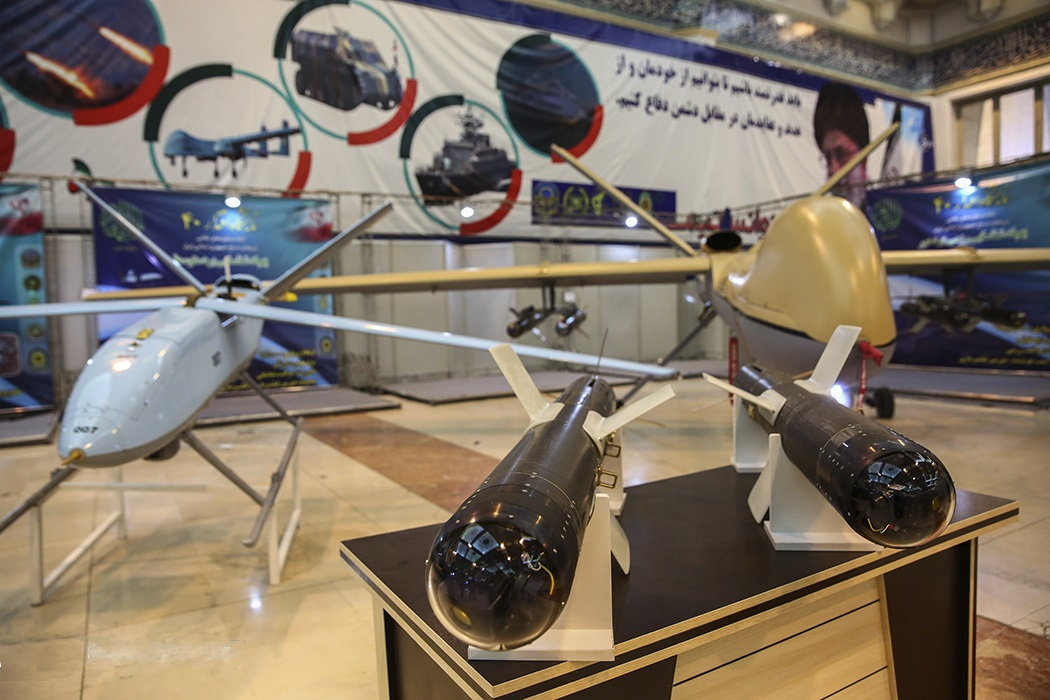
Two Sadid guided bombs in front of a Shahed 129 drone (right).

The bomb weighs 34 kg and is 1.63 meters long, with a diameter of 152 mm. It has four fixed fins on the body for lift and stability and four deflectable fins on the tail for trajectory control. The bomb has a range of 6 km and is made of composite material.

The Sadid-345 warhead is filled with composition H6 explosive and is prefragmented, with a specified lethal radius of 30 m. It is detonated by an impact fuse.

There is the possibility that Sadid-345 glide bombs could be developed with tandem-warheads, but as of the present there is no evidence of this.

The Sadid-345 can be equipped with an infrared seeker, with CEP of 2.5 m, a laser seeker with a CEP of 2.5 m, or a visual light seeker with a CEP of 5 m (though the CEP may be larger if there is difficulty with the image processing).

== Operational history ==
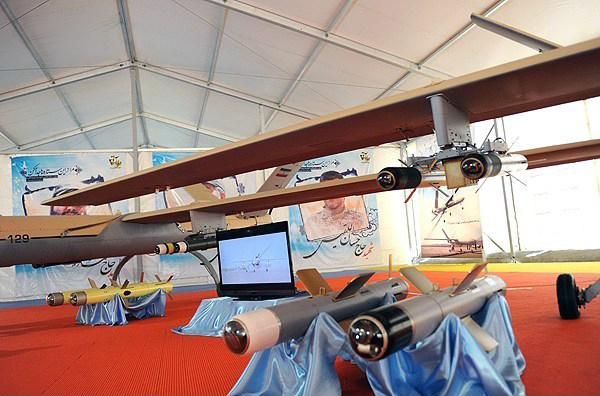
In the foreground are two Sadid-345 precision-guided munitions. Mounted on the wings and to the far left are the Sadid ATGMs.

=== Development ===
The Sadid-345 was developed after the intended armament for Iran's Shahed 129 UAV, the Sadid-1 ATGM, could not be successfully integrated for unclear reasons.

It is believed the Sadid-345 was developed from the Toophan through the removal of the engine, propulsion system, and wire guidance components.

=== Use ===
The IRGC is the only purchaser of the Sadid-345, as of 2018.

Shahed-129 UAVs have been used to deploy Sadid-345 munitions against Islamic State positions in Syria.

It can also be integrated on HESA Shahed 285 attack helicopters.

=== Launch platforms ===
- Shahed 129
- HESA Shahed 285
