= Shahed 139 =

Iranian unmanned aerial vehicle

General information
- Type: Unmanned aerial vehicle
- National origin: Iran
- Manufacturer: HESA
- Designer: Shahed Aviation Industries
- Status: Active

The Shahed 139 is an Iranian medium-altitude long-endurance (MALE) unmanned combat aerial vehicle (UCAV) developed by Shahed Aviation Industries. It is considered an upgraded variant of the earlier Shahed 129 drone.

== History ==
The Shahed 139 has been noted for its use in regional conflicts and has drawn international attention, such as when a U.S. Navy F-35C shot one down in the Arabian Sea near the USS Abraham Lincoln.

== Specifications ==
Sources: (based on MQ-1 Predator)

- Wingspan: Approximately 14.7 meters (48.2 feet)
- Length: Around 8.1 meters (26.7 feet)
- Height: About 2.9 meters (9.6 feet)
- Range: Estimated at up to 2,000 kilometers
- Service ceiling: Up to 5 kilometers

== See also ==
- Defense industry of Iran

Related lists

- List of military equipment manufactured in Iran
- List of unmanned aerial vehicles
