= Shahed 129 =

Iranian unmanned aerial vehicle

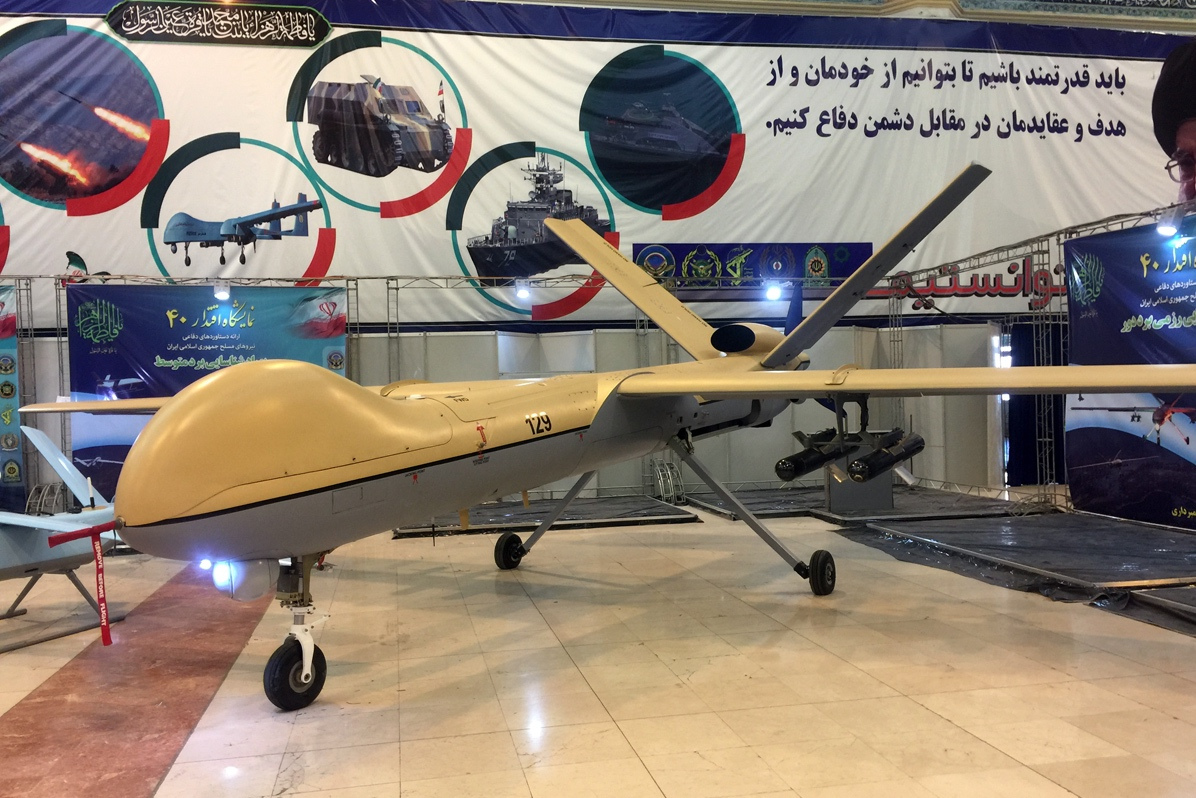
- The second generation Shahed 129.

General information
- Type: Combat / Intelligence / Surveillance / Reconnaissance (CISR)
- National origin: Iran
- Manufacturer: Iran Aircraft Manufacturing Industries Corporation (HESA)
- Designer: Shahed Aviation Industries Research Center
- Status: In service, in production
- Primary user: Iran
- Number built: +42

History
- Manufactured: 2012–present
- Introduction date: September 2013
- First flight: Spring 2012
- Developed from: Shahed 123
- Developed into: Shahed 149 Gaza

The Shahed 129 (Persian: شاهد ۱۲۹, English: "witness"; sometimes S129) is an Iranian single-engine medium-altitude long-endurance unmanned combat aerial vehicle (UCAV) designed by Shahed Aviation Industries for the Islamic Revolutionary Guard Corps (IRGC). The Shahed 129 is capable of combat and reconnaissance missions and has an endurance of 24 hours; it is similar in size, shape and role to the American MQ-1 Predator and is widely considered as one of the most capable drones in Iranian service.

The UAV has been used for airstrikes in the Syrian Civil War and for border patrol on Iran's eastern border. As of 2017 the Shahed 129 and Saegheh are expected to form the backbone of Iran's high-end UAV fleet for at least the next decade.

== Development ==
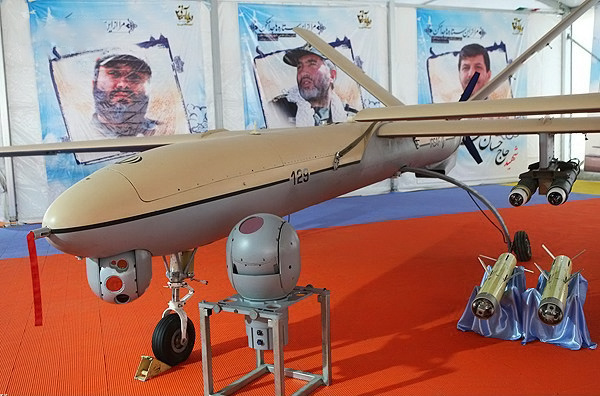
The first Shahed 129 prototype, with registration number 129-001, can be distinguished by its fixed rear landing gear.

Development began in 2005 when Iran Aircraft Manufacturing Industrial Company (HESA) began design work on the HESA-100 UAV. This was essentially the same design as the Shahed 129 but was shorter and with a squarish fuselage. Design responsibility was transferred to Shahed Aviation Industries Research Center, which renamed the HESA-100 the Shahed 123. Though little is known about it, the Shahed 123 is a production UAV in its own right, not a research project. The Shahed 123 was later developed into the Shahed 129. Both Shahed Aviation Industries and HESA have close ties to the IRGC. Alternatively, a number of sources have reported that the Shahed 129 was reverse engineered from an Israeli Hermes 450 UAV that crashed in Iran.

Two prototypes were built. The first, with model number 129-001, first flew in spring 2012 and was first used operationally to livestream footage of ballistic missile tests on 13 July 2012. The second prototype, with airframe model 129–002, flew in June 2012. The Shahed 129 was first seen in Iran's "Great Prophet 7" war games exercise in September of that year. The UAV entered serial production in September 2013. However, it suffered problems with its planned armament and did not make any drone strikes until early 2016, when new Sadid-345 precision-guided munitions were integrated.

The UAV is assembled by HESA. A total of 40 aircraft have been ordered, with deliveries scheduled to be completed by 2024. They are built at a rate of about three per year.

On March 15, 2023, one Shahed is reported to have a sensor attached to the bottom of its body.

== Design ==
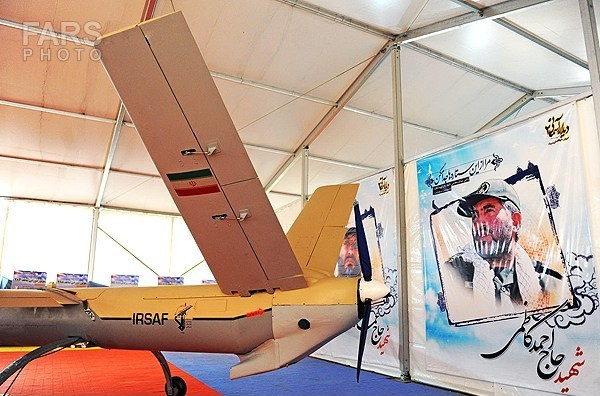
The Shahed 129's distinctive V-tail vertical stabilizer.

The Shahed 129 is a large single-engine propeller-driven UAV with V-tail vertical stabilizers, high-mounted straight wings, and a pusher configuration, generally similar to the MQ-1 Predator. It has a long, narrow cylindrical fuselage approximately 65–75 cm in diameter, and is fabricated from large panels of composite material with an aluminum alloy superstructure. It has a chin-mounted gimbal electro-optic/infrared sensor for day/night missions, retractable landing gear, (Note: The first prototype, with model number 129-001, has fixed landing gear and no weapons-carrying ability.) and a real-time video data link. There is also a payload bay under the drone's body, at the center of gravity. The Shahed 129 is powered by one Rotax 914 aircraft engine and has two twin hardpoints, for a total of up to four munitions.

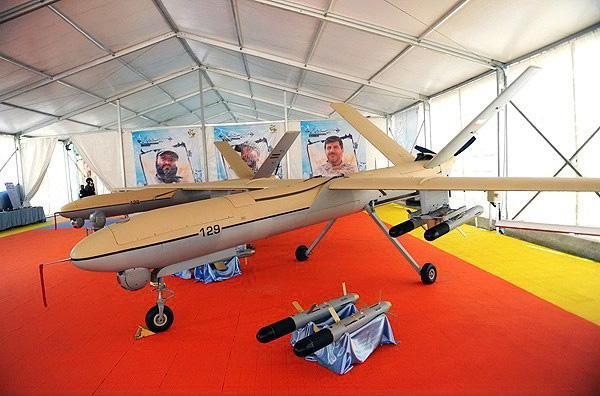
The first generation of the Shahed 129.

Originally, the Shahed 129 carried Sadid-1 anti-tank guided missiles, also known as Sadid-361 or Fat'h 362 missiles. This is a TV-guided anti-tank missile derived from Iran's Toophan missiles and is described by multiple sources as similar in design to the Israeli Spike-ER missile. The Sadid-361 was not operationally deployed; one source says this was due to problems with the launcher mechanism and guidance system, while others say R&D was not completed because American sanctions prevented Iran from obtaining necessary components. Later, this was replaced by the Sadid-345 precision-guided munition, also known as the Sadid guided bomb. Iranian sources claim the UAV can carry up to eight weapons, but in practice it is not seen with more than four. The Shahed 129 does not carry its weapons in canisters, a practice that was criticised by some aerospace experts, as it exposes the weapons' sensitive electronics to flight conditions.

Given that Iran regularly makes misleading claims about their UAVs, and that Shahed-129 made no known drone strikes for its first four years of flight, there were long doubts about the Shahed-129's claim to be a legitimate strike UAV. Since 2016, there is a general consensus that it is a legitimate UCAV capable of lethal force.

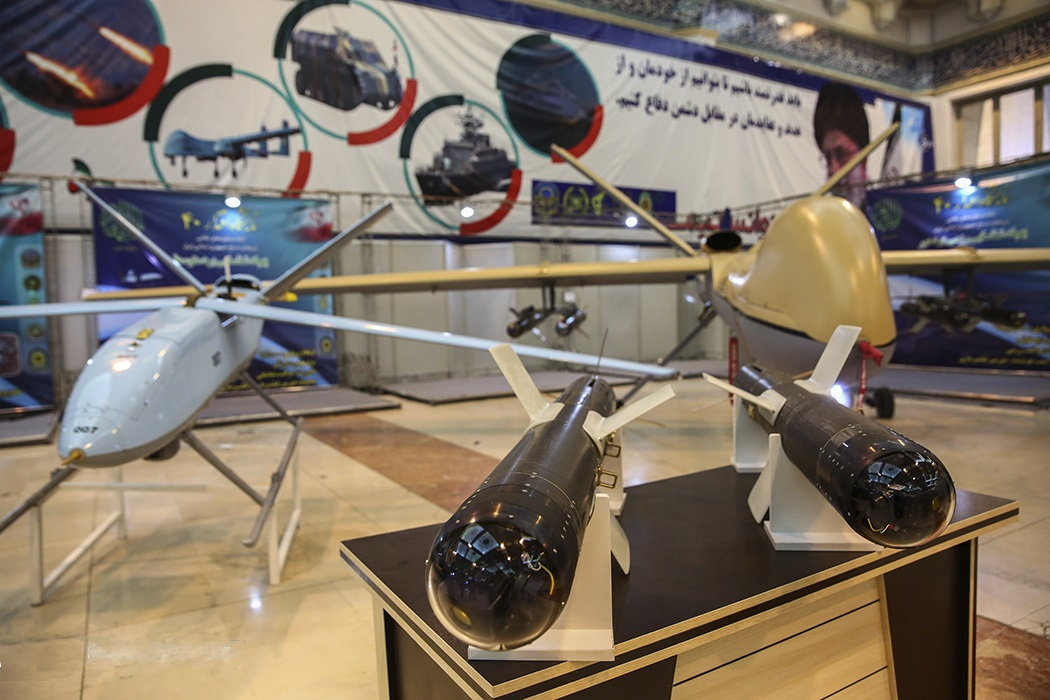
In the foreground are two Sadid-345 precision-guided munitions. To the rear is a Shahed 129, and to the left a blue Shahed 121.

Though the Shahed 129 airframe is likely capable of its claimed 1700 km combat range, it relies on a ground control station, which Iranian state media say is limited to a 200 km datalink. Independent analysts are more positive, saying the effective range is likely 300–400 km, but are clear that the drone's reliance on a ground station severely circumscribes its effective range. Other experts say the Shahed 129's datalink could likely not reach even 200 km. The drone can use an autopilot system, similar to that used on the Karrar UAV, to follow predefined way-points beyond its control station's communication range. The Shahed is claimed to have a 24-hour endurance, which is considered plausible but has not been independently verified.

== Operational history ==
A Shahed 129 flies over Damascus in April 2014.

In May 2014, two Shahed 129 aircraft were disassembled and airlifted on an Ilyushin Il-76 strategic airlifter to Damascus International Airport, along with their ground control stations and associated support crews, for use in the Syrian Civil War. The UAVs' first mission was to support the Quds Force and its militia allies. On 10 April 2014, rebels in Syria recorded a UAV resembling a Shahed 129 flying over Eastern Ghouta, Damascus. The war in Syria proved a good environment to test the Shahed 129, and three more were later transferred to Syria, where they are operated from Syrian Air Force bases. A Shahed 129 with what appears to be a single munition was spotted in the sky south of Aleppo in November 2014. The Shahed 129 made its first known drone strike in February 2016, which was the first wartime drone strike by Iran. There is some evidence Shahed 129s may have made a drone strike with Sadid-1 missiles in November 2015. A Shahed 129 was also used to provide bomb damage assessment for the 2017 Deir ez-Zor missile strike. The Shahed 129s have since performed hundreds of sorties in Syria against the Islamic State and rebel forces.

Two Shahed 129s were transferred to Iran's border with Pakistan in 2015, and were later supplemented by two more. Iranian military officials say that Shahed 129 UAV can increase Iran's surveillance capabilities in border areas such as the Persian Gulf and the Sea of Oman. Mohammad Ali Jafari described the UAV as "smart, accurate and inexpensive." Shahed 129s have been broadly dispersed and are not operated from any central airbase. As of 2017, two Shahed 129s were based in Damascus, Syria, three in Tactical Air Base 10 near Konarak, four in Bandar-Abbas, two on Abu Musa, and one in Urmia. Some number are also stationed in Semnan, and two are based in Kashan Air Base for training. In Syria, satellite imagery placed Shahed 129s at Hama Air Base and T4 airbase. In general, Iran has said little about the Shahed-129's use in Syria.

On 7 June 2017, Hezbollah released video showing an American MQ-1 or MQ-9 UAV flying near al-Tanf. Experts said the footage was "consistent" with video from Shahed-129s.

On 8 June 2017, one of the five Shahed 129s deployed to Syria attempted to conduct an airstrike against coalition personnel near al-Tanf, Syria, attacking them with one munition. Though the airstrike "was clearly meant as an attack on the coalition forces and partner forces in the area", it failed to damage any American or partner equipment and failed to injure or kill any American or partner personnel, because the munition failed to explode. The Shahed 129 was shot down by an American F-15E Strike Eagle.

Days later, on 20 June 2017, another F-15E Strike Eagle shot down another Shahed 129 drone again near Al-Tanf. The drone approached in a similar manner to the previous incident and was shot down before it reached the range at which it could deploy its weapons.

On the same day, on 20 June 2017, a Pakistani JF-17 shot down a Shahed 129 after it entered Pakistani airspace near Panjgur. It flew about 3–4 km into Pakistani airspace.

Overall, three Shahed 129s were shot down. An additional aircraft crashed in 2015 near Chabahar and is believed to have been rebuilt.

In spring 2019, Shahed 129s were used by the IRGC to assist in relief operations in flood-affected regions of Khuzestan Province, Iran.

On 3 February 2026, a Shahed 129 was shot down by a United States Navy F-35C as it approached the aircraft carrier USS Abraham Lincoln. The ship was located about 500 miles off the coast of Iran, no US personnel were harmed.

== Variants ==
A new Shahed 129 variant distinguishable by a bulging nose was developed by Shahed Aviation Industries in 2015 and revealed in February 2016. Iranian sources say this variant is equipped with satellite navigation, which will extend the range of the UAV. On the other hand, sources hostile to Iran say that as Iran has no satellites, the bulbous nose is unrelated to satellite guidance. Iran has not commented on the purpose of the redesigned nose, and Jane's speculates it could house a Ku-band beyond-line-of-sight satellite link or synthetic aperture radar. In addition, the payload is increased by 100 kg and the range is increased to 3000 km, according to Iran. A naval version called Simorgh was presented in December 2019. A variant with a possible external synthetic aperture radar was observed in 2023.

== Operators ==
Iran
Used by IRGC-ASF with 26–28 delivered, 3 shot down, leaving 23–25 in service (2018). (Note: In a 2017 article in Aviation Week & Space Technology, Shahed 129 expert Babak Taghvaee said 22 aircraft had been built. In a post on Twitter in 2019, he said 4 to 6 were manufactured in 2018, for a total of 26–28 built.) 40 ordered. A different source reports possibly 50 produced.

Russia
Russia is reported to have ordered 46 drones of various models. On 5 August 2022, Ukrainian officials claimed that Russian forces were operating these drones in combat over Ukraine, some of which are reported to be older models of the Shahed 129. Quoting a Ukrainian government official: "Advisor to the Ukrainian President’s Office, Oleksiy Arestovych, stated on August 5 that Iran handed 46 drones over to Russia and that the Ukrainian government has already noted the use of these drones in combat in Ukraine. At least a portion of the provided drones are older-generation “Shahed 129” heavy strike drones, which Russian forces may seek to use to attack US-provided HIMARS in Ukraine."

== Specifications (Shahed 129A) ==
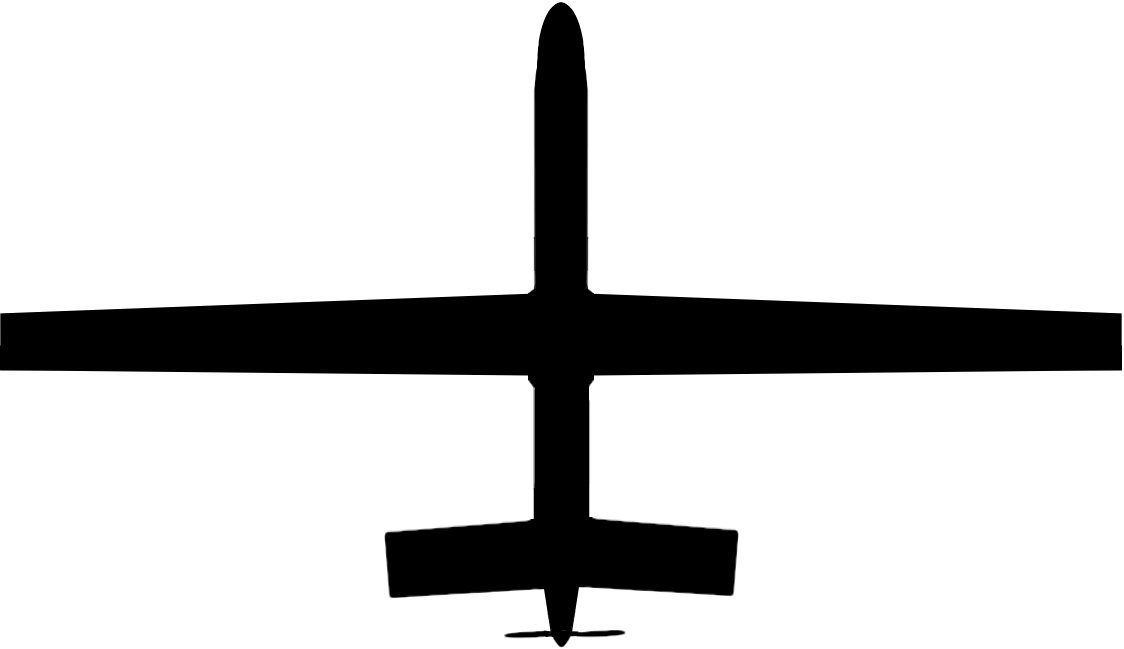

Data from Aviation Week unless otherwise cited

General characteristics

- Crew: none
- Capacity: 400 kg payload
- Length: 8 m (26 ft 3 in)
- Wingspan: 16 m (52 ft 6 in)
- Height: 3.1 m (10 ft 2 in)
- Powerplant: 1 × Rotax 914 four cylinder, four stroke aircraft engine 75 kW (100 shp)
- Propellers: 3-bladed

Performance

- Cruise speed: 150 km/h (93 mph, 81 kn)
- Combat range: 1,700 km (1,100 mi, 920 nmi)
- Ferry range: 3,400 km (2,100 mi, 1,800 nmi)
- Endurance: 24h
- Service ceiling: 7,300 m (24,000 ft)

Armament

- Bombs: 4 × Sadid-345 PGM

Avionics

- Oghab-6 electro-optical/infrared sensor (Note: The first few aircraft have different avionics.)
- Laser range finder

== See also ==
- Unmanned aerial vehicle

Related development

- Shahed 136
- Qods Mohajer-1
- Shahed 121
- Shahed 149 Gaza

Aircraft of comparable role, configuration, and era

- MQ-1 Predator
- Thales Watchkeeper WK450
- TAI Anka
- Elbit Hermes 450
- Kronshtadt Orion-E
- CH-4
- CAIG Wing Loong

Related lists

- List of unmanned aerial vehicles
