= HESA Shahed 285 =

Iranian attack helicopter

Shahed 285
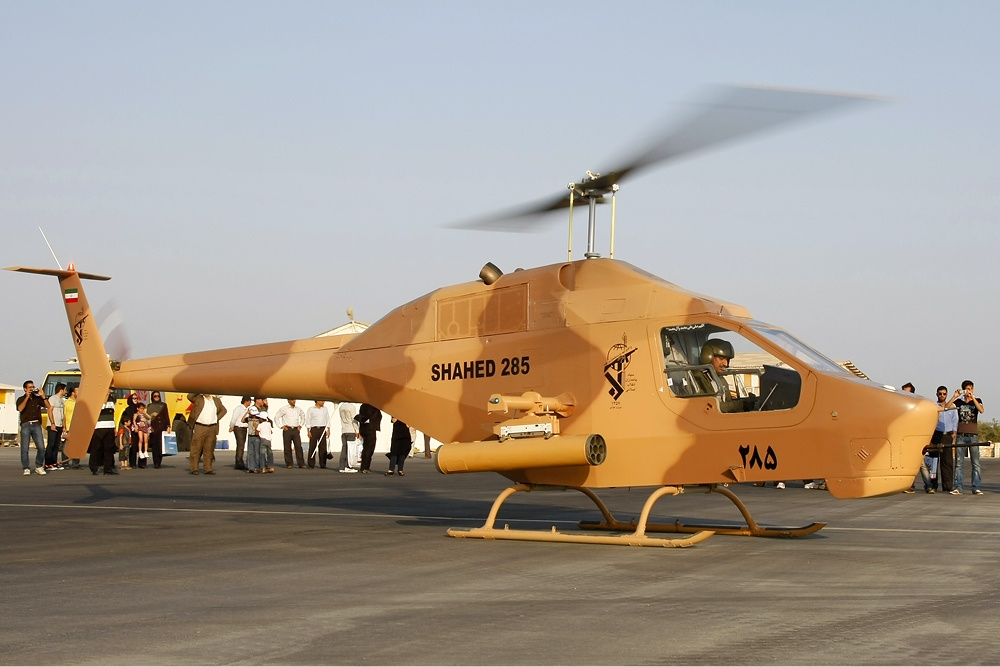
- Shahed 285 of the Iranian Revolutionary Guard Air Force (2010)

General information
- Type: light attack/reconnaissance helicopter
- Manufacturer: HESA
- Designer: Shahed Aviation Industries Research Center
- Primary user: Islamic Republic of Iran Navy

History
- Introduction date: Iran
- First flight: 2009
- Developed from: Bell 206 & Panha Shabaviz 2061

HESA Shahed 285 (Persian: شاهد ۲۸۵) is a light attack/reconnaissance helicopter developed in Iran. It was unveiled on 24 May 2009. Two versions were developed, a light attack/recon version and a maritime patrol/anti-ship version.

== Design and development ==
The Shahed 285 is based on the composite Shahed-278, which is a relatively light helicopter with 682 kg (1,504 lb) empty weight, derived from the Bell 206 Jetranger. (Note: "HESA Shahed [Jet Ranger 206]". GlobalSecurity.org. 2019-07-08.) Compared to the American OH-58 Kiowa that retains the airframe of the Bell 206, the Shahed 285 is a single-seater with a narrower fuselage, but retains the tail and powerplant/rotor structures, and is intended for military use. Although designed by the IRGC, this helicopter is scheduled to be produced by HESA. (Note: "HESA Shahed 285 / AH-85 (Witness)". Military Factory. 2017-11-18.)

Shahed 285 comes in two variants. AH-85A which is a land based variant and AH-85C which is a naval one. AH-85A is armed with 14 2.75 in (70 mm) rockets and a PKMT light machine gun either on a rotatable turret or on a static mount, or an NSV heavy machine gun in an underfuselage gondola (latest version). It also uses an EO/IR camera on its top.

Instead of the machine gun, AH-85C has a search and track radar on its chin to find and track enemy ships. Its range is estimated between 30–40 km (19–25 mi). It either uses two Kowsar or eight Sadid-1 anti-ship missiles. To fire these missiles, AH-85C relies on a Multi-function display in its cockpit. (Note: شاهد285 شمشير بُرنده سپاه+عکس [Witness 285 Swordsman Winning Photo Corps]. Mashreq News (in Persian). 2011-04-27.)

== Specifications (Shahed 285 / AH-85A) ==
Data from

General characteristics

- Crew: 1
- Length: 11.84 m (38 ft 10 in)
- Width: 2.78 m (9 ft 1 in) (fuselage)
- Height: 3.47 m (11 ft 5 in)
- Empty weight: 820 kg (1,808 lb)
- Max takeoff weight: 1,450 kg (3,197 lb)
- Powerplant: 1 × Rolls-Royce Model 250-C20J turboshaft, 310 kW (420 shp)
- Main rotor diameter: 10 m (32 ft 10 in)

Performance

- Maximum speed: 240 km/h (150 mph, 130 kn)
- Cruise speed: 200 km/h (120 mph, 110 kn)
- Range: 875 km (544 mi, 472 nmi)
- Service ceiling: 4,160 m (13,650 ft)
- Rate of climb: 7.6 m/s (1,500 ft/min)

Armament

- Guns:
  - 1x nose-mounted PKMT light machine gun (early models)
  - 1x nose-mounted NSV machine gun (later models)
- Rockets: 14x 2.75 in (70 mm) rockets

== See also ==
- Atlas XH-1 Alpha
- Bell 207 Sioux Scout
- Cicaré CH-14 Aguilucho
- IAR 317 Airfox
- Patrol-LA
- Shahed 216 (helicopter)
