= M47 Dragon =

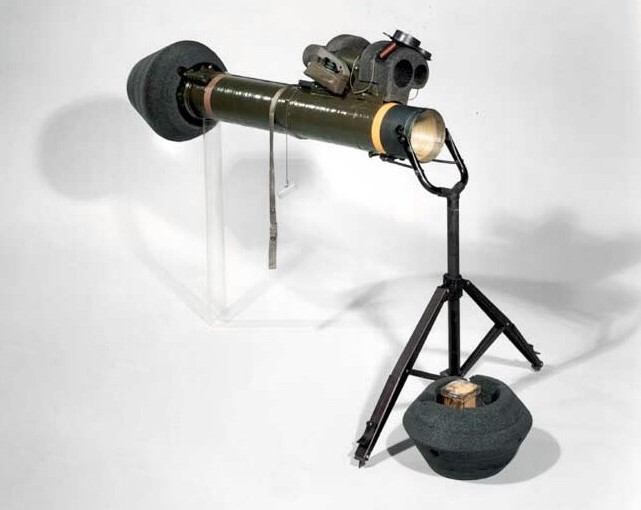
- An M47 Dragon, shown here with its daytime tracker attached.
- Type: Anti-tank missile
- Place of origin: United States

Service history
- In service: 1975–1990s (US Army); 1975–2001 (US Marine Corps); 1979–present (other countries)
- Used by: See Operators
- Wars: Iran–Iraq War; 1982 Lebanon War; Invasion of Grenada; Western Sahara War; Gulf War; Yemeni Civil War; Conflict in Najran, Jizan and Asir

Production history
- Designer: Raytheon
- Designed: 3 March 1966
- Manufacturer: McDonnell Douglas, Raytheon
- Produced: 1975
- No. built: 7,000 launchers, 33,000 missiles (U.S. Army); 17,000 missiles (U.S. Marine Corps); 250,000 missiles (total)
- Variants: Dragon II, Dragon III, Saeghe 1, 2, 3 and 4

Specifications (FGM-77)
- Mass: 32.1 lb (14.57 kg) (w/ day sight); 46.9 lb (21.29 kg) (w/ night sight)
- Length: 1,154 mm (45.4 in)
- Diameter: 140 mm
- Crew: 1
- Effective firing range: 65–1,000 meters
- Maximum firing range: 1,000 meters; 1,500 meters (Dragon III)
- Warhead: Hollow charge
- Warhead weight: 3.5 lb (1.6 kg) Octol
- Maximum speed: Dragon/Dragon II: 85 to 110 m/s (280 to 360 ft/s); Dragon III: 185 to 220 m/s (610 to 720 ft/s)
- Guidance system: SACLOS

The M47 Dragon, known as the FGM-77 during development, is an American shoulder-fired, man-portable anti-tank guided missile system. It was phased out of U.S. military service in 2001, in favor of the newer FGM-148 Javelin system.

The M47 Dragon uses a wire-guidance system in concert with a high explosive anti-tank warhead and was capable of defeating armored vehicles, fortified bunkers, main battle tanks, and other hardened targets. While it was primarily created to defeat the Soviet Union's T-55, T-62, and T-72 tanks, it saw use well into the 1990s, seeing action in the Persian Gulf War. The U.S. military officially retired the weapon in 2001. The United States destroyed the last of its stocks of the missile in 2009. The weapon system remains in active service with other militaries around the world.

== History ==
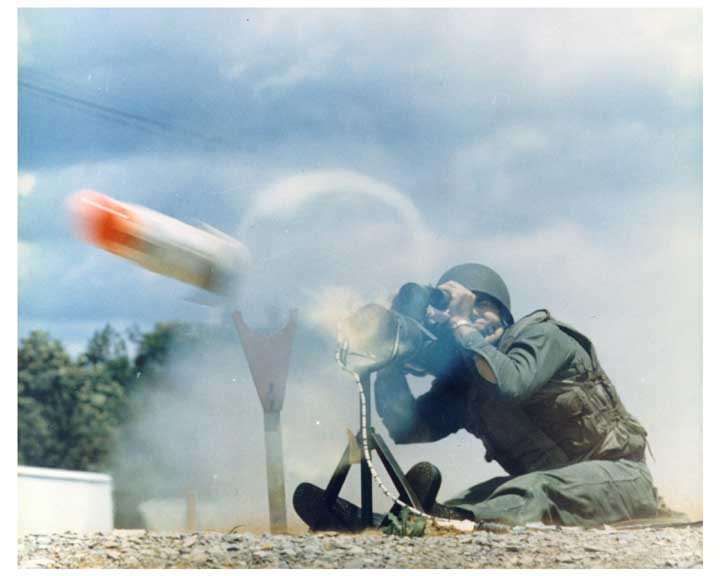
A U.S. Army soldier firing M47 Dragon.

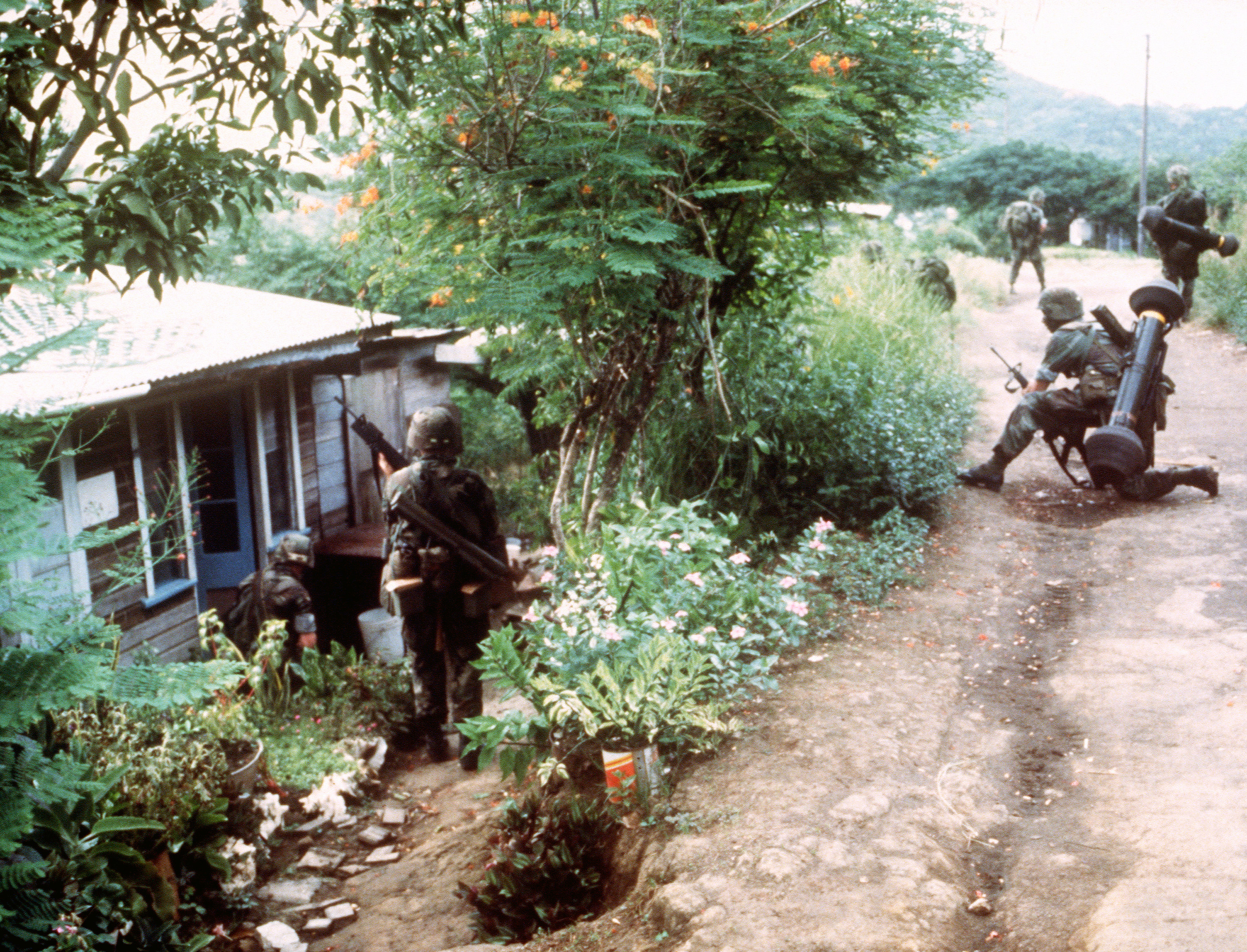
U.S. Army soldiers from the 82nd Airborne Division armed with the M47 Dragon during the 1983 Invasion of Grenada.

In 1959, the US Army Ordnance Missile Command suggested the development of a heavy medium range assault weapon.

In 1960, the United States Army launched the MAW (Medium Anti-tank Weapon) program on a proposal from Douglas. In 1966, Douglas was awarded the contract to develop the XM47. In 1967, the XM47 was redesignated FGM-77 and FTM-77 (the FTM-77 being the training version). The first missile test took place in December 1967 followed by the first shot in real conditions (firing set, guidance and launcher) on 5 July 1968.

Used by the U.S. Army, the U.S. Marine Corps, as well as many foreign militaries, the M47 Dragon was first fielded in January 1975 to U.S. Army soldiers stationed in mainland Europe. In April 1981, the deployment of the base version of the Dragon in the Army was complete. The Army initially deployed the Dragon as a squad weapon, with every rifle squad containing an antiarmor specialist who carried the weapon.

Reorganization in the 1990s saw Dragons moved, with mechanized infantry receiving two launchers per squad. Infantry, Airborne, and Air Assault units received a pair of two-man ATGM teams in the platoon's weapons squad, while Light Infantry (six teams) and Ranger (three teams) units held their Dragons at the company level.

In USMC service, the Dragon was concentrated at the battalion level in a dedicated missile platoon with 32 Dragon teams. The platoon was organized with four sections, each with four squads of two 2-man teams.

== Guidance system ==
The M47 Dragon uses a so-called "tracking control assembly" (TCA) guidance system previously used on the TOW and Shillelagh missiles. With this system, all that is required of the infantryman is to look through an amplifying optical sight and keep it exactly aligned with the objective.

During this time, a second electro-optical system mounted parallel to the sight visually receives thermal radiation (generally infrared) from a pyrotechnic system located on the tail of the missile and focuses it on a sensitive receiver / locator. This continuously measures via a computer the position of the heat source (the missile) in relation to the line of sight fixed on the objective, any deviation automatically causing the desired correction signal, which is in turn transmitted along wires (connecting the missile to the launcher) and without any intervention by the operator.

== Variants ==
=== Dragon ===
The basic missile, the M222 missile, weighs 11.5 kilograms and is 744mm long in a 1154mm long launch tube. The fairly basic warhead can penetrate 330 mm of armor plate.

=== Dragon II ===
Dragon II is a simple warhead upgrade, originally called "Dragon PIP" and officially known as MK1 MOD0 or Second generation Dragon. The Dragon II received a new warhead that offers an 85% increase in penetration, to about 610mm. Weight increased to 12.3 kilograms and length to 846mm. Dragon II entered service in 1988.

=== Dragon III ===
A further improved Dragon II, the Dragon III received an even more powerful tandem shaped charge warhead, reportedly a Dragon II head with additional precursor charge. Exact penetration remains unknown, but is likely an improvement over the Dragon II. The motor is improved, allowing the missile to reach a range of 1,000 meters in 6.5 seconds, much faster than the original missile's 11 second flight time. The improved motor increases the range as well, propelling Dragon III to 1,500 meters.

The second final improvement is a new combined day/night tracker with laser guidance. Only the United States Marine Corps bought this variant, beginning in 1991, while the Army opted to wait for Javelin to enter service.

=== Dragon IIIA ===
Same as Dragon III on missile capability, except updated Daylight sight tracker and Night sight tracker their stadia rangefinding lines from 1000 meters change to fitted to 1500 meters, has been said new missile capability with maintain use older and low cost sight.

=== Saeghe ===
Iran has reverse-engineered a version of the Dragon, the Saeghe (Persian: صاعقه "lightning"). This version, like many other reverse engineered weaponry built in Iran, is developed by Defense Industries Organization (DIO). They displayed it in 2002 at the Defendory exhibition in Athens, when it was in mass production. Hezbollah has acquired Saeghes for anti-tank and anti-armor uses.

Known versions include Saeghe 1, a copy of Dragon II and Saeghe 2, a copy of Dragon III. Saeghe 3 is not confirmed to exist and Saeghe 4 is believed to use a thermobaric warhead. It is mostly produced for export, only issued to the Islamic Revolutionary Guard Corps.

Saeghe (also transliterated as Saegheh, Saeqeh and several other variations) is a very common name for Iranian weapon systems. Other things with the name include a recon drone, a target drone, a fighter jet based on the American F-5E, an air-to-air missile, and an RPG-7 warhead.

== Components ==
The launcher system of the M47 Dragon consists of a smoothbore fiberglass tube, breech/gas generator, tracker, bipod, battery, sling, and forward and aft shock absorbers. To fire the weapon, non-integrated day or night sights must be attached. While the launcher itself is expendable, the sights can be removed and reused.

=== Kollsman SU-36/P Day Sight ===
The SU-36/P, properly "Infrared Tracker, Guided Missile, SU-36/P", provides the user with control over the missile. The sight slots onto the missile tube and The SU-36/P has a 6x magnification capability and a viewing angle of 6°. The simple crosshair reticle has a pair of stadia lines To the right of the gunner's monocular is an infrared receiver, consisting of a large lens fitted with a filter used to capture the infrared signal emitted by the missile during its flight.

=== Philips AN/TAS-5 Night Sight Tracker ===
The Dragon night sight tracker (AN/TAS-5) increases the gunner's ability to engage targets during limited visibility. Targets can be engaged during daylight and also during limited visibility such as smoke, fog, or darkness. The AN/TAS-5 has 4x/5x magnification and the stadia lines remain the same. It features a narrow field of view of 3.4° by 6.8°, which is fixed. It uses a red-orange and black or white color palette to differentiate between warmer (red-orange) and cooler (black or white) objects. This display color scheme was the same as found on other thermal imaging sight, such as the AN/TAS-4 mounted on the original M220 TOW launcher, the original version up to A2 ODS variant Bradley, and the M901 Hammerhead (by the way, the AN/TAS-4a was not this color, instead using green and black or white). Realistically, this is a thermal imaging sight rather than a pure night vision sight. It is heavier than the daylight sight, as the AN/TAS-5 weighs 9.82 kg and requires a battery with a lasting life of 2 hours.

== Operators ==
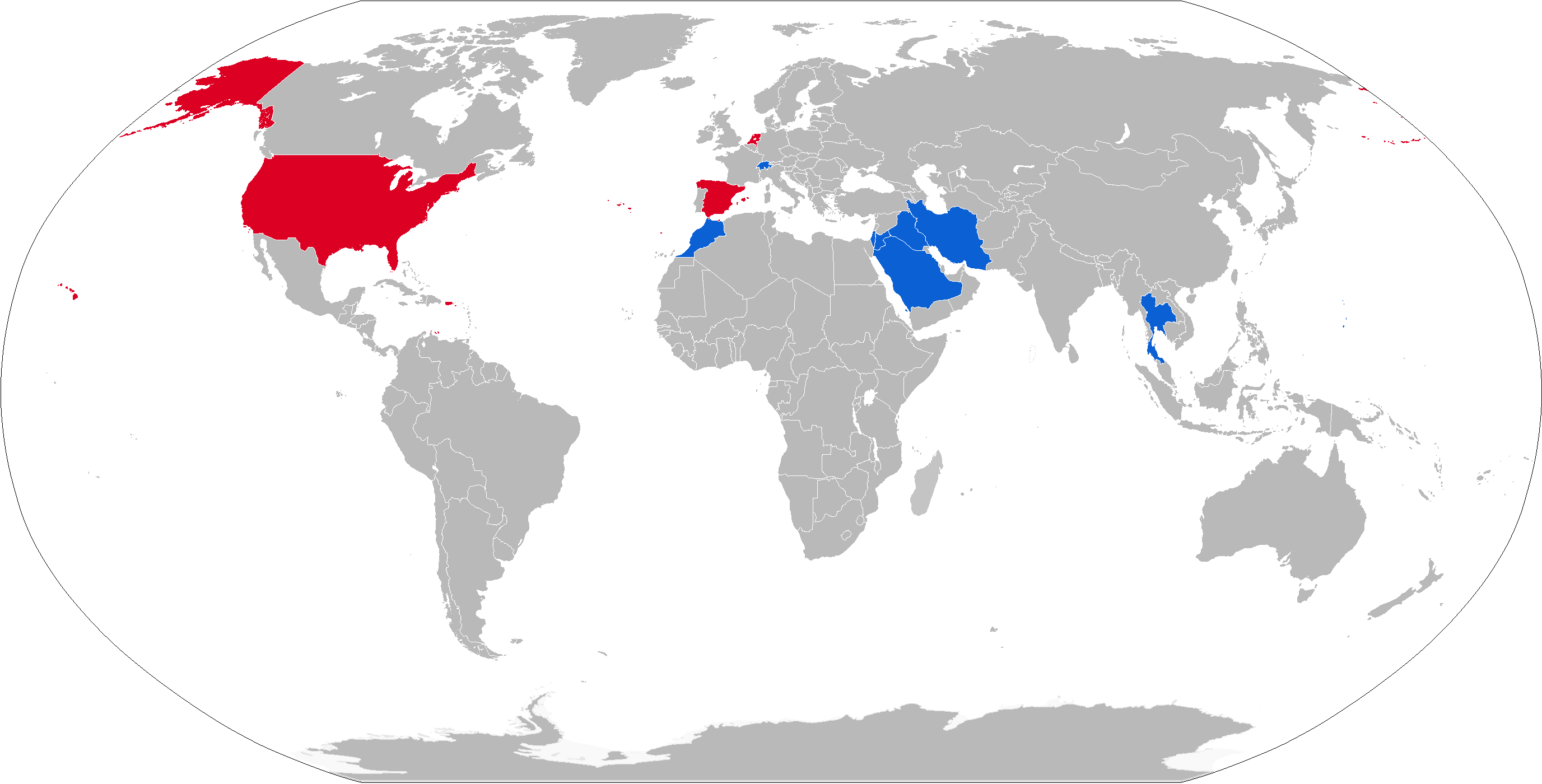
Operators Current Former

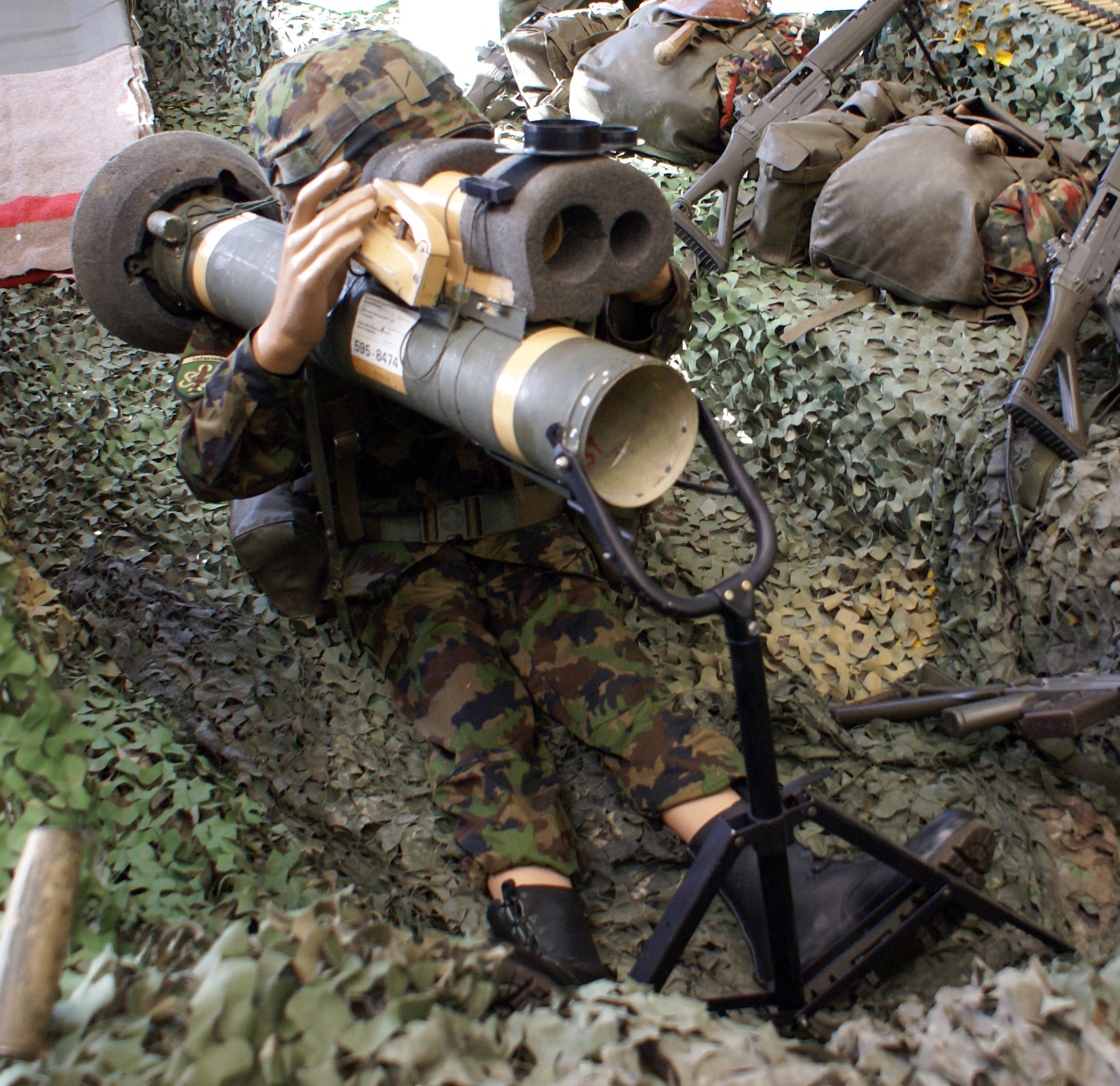
A Swiss Army M47 Dragon on display in October 2006.

=== Current operators ===
- Iran: Saeghe
- Iraq: Saeghe used by PMF militias.
- Morocco
- Saudi Arabia
- Syria: Saeghe
- Sudan: Saeghe 2 being used by Sudanese military and RSF forces.
- Thailand

=== Former operators ===
- Israel
- Iraqi Republic: Acquired M47 Dragons captured from Iran during the Iran-Iraq War. Not operational and not in use.
- Jordan: Replaced by the FGM-148 Javelin
- Netherlands: Was replaced by the Spike in August 2001.
- Spain: Phased out of service, being replaced by the Spike.
- Switzerland Phased out, not directly replaced (6,200 ordered in 1979, 5,600 ordered in 1981)
- United States: Replaced by the FGM-148 Javelin.

=== Non-state actors ===
- Hezbollah: Iranian Saeghe version.
- Houthis: Iranian Saeghe version.

== See also ==
- FGM-148 Javelin – successor to the FGM-77 Dragon
- Mk 153 Shoulder-Launched Multipurpose Assault Weapon (SMAW)
- SRAW – (United States)
- Eryx – (France)
