= Shahed Aviation Industries =

Iranian aerospace company

Shahed Aviation Industries Research Center (مرکز تحقیقات صنایع هوایی شاهد) is an Iranian aerospace company known for designing military helicopters and UAVs. They are associated with the Islamic Revolutionary Guard Corps Aerospace Force (IRGC-ASF) and the Iran Aircraft Manufacturing Industries Corporation (HESA).

== Products ==
=== Helicopters ===
- HESA Shahed 274
- HESA Shahed 278
- HESA Shahed 285

=== Drones ===
- Shahed 121
- Shahed 123
- Shahed 125
- Shahed 129
- Shahed 131
- HESA Shahed 136
- Shahed 141
- Shahed 149 Gaza
- Shahed 161
- Shahed Saegheh-1
- Shahed 171 Simorgh
- Shahed 191 (Saegheh-2)
- Shahed 197
- Shahed 238

== Sanctions ==
On 20 October 2022, the European Union imposed sanctions against Shahed Aviation Industries, saying the company is supplying drones to support Russia in the Russo-Ukrainian war. Russia released no statement about whether or not they were using them. In November 2022, Shahed Aviation was also sanctioned by the United States and Canada.
