= Shahed 171 Simorgh =

Iranian unmanned aerial vehicle

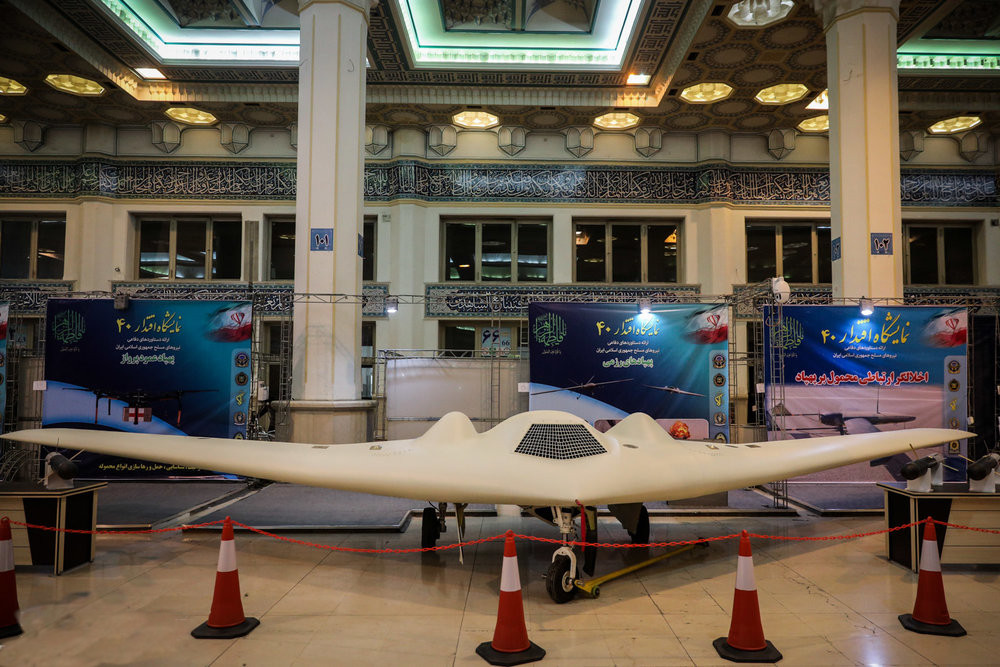

General information
- Type: Multirole
- National origin: Iran
- Manufacturer: Shahed Aviation Industries
- Status: Active
- Primary user: IRGC AF

History
- Manufactured: 2010s–present
- First flight: 2014
- Developed from: RQ-170 Sentinel

The Shahed 171 Simorgh (sometimes S-171 and called IRN-170 by the US government) is an Iranian jet-powered flying wing unmanned combat aerial vehicle (UCAV) produced by Shahed Aviation Industries.

Its design is based on a reverse engineered American RQ-170 UAV captured by Iran in 2011 and modified to carry guided missiles. It is one of two Iranian flying wing UAVs based on the RQ-170, along with the Saegheh, a smaller version, with which it is often confused.

== Etymology ==
Simorgh is a Persian word deriving from Middle Persian 𐭮𐭩𐭭𐭬𐭥𐭫𐭥 sēnmurw, which was a benevolent bird in Persian mythology.

== Design ==
The Simorgh is a reverse engineered RQ-170. There are multiple unknown variants, one of which is modified to play the role of a UCAV armed with 4 missiles. An author stated it was a crude mock-up mostly made out of fiberglass. It was used with munitions during the 2020 Joint Exercise Zolfaghar 99.

== Status ==
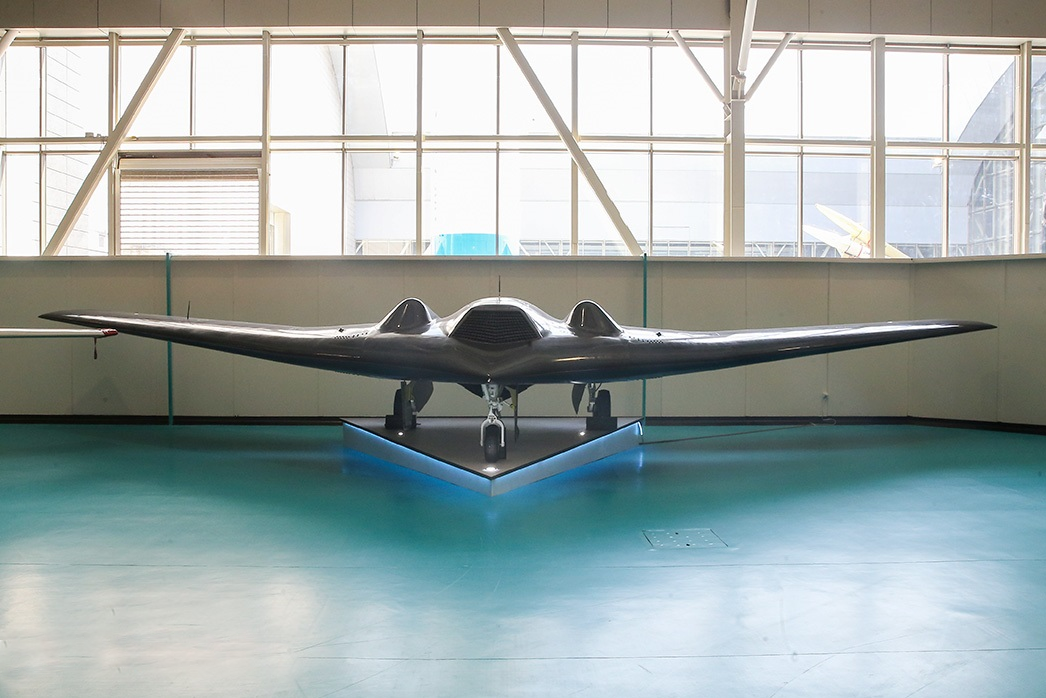
Shahed 171

According to the United States Government, a company associated with Imam Hossein University, Paravar Pars Company, was involved in the reverse engineering and research, development, and production of the Shahed 171.

Two were under construction as of 2014. In 2014 Iran said that they would have four in service by March 2015.

The UAV was first seen in May 2015 and was shown flying on Iranian TV in October 2016. Jane's analysis placed the UAV at Kashan Air Base.

Some sources report that a Shahed 171 may have been shot down in the February 2018 Israel–Syria incident, but the UAV was probably the very similar Saegheh.

== Operators ==
Iran

- Islamic Revolutionary Guard Corps - Aerospace Force

== See also ==
=== Related development ===
- Lockheed Martin RQ-170 Sentinel
- Shahed Saegheh

=== Aircraft of comparable role, configuration and era ===
- Northrop Grumman RQ-180
- Mikoyan Skat
- Sukhoi Okhotnik
- Northrop Grumman Bat
