= Lexington Institute =

American defense issues think tank

Coordinates: 38.8953°N 77.0771°W

- Established: 1998
- Key people: James Courter; Merrick Carey; Rebecca Grant; Paul Steidler; Samuel Obitts
- Budget: Revenue: $2,136,371; Expenses: $2,066,977 (FYE December 2015)
- Location: 1600 Wilson Boulevard; Arlington, Virginia
- Website: www.lexingtoninstitute.org

The Lexington Institute is a center-right think tank headquartered in Arlington, Virginia, United States. It focuses mainly on defense and security policy.

== History, staff, and positions ==
The Lexington Institute was founded in 1998 by former U.S. Representative James Courter (R-NJ), former congressional aide Merrick "Mac" Carey, and former Georgetown University professor Loren B. Thompson, who are the chairman, chief executive officer and chief operating officer of the Institute, respectively.

The think tank is based in Arlington, Virginia and focuses on defense, regulatory policy and logistics. It is sometimes described as conservative.

The Lexington Institute is funded in large part by military contractors and other corporations. The institute has gradually moved away from advocating for education reform while retaining its focus on national defense, particularly with regard to technology investment.

The Institute has been criticized for its financial relationship with the defense industry; Harper's Magazine called the organization the industry's "pay-to-play ad agency" based on its usually favorable assessments of military weapons programs. Loren Thompson is also a consultant to military contractors.

In 2011, Thompson said that the current rate of U.S. defense spending was not sustainable. He has also called for a shift in American defense spending towards items such as the Littoral Combat Ship and the Lockheed Martin F-35 Lightning II that can be exported to allies.

Thompson wrote that in 2011 that most of the candidates for the 2012 Republican presidential nomination were "unsuited to high office."

The Lexington Institute also researches electricity policy and the US electricity grid, including on issues such as electric grid security, resiliency, the effect of electric vehicles, and distributed generation incentives, and issues relating to data privacy and cyber threat information-sharing.
