= Sadid-1 =

Iranian anti-tank missile

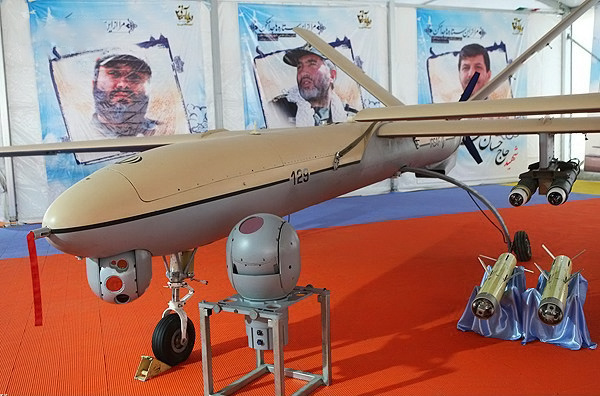
Sadid-1 ATGMs (far right, ground) near their intended launch platform, the Shahed 129.

The Sadid-1 (also known as the Sadid-361, the Fat'h 362, and the Sadid-342) is an Iranian TV-guided anti-tank missile derived from Iran's Toophan missiles.

It is described by multiple sources as similar in design to the Israeli Spike-ER missile, and was intended as the armament for Iran's Shahed 129 UAV.

== History ==
A mockup of the Sadid-1 was first seen at Iran's 2010 Kish Air Show. As of 2016, the Sadid-1's guidance system, laser/TV seeker and propulsion unit were still under development.

== Design ==
Detailed information about the Sadid-1 has not been disclosed; however, it is believed to be about 140 cm long, to have a range of 4000 meters, and to have a maximum flight time of about thirty seconds.

== Combat history ==
The Sadid-1 was a proposed armament for the Shahed 216, an exceptionally obscure attack helicopter proposal from HESA/Shahed Aviation around 2015.

The Sadid-1 was not operationally deployed on the Shahed 129; one source says this was due to problems with the launcher mechanism and guidance system, while another source says that R&D was not completed because American sanctions prevented Iran from obtaining necessary components.

In 2018, Iran claimed to use Sadid-1 munitions dropped from a Saegheh UAV.

== Operators ==
Iran

=== Launch platforms ===
- Shahed 129 (failed, not integrated)
- Shahed 285
- Saegheh
- Makran IFV

== See also ==
- Toophan – (Iran)
