= 2011 Iran RQ-170 capture =

Iranian capture of a US. surveillance drone

On 5 December 2011, an American Lockheed Martin RQ-170 Sentinel unmanned aerial vehicle (UAV) was captured by Iranian forces near the city of Kashmar in northeastern Iran. The Iranian government announced that the UAV was brought down by its cyberwarfare unit, which had commandeered the aircraft and safely landed it, after initial reports from Western news sources had claimed that it had been shot down. The United States government initially denied the claims but President Barack Obama later acknowledged that the downed aircraft was a US drone. Iran filed a complaint with the United Nations over the airspace violation. Obama asked Iran to return the drone. Iran is said to have produced drones based on the captured RQ-170, including the Shahed 171 Simorgh and the Shahed Saeqeh.

== Capture ==
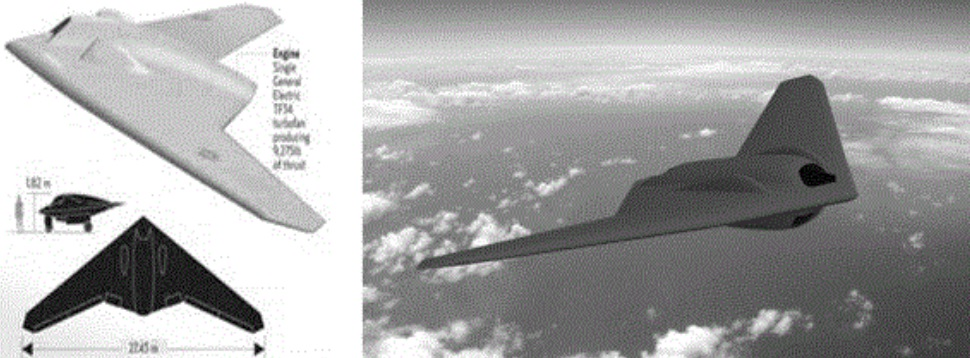
Images of the RQ-170 Sentinel taken from a US Army recognition manual

The government of Iran announced that the aircraft was detected in Iranian airspace 225 kilometers (140 mi) from the border with Afghanistan, and it was brought down with minimal damage by its cyberwarfare unit stationed near Kashmar.

The government of the United States initially claimed that its forces in Afghanistan had lost control of a UAV on 4 December 2011, and that there was a possibility that this was the vehicle that crashed near Kashmar. According to unnamed US officials, a UAV operated by the Central Intelligence Agency was flying on the Afghan side of the Afghanistan–Iran border when its operators lost control of the vehicle. The UAV may have been surveilling nuclear facilities in Iran.

The drone appeared to be largely intact, except for possible minor visible damage on its left wing. Dan Goure, an analyst at the Lexington Institute, stated the largely intact airframe ruled out the possibility of an engine or navigational malfunction: "Either this was a cyber/electronic warfare attack system that brought the system down or it was a glitch in the command-and-control system." At least one US source admitted that Iran could have interrupted the data link and brought it to a soft landing. Some US officials stated the drone broke into three pieces during impact. They claimed that it was reassembled for display purposes and was painted by Iran to hide the damage. Prior to this event a significant keystroke-logging virus infection was reported at a U.S. drone command center. Reports indicate it occurred at Creech Air Force Base in Nevada in October 2011, which raises the question if these events are connected. The United States Department of Defense released a statement acknowledging that it had lost control of a UAV during the previous week, claiming that it was "flying a mission over western Afghanistan" when control was lost. The U.S. government also stated that it was still investigating the cause of the loss.

An article in The Christian Science Monitor relates an Iranian engineer's assertion that the drone was captured by jamming both satellite and land-originated control signals to the UAV, causing the UAV to fall back to GPS autopilot. Iran followed up with a GPS spoofing attack that fed the UAV false GPS data to make it land in Iran at what the drone thought was its home base in Afghanistan. UAV guidance could have been targeted by an Avtobaza radar jamming and deception system supplied to Iran by Russia. In an interview for Nova, U.S. retired Lt. General David Deptula said "There was a problem with the aircraft and it landed in an area it wasn't supposed to land".

American aeronautical engineers dispute this, pointing out that — as is the case with the MQ-1 Predator, the MQ-9 Reaper, and the Tomahawk missile — "GPS is not the primary navigation sensor for the RQ-170... The vehicle gets its flight path orders from an inertial navigation system". Inertial navigation continues to be used on military aircraft despite the advent of GPS because GPS signal jamming and spoofing are relatively simple operations.

== US acknowledgement ==
On 5 December 2011, US military sources confirmed that the remains of an RQ-170 had been captured by Iranian forces. Media reports indicated that various US officials declined to confirm whether or not the drone in the video released by Iranian state television was authentic. On 8 December 2011, a senior US official, speaking on condition of anonymity, told The Washington Post that the US cannot be certain the drone shown was real because the US does not have access to it, but also stated that "We have no indication that it was brought down by hostile fire." A second senior US military official said that a major question is how the drone could have remained "virtually intact," given the high altitude from which it is said to have crashed. US Navy Captain John Kirby, a Pentagon spokesman, told a news conference on 8 December 2011 that Pentagon analysts were examining the video. Both Kirby and fellow spokesman George Little would not comment further on whether the US military believed the drone was the one missing, both did say that the missing drone had not been recovered. Later that day, CBS reported that the US officials had confirmed in private the authenticity of the drone shown by the Iranians.

On 6 December 2011, US officials acknowledged that a drone crashed in or near Iranian airspace and that it belonged to the CIA and not to ISAF as was earlier stated. US officials did not state that the drone shown on Iranian television was actually a real RQ-170 (which has been public knowledge since 2009).

== Complaint to UN Security Council ==
On 9 December 2011, Iran lodged a formal complaint to the United Nations Security Council over the UAV violating its airspace. Iran's UN ambassador stated in the letter that "My government emphasizes that this blatant and unprovoked air violation by the United States government is tantamount to an act of hostility against the Islamic Republic of Iran in clear contravention of international law, in particular, the basic tenets of the United Nations Charter."

== Request for return by the United States ==
On 12 December 2011, the US administration asked Iran to return the captured drone. The day before, on 11 December, General Salami stated that "no nation welcomes other countries' spy drones in its territory, and no one sends back the spying equipment and its information back to the country of origin." On 13 December 2011, the Defence Minister of Iran dismissed the request and said "Instead of apologising to the Iranian nation, it [the United States] is brazenly asking for the drone back." The ministry spokesman, Ramin Mehmanparast, stated that "it seems he [Obama] has forgotten that Iran's airspace was violated, spying operations were undertaken, international laws were violated and that Iran's internal affairs were interfered with... . Instead of an official apology and admitting to this violation, they are making this request."

Former US Vice President Dick Cheney criticized Obama's decisions on the drone, saying that after the aircraft went down, the president should have ordered an airstrike within Iran: "The right response to that would have been to go in immediately after it had gone down and destroy it. You can do that from the air ... and, in effect, make it impossible for them to benefit from having captured that drone." Instead, "he asked nicely for them to return it, and they aren't going to".

On 17 January 2012, the Aaye Art Group, an Iranian company, said it would send miniature, toy versions of the captured drone to President Obama as a response to the request for sending the drone back.

== Reverse engineering of the drone ==
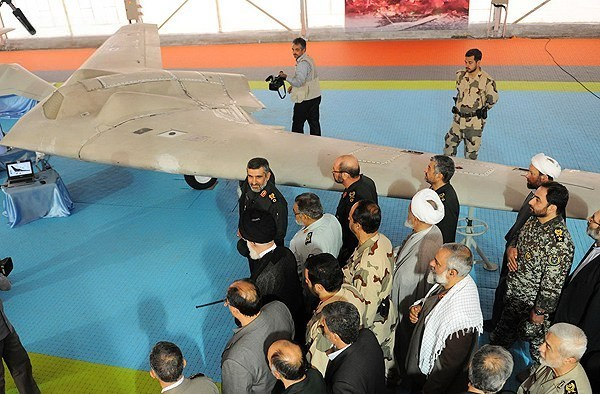
Iranian-built copy of the RQ-170 in 2014

On 10 December 2011, Iran announced that it intended to reverse engineer the captured RQ-170 Sentinel stealth aircraft. In April 2012, the Islamic Revolutionary Guard Corps claimed to have succeeded in extracting the entirety of the data collected by the drone and had begun the process of building a replica of the aircraft. Iran claimed to have been approached by countries, including China and Russia, seeking information on the drone. Although US officials expressed concern over the possibility of China or Russia receiving the drone's technology, they cast doubt on whether Iran could replicate the technology of the aircraft, as well as the amount of intelligence data available, due to the precautions installed for malfunctioning drones.

In May 2014, Iranian state TV displayed what was claimed to be a reverse-engineered RQ-170. Sources familiar with the RQ-170's design said that the Iranian RQ-170 was merely a static mock-up rather than a flyable aircraft. In November 2014 Iran claimed to have carried out a successful test flight of an aircraft based on reverse engineering of the RQ-170.

The semi-official Tasnim News Agency of Iran reported in September 2016 that a UAV named Sa'egheh, similar in appearance to the RQ-170 Sentinel, had been built. It was said to be able to carry four precision-guided bombs; the range was not stated.

In 2016, Iran unveiled the Simorgh, designed after the RQ-170.

The Israeli military shot down a Sa'egheh during the February 2018 Israel–Syria incident. Israeli media reported that the UAV's design was indeed largely based on the RQ-170. IAF Brigadier General Tomer Bar said that the drone was quite advanced and emulated Western technology.

== Decoded footage obtained from captured US drone ==
On 7 February 2013, Iran released video footage allegedly from the RQ-170 stealth plane. They claimed the footage showed the drone coming in for a landing at the Kandahar base. Commander of the Aerospace Division of the Islamic Revolution Guards Corps (IRGC) Brigadier General Amir-Ali Hajizadeh said that all the data on the downed drone was "fully decoded.".

== See also ==
- Islamic Republic of Iran Air Defense Force
- Yasir (UAV) – An Iranian UAV based on an American ScanEagle drone that was captured in a similar incident
- Saegheh (UAV) – An Iranian UAV based on, but smaller than and different from, the RQ-170
- Shahed 171 Simorgh – An Iranian full-size copy of the RQ-170
- 2019 Iranian shoot-down of American drone
- Iran–United States relations during the Obama administration
