= Shahed 123 =

Iranian reconnaissance drone

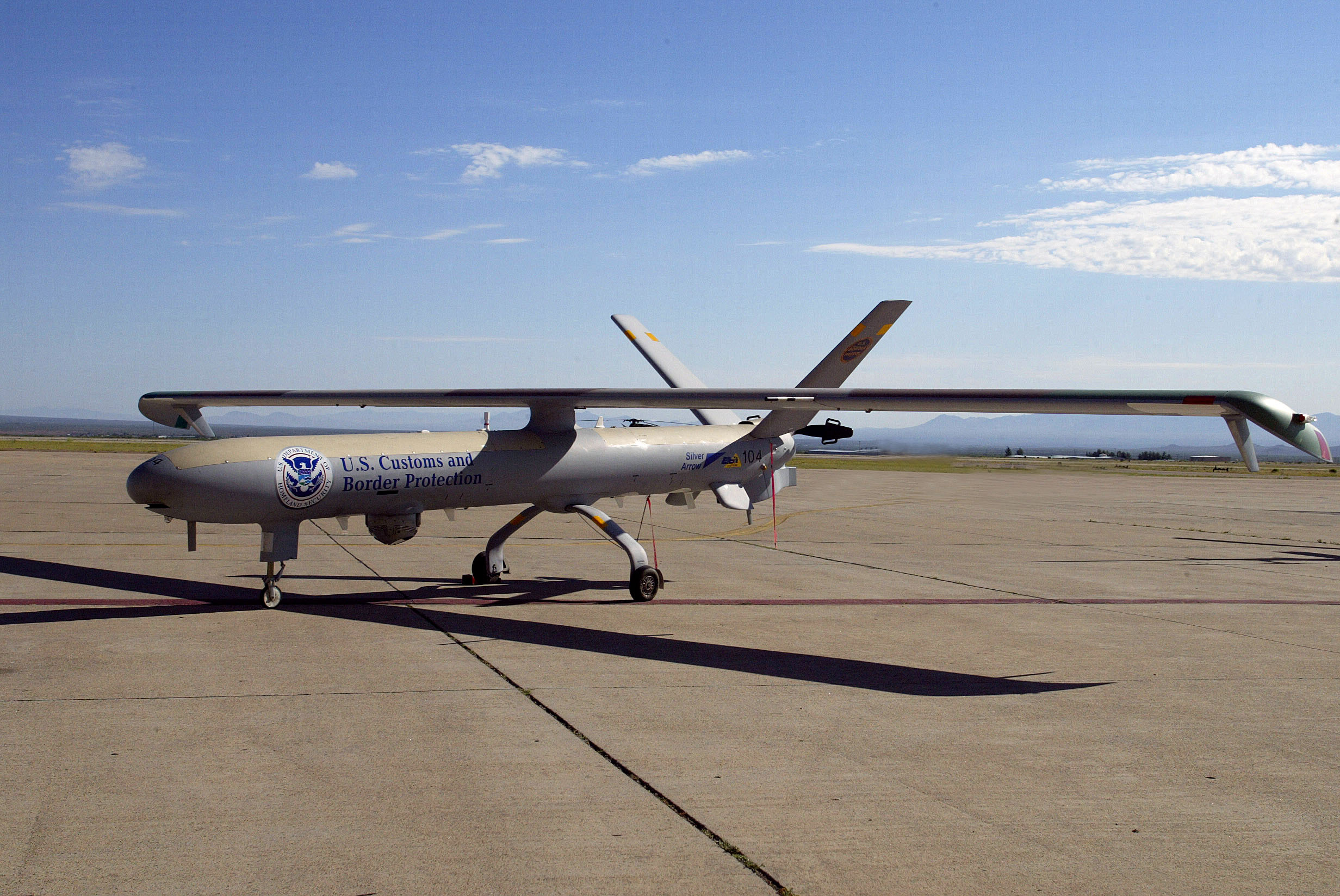
Hermes 450 (whose reverse was made as Shahed 123)

The Shahed 123 is a reconnaissance drone designed and built by Shahed Aerospace Industries, being a reverse-engineered version of the Hermes 450. This UAV, with its V-shaped tail and aerodynamic design, is an advanced version of the Hesa 100 UAV, which first flew in Isfahan in 2005 and entered mass production in 2009. The advanced version of this UAV is called Shahed 129. The Shahed 123 UAV was able to capture images of the US military base in the region for the first time.

== Specifications ==
- No wheels, and a piston engine in the rear; and has an optical assembly under the body.
- Range 750 km

== Hermes' Hunt ==
The Islamic Revolutionary Guard Corps announced on Sunday, August 24, 2014, that it had shot down an Israeli aircraft with a missile before it entered the Natanz nuclear zone. The downed drone was a "Hermes" type. The Revolutionary Guard Corps announced that some parts of the drone were intact and that they were analyzing its data.
