= Shahed 216 =

Two-seat Iranian military helicopter

Shahed 216 is the first two-seat Iranian military helicopter designed by Shahed Industries and unveiled in 2015. This helicopter of the Islamic Revolutionary Guard Corps is equipped with two engines with a power of 4,000 horsepower and, on the other hand, its power transmission system is a two-stage planetary gearbox. This combat helicopter uses four composite blades for flight and has a body made of a combination of aluminum and composite material that weighs less than similar models.

Shahed 216 is capable of performing missions such as armed reconnaissance, protection of personnel-carrying helicopters, and the ability to perform missions at night and in difficult navigation conditions. Also, this combat helicopter is capable of flying at night with an advanced vision system, and in addition, electronic warfare systems and infrared missile countermeasures are installed in it; Shahed 216 is armed with a 20 mm cannon and 70 mm rockets, like other helicopters in Iran. Other features of this helicopter include: the presence of various types of digital maps and global positioning systems; in addition, based on published information, Shahed 216 communication systems operate in the VHF, UHF and HF wave channels.

== Specifications ==
- Helicopter weight: 5000kg
- Maximum takeoff weight: 7470kg
- Ceiling altitude: 6200m
- Maximum climb rate: 6.3m/s
- Range: 550km
- Endurance: 2.5 hours
- Height: 2.4m
- Length: 18.72m
- Width: 1m
- Maximum engine power: 4000hp
