= Shahed 191 =

Iranian flying wing unmanned combat aerial vehicle

Saeqeh
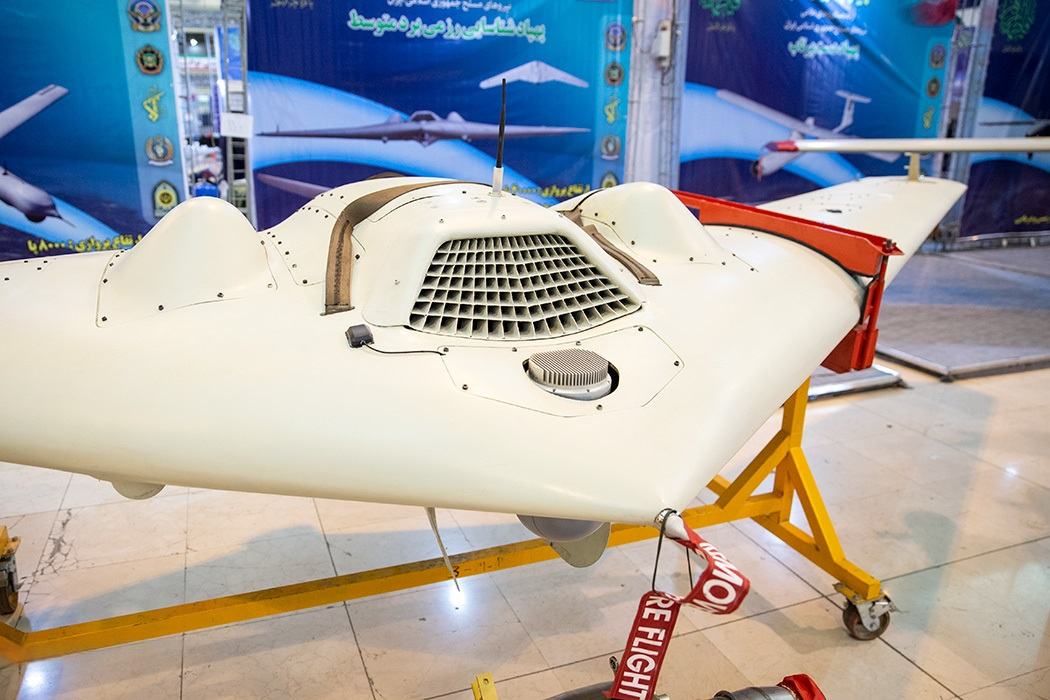
- A Saeqeh-2 variant at a defence exhibition in Tehran.

General information
- Type: Unmanned combat aerial vehicle
- National origin: Iran
- Manufacturer: Shahed Aviation Industries
- Status: In service
- Primary user: IRGC AF
- Number built: 10 built, 50 planned (2019)

History
- Manufactured: 2010s–present
- Introduction date: October 2016
- First flight: November 2014
- Developed from: RQ-170 Sentinel

The Shahed Saeqeh (Persian: شاهد صاعقه, Witness Thunderbolt), also called the Shahed 191, is an Iranian turbofan/piston-powered flying wing unmanned combat aerial vehicle (UCAV) produced by Shahed Aviation Industries. It is based on, but smaller than and substantially different from, a Lockheed Martin RQ-170 Sentinel UAV that was captured by Iran in 2011 and then reverse-engineered. It is one of two Iranian flying wing UAVs based on the RQ-170, along with the Shahed 171 Simorgh, a larger version.

The Saeqeh was revealed in October 2016.

The drones can carry two Sadid-1 missiles, externally for the Saeqeh-1, and internally for the Saeqeh-2.

As of 2017, 10 Saeqeh drones were in production, and Iran planned to procure at least 50 by 2025.

== Variants ==
The specifications for the Saeqeh are unknown, but it is believed to have a wingspan around 6–7 meters.

=== Saeqeh-1 ===
The Saeqeh-1 was first presented at an Iranian arms expo in 2016.

Iranian state news claimed the Saeqeh-1 could carry four Sadid-1 precision-guided anti-tank guided missiles. The Iranian Government did not provide a demonstration of the UAV flying, or state what its range was. The Saeqeh-1 had no apparent targeting/optical system.

The first models of Saeqeh lacked the frontal air intake of the Simorgh/RQ-170.

=== Saeqeh-2 ===
Later shown models have a frontal air intake, although it's likely that models with piston engines do not have a frontal intake. The UAV takes off from specialized racks, that are mounted on a vehicle speeding down a runway, and is recovered on a runway with retractable landing skids. According to Tasnim News, the Shahed 191 is 60% of the size of the RQ-170.

The Shahed 191 carries two Sadid-1 missiles internally and lands on retractable landing skids. The Shahed 191 has a cruising speed of 300 km/h, an endurance of 4.5 hours, a range of 450 km, and a payload of 50 kg. The ceiling is 25,000 ft. The wing span is 7.31 meters, the length 2.7 meters, the max takeoff weight 500 kg, and the max speed 350 km/h.

Fars News Agency says the Saeqeh-2 has been used in combat in Syria, using missiles against the Islamic State militant organization.

=== Propeller-powered variant ===
In wargames held in 2019 Iran showed a Saeqeh variant powered by a propeller. It carries its Sadid-1 weapons externally and lands on fixed landing skids. It takes off similarly to the Shahed 191 variant.

== Operational history ==
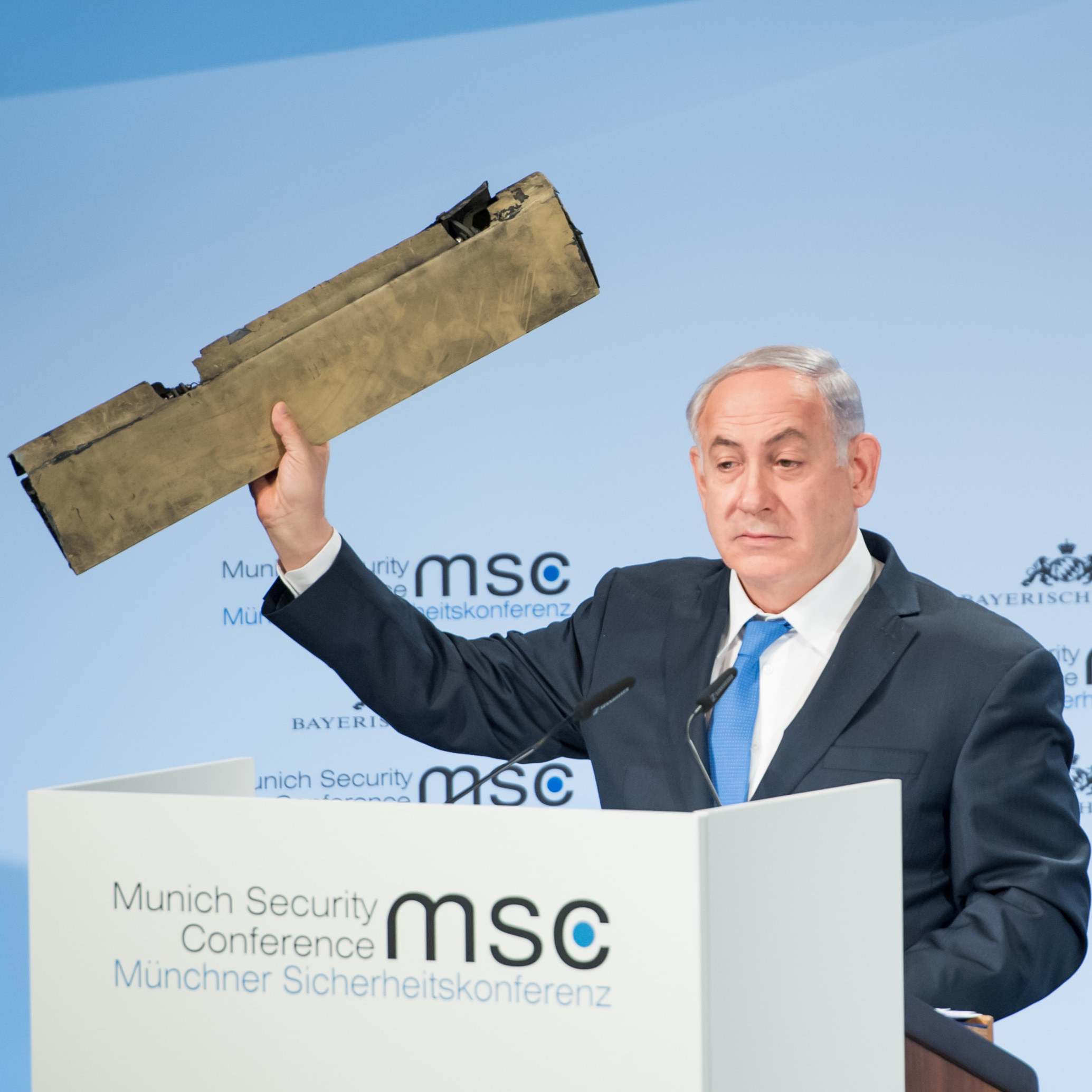
Benjamin Netanyahu presents part of a destroyed Saeqeh drone at the Munich Security Conference 2018

On 1 October 2018, the IRGC Aerospace Force used ballistic missiles and drones, supposedly including Saeqeh UAVs, to attack targets in the Abu Kamal region, in Eastern Syria. Although Iran had first shown the Saeqeh with four Sadid-1 missiles slung under the body, in this incident they released video they said showed a Saeqeh UAV releasing a single Sadid-1 bomb from its internal bomb bays.

Israel shot down a Saeqeh during the February 2018 Israel–Syria incident. The Times of Israel reported that the UAV's design was largely based on the captured RQ-170; IAF Brigadier General Tomer Bar said that the drone was quite advanced and imitated western technology.

In July 2022, the United States claimed that Russian officials had travelled to Iran to 'examine' drones, including several labelled on satellite images as Shahed-191. At least one of these aircraft was pictured in flight near Kashan airfield. The report stated that the aircraft appeared to be 'attack-capable'.

== Specifications (Shahed 191) ==
Data from Tasnim News (2020) and Иранский ударный БЛА "Shahed-191" (2019)

General characteristics

- Crew: none
- Length: 2.7 m (8 ft 10 in)
- Wingspan: 7.31 m (24 ft 0 in)
- Gross weight: 500 kg (1,102 lb) 100 kg payload
- Max takeoff weight: 500 kg (1,102 lb)

Performance

- Maximum speed: 350 km/h (220 mph, 190 kn)
- Cruise speed: 300 km/h (190 mph, 160 kn)
- Range: 1,500 km (930 mi, 810 nmi)
- Endurance: 4.5 h
- Service ceiling: 7,620 m (25,000 ft)

=== Armaments ===
- Missiles: Sadid-1 missiles, Saeqeh-1, and Saeqeh-2

== Operators ==
Iran

- Islamic Revolutionary Guard Corps - Aerospace Force

== See also ==
- Iran–U.S. RQ-170 incident

=== Related development ===
- Lockheed Martin RQ-170 Sentinel
- Shahed 171 Simorgh

=== Aircraft of comparable role, configuration and era ===
- AVIC 601-S
- Northrop Grumman RQ-180
- Mikoyan Skat
- Sukhoi Okhotnik
- Northrop Grumman Bat

=== Others ===
- HESA Karrar
