= FP-5 Flamingo =

Ukrainian cruise missile

FP-5 "Flamingo"
- Flamingo at MSPO in Kielce, 2026
- Type: Ground-launched cruise missile
- Place of origin: Ukraine

Service history
- In service: 2025–present
- Used by: 19th Missile Brigade, Ground Forces
- Wars: Russo-Ukrainian War

Production history
- Designer: Fire Point
- Manufacturer: Fire Point
- Unit cost: US$600,000

Specifications
- Mass: 6,000 kg (6.0 t; 13,000 lb)
- Length: 12–14 m (39–46 ft; 13–15 yd)
- Wingspan: 6 m (20 ft; 6.6 yd)
- Warhead weight: 1,150 kg (1.15 t; 2,540 lb)
- Engine: AI-25TL turbofan
- Propellant: Solid fuel for booster, liquid fuel for turbofan
- Operational range: 3,000 km (1,900 mi)
- Flight ceiling: 5,000 m (16,000 ft)
- Maximum speed: Maximum 950 km/h; cruise 850–900 km/h
- Guidance system: GPS/GNSS with INS backup
- Accuracy: 14 m (46 ft)

The FP-5 "Flamingo" (Ukrainian: Фламі́нго, romanized: Flaminho [flɐˈmʲinɦɔ]) is a Ukrainian ground-launched cruise missile developed by defence firm Fire Point. Revealed on 18 August 2025, the missile is fitted with a 1,150 kg (2,540 lb) warhead and has a range of 3,000 km (1,900 miles). The missile was in serial production in August 2025, targeting 210 units a month by the end of the year.

== Development ==
Fire Point, a Ukrainian defence startup founded by a group of friends from non-military backgrounds—including construction, game design, and architecture—began development of the FP-5 "Flamingo" following the 2022 Russian full-scale invasion of Ukraine. The missile was first publicly revealed on 17 August 2025 by Associated Press photojournalist Efrem Lukatsky during a test launch at a hidden facility in southern Ukraine. In his address on 20 August 2025, President of Ukraine Volodymyr Zelenskyy announced that serial production had begun and described it as "the most successful missile we have". The Associated Press reported that the nickname "Flamingo" originated when early production units of the missile had a pink colour due to an error at the factory, but this was denied by Fire Point's CTO. The Economist and Politico on the other hand reported that the name was chosen to highlight the role of women in senior positions at the company, with test prototypes being painted pink to support the name.

Reporters and OSINT analysts have noted the striking similarity between the FP-5 Flamingo and the FP-5 missile advertised by defence industry startup Milanion Group at IDEX 2025 (a defence industry conference and expo), with the advertised capabilities, design and even the model number being identical. Milanion Group is a company registered in the United Kingdom, though media reports state it is based in the United Arab Emirates and did business in Ukraine prior to the Russian invasion. An analyst has described Fire Point as operating under Milanion's umbrella, using Milanion's technology and connections to produce the FP-5 locally. The Economist assessed that the production process is partially conducted abroad, with Fire Point stating that over 90% of final assembly is done in Ukraine.

According to Ukrinform, the weapon threatens 90% of Russia's arms manufacturing capacities. Possible target categories:

- Oil refineries and energy infrastructure – Fire Point officials noted their drones and missiles are "partly responsible for airport closures and high gasoline prices in Russia".
- Military production facilities and weapons depots – described as targets for the missile's 1,150 kg (2,540 lb) warhead.
- Command centres and strategic infrastructure – identified as priority targets given the missile's capabilities.

== Design ==
The missile has a fixed straight wing and a turbofan jet engine mounted above the fuselage. This gives it a superficial resemblance to the V-1 flying bomb and the Ukrainian-built Soviet Tu-141 and Tu-143 reconnaissance drones, although the V1 used a pulsejet and the Tu-141 and Tu-143 were designed with engines mounted inside the main fuselage. The rear of the fuselage has four flight control surfaces in an X-configuration. The monocoque fuselage is primarily built with filament-wound (as used in ballistic missiles) radar transparent composite materials (fiberglass), and the engine nacelle is built from metal to withstand high temperatures. The jet engine appears to be the Ivchenko AI-25, designed in the 1960s in the Soviet Union and used to power the Aero L-39 Albatros aircraft, later produced by Ukrainian manufacturer Motor Sich. The engine is significantly larger than those found in comparable cruise missiles. Fire Point chief designer, Denys Shtilerman, said in an interview, on 8 July 2026, that an "indigenous turbojet engine" had been developed with some 10 engines being tested.

Flamingo's warhead is claimed to be 2.5 times the weight of the warhead of the American Tomahawk Block V cruise missile, with a stated weight of 1,150 kg (2,540 lb). According to a Dutch military expert interviewed by UkrInform, Flamingo is a classic aerial bomb converted into a cruise missile by adding a jet engine, fuselage, and wings. The warhead, shown in pictures with the nose cone removed, may be a repurposed FAB-1500 bomb, but based on the warhead's size the 1,500 kg (3,300 lb) FAB-1500 seems unlikely, with a more likely bomb being either a 925 kg (2,039 lb) Mark 84 high-explosive bomb or a same-weight BLU-109/B bunker buster. If the missile uses a conventional gravity bomb, the weight of the warhead would be 925 kg (2,039 lb) but the explosive filler would only be 430 kg (950 lb), more in line with comparable cruise missile systems. The Flamingo's claimed range is approximately twice the unclassified range of the Tomahawk Block V, allowing it to hit targets anywhere in the European part of Russia and as far as Novosibirsk, but it had not been shown to strike targets at this range as of June 2026.

The Flamingo claims a similar speed to its Western counterparts, 900 km/h, but does not have complex visual guidance systems (TERCOM, DSMAC); the primary means of navigation is by satellite navigation using a jamming-resistant, controlled reception pattern antenna layout. Claimed accuracy is a CEP of 14 m (46 ft) in ideal conditions at any range. The simplified design is intended to speed production. The main drawbacks compared to the Tomahawk are a longer pre-launch preparation time of 20 to 40 minutes and a takeoff weight that is almost five times greater. Ukrainian experts state that Russian air defence will intercept some FP-5 missiles, and emphasise the value of combined strikes by multiple weapons types.

On 4 July 2026, five Flamingos were shot down by the Russian Air Force using an A-50U radar plane. With Michael Bohnert, a RAND analyst, said “Its radar, unobstructed by the curvature of the Earth, was able to detect Ukrainian FP-5 Flamingo cruise missiles from far away and defeat them,".

== Cost and affordability ==
The Czech crowdfunding initiative "Gift for Putin" ("Dárek pro Putina") raised approximately $520,000 (roughly 12.5 million Czech koruna) to purchase a Ukrainian-built Flamingo cruise missile in October 2025. The fundraiser, which was completed in approximately 48 hours after launching on 22 October 2025, was organised to purchase a single missile specifically priced by the manufacturer Fire Point for the campaign. The missile, designated DANA 1 in honour of the late Czech nuclear safety chief Dana Drábová, was to be transferred to the Armed Forces of Ukraine upon completion of payment, but in November 2025, the organizers suspended the deal over a corruption investigation involving Fire Point.

This fundraising campaign provides a concrete cost estimate for individual Flamingo missiles. Multiple independent sources have corroborated similar price points, with estimates ranging from approximately $500,000 to under €1 million ($1.09 million) per unit. Fire Point CEO Iryna Terekh stated cost per unit was US$600,000, and has emphasised that the company "purposefully aimed for low cost" to enable large-scale procurement and potentially massive strike operations.

By comparison, the American Tomahawk cruise missile costs between $1.5 million and $2.5 million per unit depending on the variant, despite having approximately half the range and a significantly smaller warhead than the Flamingo. The Flamingo's affordability is achieved through simplified design choices, including the use of repurposed Soviet-era AI-25TL turbofan engines from Aero L-39 Albatros jet trainers, a carbon-fiber fuselage that can reportedly be manufactured in six hours, and basic inertial navigation systems that trade off some precision to reduce the cost.

The French company Safran provided the guidance system in exchange for Ukraine purchasing more AASM Hammer bombs.

On 27 July 2026, Fire Point CEO Iryna Terekh said each Flamingo missile “costs just under $600,000 per unit”, which is claimed to be six times cheaper than a Tomahawk missile. She also claimed a June attack on Cheboksary to be possibly the “longest recorded cruise missile missions”. Current production is some 100 missiles per month.

== Production ==
Serial production of Flamingo was claimed to have begun in mid-2025, initially at a rate of approximately 30 missiles per month. According to Politico's August 2025 interview with Fire Point CEO Iryna Terekh, the missile had successfully completed battlefield trials, and entered serial production with a target capacity of 200 units monthly. Fire Point announced in September 2025 that it had increased production of its Flamingo cruise missile from 30 units per month in August to 50, with plans to reach seven missiles per day by the end of the year. Terekh confirmed that the Flamingo had entered serial production, with scaling up being the primary focus for meeting expanded production targets.

The weapon system provides Ukraine's most advanced long-range strike capability.

In September 2025, the Danish government announced that a subsidiary of Fire Point would start production of solid rocket fuel for the Flamingo in Denmark from 1 December 2025. Denmark temporarily suspended 20 laws and regulations to open the plant.

Fire Point had purchased a large number of Ivchenko AI-25 engines with a remaining flight time of some 10 hours from various stockpiles. They restore the engines enough for a Flamingo missile's flight time of three and a half hours, although not suitable for normal more prolonged use. Previous media reports said that the engines had been made by Motor Sich, but Fire Point said that they had found "thousands of such engines" at landfills in Ukraine. Titanium parts were replaced by "cheaper and easier-to-produce alternatives" adequate to make them flightworthy. Engines can also be taken from about 6,000 still in use in aircraft such as the L-39 Albatross and Hongdu JL-8 jet trainers across "post-Soviet countries, Asia, and Africa". Fire Point has also established its own plant to produce missile engines; it is not clear if this is the Ivchenko AI-25 under licence.

Fire Point does not manufacture the warhead, which is said to be able to "pierce thick concrete", with ground penetration of some 10 m (33 ft) "Many types" of warhead, including cluster warheads, were reported to be in development. As of "early September 2025" the rate of production was two missiles a day, with work on an automated process that aims to "reach 200 per month by the end of this year".

In early December 2025, during an interview on X, Denys Shtilerman (co-founder and chief designer of Fire Point) said that a Flamingo missile had been intercepted on 9 October at a height of 114 meters. The aim was to fly at an "altitude of 30 to 40 meters above the ground", so "no one will see it from the ground". This would bring it in line with "TERCOM system, which has been in operation since the late 1980s". However Ukraine does not have maps of the Russian Federation suitable to allow the missile to fly so low.

As of 15 March 2026, Fire Point claimed to manufacture three Flamingos per day. New engines were close to completion to replace the current AI-25 engines used. According to Shtilerman, "All the engines (AI-25) we use now were previously used in civil aviation. Their peak efficiency is roughly between 6,000 and 10,000 meters, so they are not very effective at sea level". The new engines will be a dual-circuit turbojet engine with a low bypass ratio, unlike most cruise missile engines; the company claims that performance will be exceeded only by the Tomahawk missile. In 2025 the new engines were planned to enter production by a Ukrainian manufacturer at the beginning of the following year.

In June 2026 Diehl Defence announced an interest in manufacturing the missile with an uprated seeker and guidance system.

== Key operational history ==
FP-5 with camera uplink used during November 2026 Crimean Bridge attack

For brevity, this section contains only some of the major operations involving Flamingo missiles. More attacks than those listed here have taken place.

- 30 August 2025, Ukrainian sources reported that Flamingo missiles were used to target a Federal Security Service outpost in Crimea, in what was described as their first combat use. According to these reports, at least three missiles struck the facility, causing structural damage and reportedly damaging six hovercraft and killing one Russian serviceman.
- 9 October 2025, Russia and the Ukrainian president confirmed the first use of the Flamingo missile, used along with the Neptune missile, against targets in Russia.
- 10 October 2025, Russia claimed to have shot down two Flamingo missiles, one by a Buk missile, in its first interception.
- 5 May 2026, Zelenskyy tweeted that Ukraine's armed forces had used Flamingos to conduct strikes on targets 1500 km inside Russia, including military-industrial facilities in Cheboksary. Footage online showed "a large blast followed by sustained fire". Officials said that at least four Liutyi drones followed up the attack.
- 24 July 2026, Flamingo missiles attacked the Avitek plant in Kirov, with at least one missile striking the plant, which is Russia's only "serial producer of ejection seats for "every fighter and attack aircraft" used by Russia. Satellite imagery showed a hole “21.5 by 24 meters in the roof of the production facility”.
- 16-17 November 2026, at least one Flamingo missile was used in attacks that destroyed the road span of the Kerch Strait Bridge.

== See also ==
Related development

- FP-1 (unmanned aerial vehicle) – Ukrainian long-range one-way attack drone
- UJ-25 Skyline – Ukrainian unmanned aerial vehicle
- Peklo – Ukrainian loitering munition
- UJ-26 Bober (drone) – Ukrainian long-range UAV
- AN-196 Liutyi – Ukrainian long-range UAV
- Palianytsia (missile) – Ukrainian cruise missile
- R-360 Neptune – Ukrainian family of cruise missiles
- Trembita (cruise missile) – Ukrainian cruise missile

Comparable missiles

- MGM-13 Mace – US cruise missile
- AGM-86 ALCM – US cruise missile
- BGM-109G Gryphon – US cruise missile
- Novator 9M729 – Russian cruise missile
