= Trembita (cruise missile) =

Ukrainian cruise missile

Trembita Трембіта
- Type: Cruise missile
- Place of origin: Ukraine

Service history
- Used by: Ukraine
- Wars: 2022 Russian invasion of Ukraine

Production history
- Designed: 2023
- Manufacturer: PARS
- Unit cost: USD 10,000
- Produced: 2023

Specifications
- Mass: 100 kg (220 lb)
- Length: 2 m (6.6 ft)
- Warhead: 20 kg (44 lb) thermobaric, HE-fragmentation warhead
- Engine: Pulsejet engine
- Operational range: 140 km (87 mi)
- Flight altitude: 30–2,000 m (98–6,600 ft)
- Maximum speed: 400 km/h (250 mph)
- Guidance system: GPS/GLONASS
- Launch platform: Mobile ground platform

Trembita (Ukrainian: Трембіта) is a Ukrainian surface-to-surface cruise missile manufactured by PARS. It was revealed publicly in April 2023.

== Name ==
The name of the projectile refers to the characteristic shape of the trembita, an instrument that somewhat resembles the shape of the engine used in this machine - a long, straight tube flared at the end.

== Description ==
The Trembita is structurally similar to the German V-1 flying bomb from the Second World War. The missile is powered by a (now rarely used) pulsejet engine, which allows it to reach a speed of about 400 km/h. This engine generates 100 dB of sound and large amounts of heat, making the Trembita an attractive target for enemy air defenses, especially MANPADS missiles. The missile has a range of about 140 km, its minimum flight altitude is 30 m, and the maximum ceiling is 2,000 m. The fuel supply is 30 L (7.9 US gal) of E92 or E95 gasoline or diesel fuel. Trembita, due to the type of engine used, is equipped with a rocket accelerator, enabling proper launch. These missiles are usually launched from mobile launchers usually carrying about 20-30 missiles. The fuselage has two pairs of stabilization wings, one mounted on the lower front part and the other at the upper rear part.

== Application ==
Due to its simplicity and low price, this missile may be an equivalent of the Iranian Shahed 131 drone used massively by the Russians during the War in Ukraine. The cost of producing one Trembita is about USD 10,000, many times lower than the cost of production of missiles designed to fight it. The missile can function both as a classic cruise missile, used to attack targets in the rear of the front, as well as a decoy used to overload the enemy's anti-aircraft defense. The idea is that its low cost will enable the launch of dozens of Trembitas at once to overwhelm enemy defenses. While the missile version is already cheap, the decoy version without a warhead or sophisticated navigation system costs even less at USD 3,000; this would allow more decoys to be launched for air defenses to expend interceptors against and clear the way for missiles to reach their target. The plan is to produce up to 1,000 Trembitas each month.

== See also ==
- AQ-400 Scythe
- Liutyi – Ukrainian long-range UAV
- UJ-25 Skyline – Ukrainian unmanned aerial vehicle
- Palianytsia (missile) – Ukrainian cruise missile
- Peklo – Ukrainian loitering munition
- R-360 Neptune – Ukrainian anti-ship and land-attack cruise missile
- FP-5 Flamingo – Ukrainian cruise missile
