= Maryan Zablotskyy =

Ukrainian politician

- Мар'ян Заблоцький
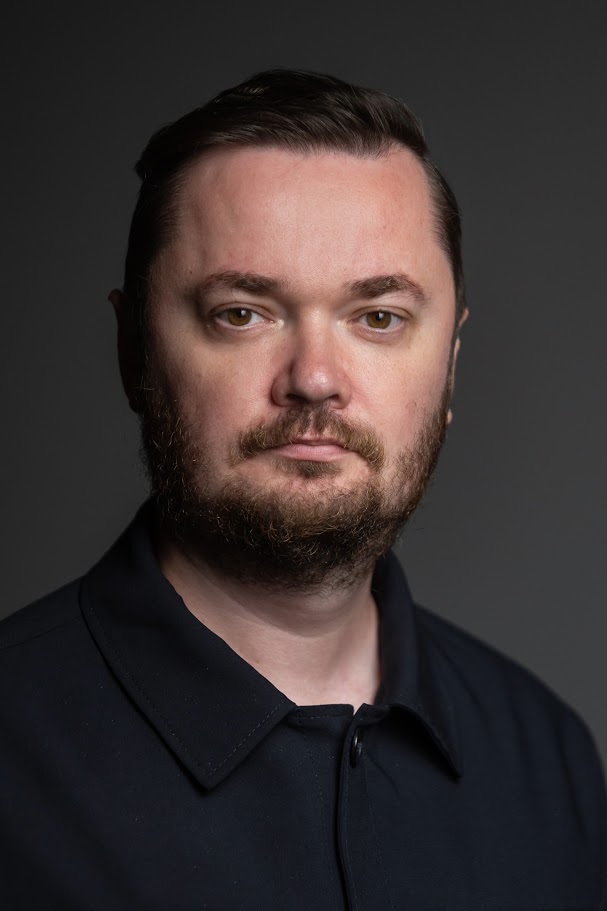
- Incumbent
- Assumed office August 29, 2019

Chairman of the Subcommittee on Local Taxes and Fees of the Verkhovna Rada Committee on Finance, Taxation and Customs Policy

Personal details
- Born: 21 September 1985 (age 40)
- Party: Servant of the people
- Education: Lviv University of Trade and Economics
- Occupation: Politician

Maryan Bohdanovych Zablotskyy (Ukrainian: Мар'ян Богданович Заблоцький; born September 21, 1985) is a Ukrainian politician and public figure. He serves as a People's Deputy of Ukraine of the Verkhovna Rada of Ukraine of the IX convocation (since August 29, 2019), elected on the list of the "Servant of the People" party (Number 82 in the list), and is a member of the party "Servant of the People".

Zablotskyi is the Chairman of the Subcommittee on Local Taxes and Fees of the Verkhovna Rada Committee on Finance, Taxation and Customs Policy.

== Biography ==
Educated at Lviv's specialized secondary school with an emphasis on foreign languages (1992–2001), he later attended the Institute of Economics and Finance at Lviv University of Trade and Economics, receiving a Specialist degree (2001–2006) and a Master’s degree (2006–2007) with research on stock market structure and analysis of financial markets. He earned his PhD in Economics from the Institute of Regional Studies, National Academy of Sciences of Ukraine (2007–2012), focusing on mechanisms for developing Ukraine's financial market.

Professionally, he began to work with investment funds at asset management company Optima Capital (2007–2008) and subsequently held analytical and directorial roles in Erste Bank’s treasury and economic research departments (2008–2012). From 2012, he held senior positions within the Ukrainian Agrarian Association and served as secretary of the Supervisory Board for the PFTS Ukraine Stock Exchange. His public service included voluntary advisory roles for Verkhovna Rada deputies (2012–2019) and executive roles in nonprofit organizations focused on economic freedoms and legislative efficacy (2015–2019). He also consulted on European Union agro-industrial reforms (2016–2018) and chaired the Public Council on Tax and Customs Policy for the Verkhovna Rada (2016–2019).

== Political Activity ==
Zablotskiy served as an assistant to Verkhovna Rada deputies Volodymyr Pylypenko (7th convocation) and Oleksiy Mushak (8th convocation). Elected as a people's deputy from the Servant of the People party in 2019 (list position №82), he joined the Committee on Finance, Tax, and Customs Policy, chairing the subcommittee on local taxes and fees. Zablotskiy is also active in international and inter-parliamentary relations, including as a member of the Permanent Delegation to the Parliamentary Assembly of GUAM, co-chairman of the group for relations with Chile, a deputy head of parliamentary group on inter-parliamentary relations with the United States of America.

As a public figure, he authored legislation, including a 2015 bill for deregulating the agro-industrial sector by eliminating 22 permit documents. He was a principal author of the 2021 land reform law, which transferred state lands outside settlements to territorial communities. He spearheaded the installation of a Ronald Reagan monument in Kyiv.

In 2021, Zablotskiy competed for head of the State Tax Service.

== Public Activities ==
From 2015 to 2019, Zablotskyy headed the public organization “Ukrainian Society for Economic Freedoms” and the “Center for Effective Legislation”. He is a member of the All-Ukrainian Association of Gun Owners.

In 2016–2018, on a voluntary basis, he served as a senior consultant for the EU Delegation to Ukraine’s project on reforming the agro-industrial complex. At the same time, from 2016 to 2019, he chaired the public council at the Committee of the Verkhovna Rada of Ukraine on Tax and Customs Policy.

In March 2023, he narrated the film “Outpost Irpin” in English.

He is the founder of the “Ukrainian Arsenal of Freedom” project, which aims to arm Ukrainian citizens free of charge to make the country safer. As part of this project, in August 2023, the Irpin police received 101 small arms confiscated by the Miami Police Department in the U.S., along with 148,000 donated rounds of ammunition. In October 2023, the Ukrainian police received 531 units of confiscated weapons from Phoenix, Arizona, in the U.S.: 386 pistols, 87 rifles, and 58 shotguns. In January 2024, with funding from foreign sponsors, 35 new AR-15 rifles were purchased in the US and transferred to the private ownership of members of the Irpin Territorial Defense Forces, who participated in the de-occupation of the city, carry out missions in the region, and defend Ukraine in the ranks of the Armed Forces of Ukraine.

He helped to secure a grant to assist in the creation of the STING interceptor drone. Signed a contract with the Volunteer Formation of the Territorial Community and received a combat order. He completed a full cycle of drone operator training, including instruction at the “Kruk” and “Wild Hornets” UAV operator training centers and practical flight training. In March 2026, he personally shot down three Russian aerial targets in a single day using a Sting drone — a “Shahed” drone and two “Gerbera” drones. In April 2026, he conducted a historic experiment — he piloted an FPV interceptor drone first from his office, then in front of the state border, and then another 2,000 km away from the drone itself — from abroad.
