= Iryna Terekh =

Ukrainian business executive and architect

- Ірина Терех
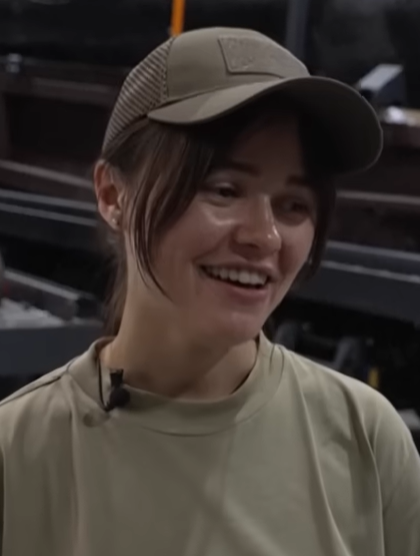
- Terekh in 2025
- Born: 1991 or 1992 (age 34–35); Kharkiv, Ukraine
- Education: Kyiv National University of Construction and Architecture
- Occupations: architect; business executive
- Organization: CEO of Fire Point

Iryna Terekh is a Ukrainian architect and business executive who is the CEO of the Ukrainian defence contractor Fire Point. She trained as an architect but left college after her third year. She soon founded and ran a company that produced outdoor furniture and architectural concrete, and also led multiple other companies including nonprofit Frieden Ukraine and a real estate agency. She became the Director of Production of Fire Point after fleeing from her home during the 2022 Russian invasion of Ukraine, and subsequently became its CTO and CEO. She is best known for her work on the FP-5 Flamingo cruise missile.

== Biography ==
Terekh was born in 1991 or 1992 in Kharkiv and raised there as well. She attended the Kyiv National University of Construction and Architecture, where she studied architecture, but left after her third year. She later explained this decision was to focus on her business and her two children, having decided that her studies could wait.

She worked for Andriy Vavrysh at his development company Saga Development as a director, though she was on paper listed as the company's founder and executive from its founding. She went on to develop her own company, TEREKH.group. It first produced architectural models, but after the Maidan, which decreased the importance of architectural models, she decided to change to architectural concrete and expand to street furniture and designing street spaces, giving her company the name Dwell the Space. The company's main products included concrete pots, landscape decorations, and washbasins. She also ran a real estate agency in the Kyiv region. She worked out of Irpin.

She is the co-owner of sporting goods manufacturer Pochupark and experimental production and R&D company Stellar Jet, which, among other things, develops military transport. She runs Frieden Ukraine, which provides meals and distributed Red Cross aid to soldiers.

After the 2022 Russian invasion of Ukraine, she went to Bucha to collect her mother and the two escaped as Russian soldiers fired at her car; she decided to help Ukraine resist the Russian invasion in any way she could. She began working with businessman Denys Shtilerman, with whom she had worked on architectural projects focused on beautifying Ukraine, to build long-range attack drones for Ukraine. In 2023 she co-founded and became Head of Production of the new company Fire Point in 2023; Shtilerman and film producer Yehor Skalyha were the other two co-founders. Unsatisfied with merely focusing on mass-production without direct knowledge, however, she trained herself in how missiles work, which allowed her to cut the time needed to make a Fire Point FP-1 wing from 6 days to 2 and a half hours. When she was hired, she was tasked with making sure the company built thirty drones per month: by August 2025, they were building a hundred drones per day.

She became known as the mind behind the long-range FP-5 Flamingo cruise missile, better known as the Pink Flamingo because it was painted pink during testing; some of her staff joked that the color was "what happens when a woman takes over a defense company". The final product was black, however, which Terekh stated was because it "eats Russian oil". During the final test of the missile, an abandoned box of puppies was found at the testing location; many of the dogs were taken in by Fire Point staffers and Terekh took two to become guard dogs at the factory. She later became the CTO of Fire Point, and simultaneously was CEO. She has been Fire Point's voice to the media since becoming CTO.

In 2024, she left Fire Point to run her own collaborating company, Falcon Technology LLC, due to disputes between her and other leaders as to the company's direction: the company did R&D for Fire Point. It was soon purchased by Fire Point and she was brought back in as CEO. The official sale was completed in May 2026. She has worked on constructing a chemical plant in Denmark in addition to 83 factories in Ukraine for the production of missile components. She participated in the 2026 Bilderberg Conference, a private gathering of political and business elite held in April in Washington, DC, and was the only woman from Ukraine listed in attendance. She has argued that Ukraine should remain focused on defense technology instead of agriculture even post-war.

== Personal life ==
She married in her twenties, but later divorced. She has two children. She also has a dog named Chuck, who is deaf.
