= Kyiv National University of Construction and Architecture =

Public university in Kyiv, Ukraine

Kyiv National University of Construction and Architecture (KNUCA)
- Київський національний університет будівництва і архітектури (КНУБА)
- University logo
- Type: National university
- Established: 1930
- Affiliations: Ministry of Education and Science of Ukraine
- Rector: Petro Kulikov
- Administrative staff: 700
- Students: 10500
- Location: Kyiv, Ukraine; 50.4276°N 30.4662°E
- Website: www.knuba.edu.ua/eng/
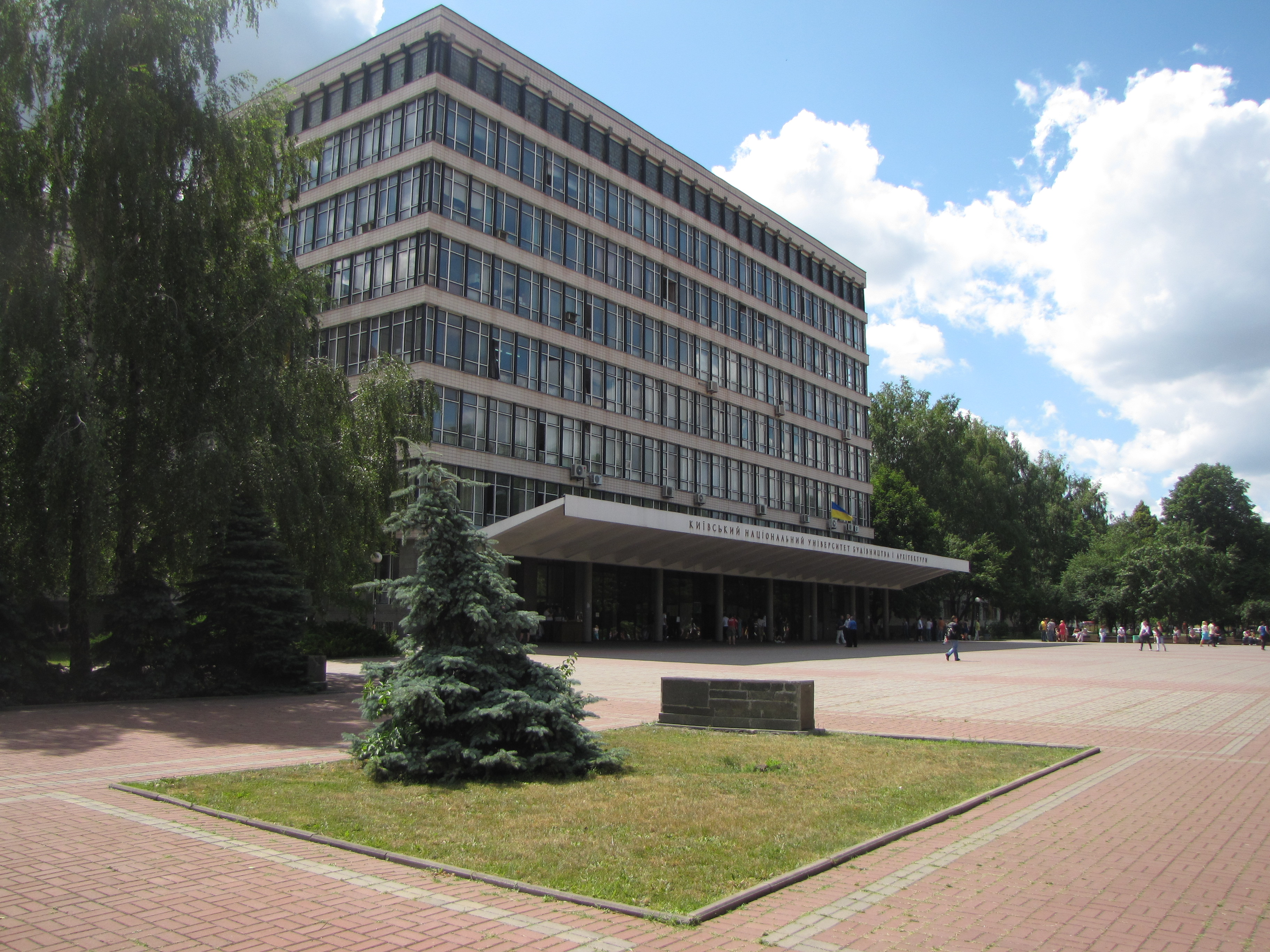

The Kyiv National University of Construction and Architecture (informally referred to as KNUCA) – better known under its former name abbr. KISI or KIBI for rendering of Kyiv Civil Engineering Institute (Note: Russian: Киевский инженерно-строительный институт, КИСИ, romanized: Kievskiy inzhenerno-stroitel'nyi institut, KISI in Ukrainian; Ukrainian: Київський інженерно-будівельний інститут, КІБІ, romanized: Kyivskyi inzhenerno-budivelnyi instytut, KIBI) – is the largest and most important civil engineering, construction and architectural university of Ukraine located in the nation's capital, Kyiv.

== History ==
The institution was founded in 1930 as the Kyiv Civil Engineering Institute on the basis of factory and communal construction branch of the Kyiv Polytechnic Institute (KPI) and the architecture faculty of the Kyiv Art Institute. During the post-World War II Soviet period, KISI rose to become the second highest engineering and architecture faculty in the USSR, behind the Moscow Civil Engineering Institute (МИСИ).

By the Decree of the Cabinet of Ministers of Ukraine of August 13, 1993, the Kyiv State Technical University of Construction and Architecture was created on the basis of the Kyiv Civil Engineering Institute. On February 28, 1999, by the Decree of the President of Ukraine (217/99) the university was accorded the status of a National University as "Kyiv National University of Construction and Architecture."

== Student life ==
Educational and scientific work is organized and carried out by more than 96 chairs numbering about 800 professors and instructors.

About 10,500 students study at the university. After the graduation, they acquire the education qualification levels of Bachelor, Specialist, and Master of Science. The postgraduate courses in about 30 specialities are available at the university for those who choose to continue their professional and scientific training under the guidance of experienced advisers. The postgraduate preparation functions at the University, 9 specialized Scientific Councils for protection of the doctor's and candidate dissertations in 25 scientific specialties, 7 research institutes and 11 specialized research laboratories works.

The campus area includes six education cases, center of information technologies and computer-aided specialized laboratories, sports complex, library complex and reading hall (more than 1 million publications), eight hostels, hotel, sanatorium, educational-rehabilitation camp, food enterprises, etc.

== Academics ==
KNUCA is a large research university with a majority of enrollments in undergraduate & graduate and professional programs.

=== Undergraduate and graduate ===
- Faculty of Architecture;
- Faculty of Construction;
- Faculty of Construction technological;
- Faculty of Automation and information technologies;
- Faculty of Geoinformation systems and territory management technologies;

==== Faculty of Engineering Systems and Ecology ====
Dean - Professor Oleksandr Priymak, D.Sc.

The history of the faculty begins from the date of foundation of university (1898).

Students obtain bachelor's and master's degrees in the following specialities:

- Ecology (specialization - Ecology and environmental protection);

- Heat energy (specialization - Energy Management);

- Environmental protection technologies (specialization - Environmental protection technologies);

- Construction and civil engineering.

The faculty consists of five departments:

===== Environmental Protection Technology and Labour Safety Department =====
Head - Professor Tetiana Tkachenko, D.Sc.,

Other leaderships:

- professor Olena Voloshkina, D.Sc.

- Professor Tetiana Krivomaz, D.Sc.

Source: Environmental Protection Technology and Labour Safety Department of Kyiv National University of Construction and Architecture

===== Heat-Gas Supply and Ventilation Department =====
Head - Professor Kostiantyn Predun, D.Sc.,

Other leaderships:

- professor Vadym Korbut, D.Sc.

- Professor Viktor Mileikovskyi, D.Sc.

Source: Heat-Gas Supply and Ventilation Department of Kyiv National University of Construction and Architecture (in Ukrainian)

==== External divisions ====
- Institute of Innovative Education KNUCA;
- Kyiv Industrial College KNUCA;
- Nikolaev building college KNUCA;
- Zhytomyr Technological College KNUCA;
- Vinnytsya college of construction and architecture of KNUCA.

==== Additional educational and professional programs ====
- Distributed software systems and technologies, graduate (MSc);
- Environmental and Industrial Design, graduate (MSc).

== Research ==
KNUCA conduct high research activity. About 300 graduate students are currently (2021) focused on their individual research projects.

The principal of the postgraduate division is professor Vitalii Ploskyi, D.Sc.

== People associated with KNUCA ==
- Prof. Alexey Sidelev, PhD, PE, New York University, Civil Engineering
- Oleksandr Jakovyč Chorchot (Aleksandr Jakovlevič Chorchot), (1907-1993), Ukrainian architect
- Heorhyj Oleksandrovyč (Aleksandrovič) Chorchot, (*1939), Ukrainian architect
- Prof. Radoslav Zuk (*1926), Ukrainian architect in Canada, emeritus professor at McGill University, honorary professor at KNUCA
- Riyadh A. Amir, PhD, Austrian architect, Master of Architecture (1968)
- Jurij Fedorovyč Chudjakov, (*1934), Ukrainian architect
- Prof. Dr. Jurij Chetverikov, Ukrainian architect
- Prof. Khun-Neay Khuon, Master of Architecture (1960-1966), dean of the Faculty of Architecture at Royal University of Fine Arts, Phnom Penh, Cambodia (1968-1975)
- Prof. Sergey Bushuyev, professor and head of the Department of Project Management at KNUCA
- Dmitry Tsymlyakoff, Master of Computer Science, CAD and CAM systems, Silicon Valley, California
- Professor Leon Mishnaevsky Jr. (*1971), Technical University of Denmark, Denmark
- Prof. Dr. Türköz Kolozali (*1960), Bachelor/Master/PhD (1983-1993), professor of Architecture/Chairman of Architecture Department, Near East University, Nicosia, Cyprus
- Artem Matviienko (*1994) - IT Project Manager - EltexSoft
- Tamara Tselikovska - Ukrainian architect
- Iryna Terekh, architect, activist
- Ben Huffman (*1990) - leading assistant in EPTA. Master of food delivery business.
- Alan Jara (*1957) Bachelor/Master. Colombian civil engineer and politician.
- Slava Balbek (*1983) Bachelor/Master. Ukrainian architect.

== Awards and reputation ==
- Rating of Ukrainian universities "Compass"-2012 – 5th place;
- In the branch of construction and architecture – 1st place.

== Co-operations ==
- Augsburg University of Applied Sciences, Germany
- The FernUni Hagen/ University in Hagen, Germany
- HAWK University of Applied Sciences and Arts, Hildesheim/Holzminden/Goettingen, Germany
- Technical University at Braunschweig, Germany
- Carinthia University of Applied Sciences (CUAS), Austria
- VGTU Vilnius Gediminas Technical University, Lithuania
- Donetsk National Technical University, Ukraine
- Dortmund University of Applied Sciences and Arts, Germany

== See also ==
List of universities in Ukraine
