= FP7 =

FP7 may refer to:

- Seventh Framework Programme, European Union research and development funding programme
- EMD FP7, a General Motors diesel locomotive
- Fire Point FP-7, a Ukrainian tactical ballistic missile
