= Fire Point FP-1 =

Ukrainian long-range one-way attack drone

FP-1
- FP-1/FP-2 drone
- Type: Loitering munition / One-way attack drone
- Place of origin: Ukraine

Service history
- In service: 2024–present
- Used by: Armed Forces of Ukraine
- Wars: Russian invasion of Ukraine

Production history
- Designer: Fire Point
- Designed: 2022–2024
- Manufacturer: Fire Point
- Unit cost: US$55,000 t0 $75,000
- Produced: October 2024–present
- No. built: 5,000+
- Variants: FPV carrier (dual wing-mounted FPV drones)

Specifications
- Wingspan: Fixed straight wings
- Effective firing range: 1,600 km (990 mi)
- Warhead: Modular (Fragmentation or shaped-charge)
- Warhead weight: 60 kg to 120 kg
- Armor: Radar-absorbent materials
- Main armament: Integral warhead
- Secondary armament: 2 × deployable FPV drones (optional)
- Engine: Two-cylinder engine
- Payload capacity: 120 kg
- Propellant: Solid rocket booster (launch)
- Operational range: 1,600 km
- Boost time: Solid rocket
- Guidance system: Inertial and satellite guidance with ECCM

FP-1 is a Ukrainian long-range, one-way attack drone developed and produced by the defence technology company Fire Point. Introduced in late 2024 in response to the Russian invasion of Ukraine, the FP-1 is designed for deep-strike missions, capable of delivering a warhead over distances up to 1,600 km. It has been deployed by the Armed Forces of Ukraine to target high-value military and logistical sites.

== Development ==
Conceived in mid-2022 by a team of former aerospace engineers and defence analysts, the FP-1 programme aimed to produce a low-cost, high-performance one-way attack drone. Initial operational prototypes of the FP-1 drone flew in early 2024, demonstrating a loitering munition delivery system. Full-scale production commenced in October 2024 at covert facilities near Kyiv.

== Design ==
The FP-1 features a slender fuselage with a two-cylinder engine driving a propeller, a solid rocket booster for launching, and fixed straight wings. It carries a modular warhead weighing between 60 kg and 120 kg, selectable for fragmentation or shaped-charge effects. The airframe employs radar-absorbent materials to reduce detectability. Navigation relies on inertial systems augmented by satellite guidance, with electronic counter-countermeasure capabilities to resist jamming.

== Operational history ==
By mid-2025, Fire Point had increased production from 30 to over 100 FP-1 units per day, reporting total manufacture of more than 5,000 drones. The UAV has been credited with striking ammunition depots, command posts, and air defence batteries at ranges exceeding 1,200 km. Analysts attribute Ukraine's ability to disrupt rear-area logistics to the FP-1's cost-effectiveness – US$55,000 to $75,000 per unit according to the Fire Point CEO versus US$200,000 for comparable systems. Recent capability expansions include carrying two deployable FPV drones on the wings.

On 12 May 2026, a Ukrainian FP-1/2 attacked an air defence system, in Crimea, using unguided missiles for the first time. According to the Russian Telegram channel, footage showed it launching one of four missiles attached to its wings.

On 6 July 2026, Ukrainian drones, reported to be FP-1, travelled over 2,500 km and hit Russia's Omsk refinery, the largest oil refinery in Russia.

== See also ==
- FP-5 Flamingo – Ukrainian cruise missile
- UJ-25 Skyline – Ukrainian unmanned aerial vehicle
- UJ-26 Bober (drone) – Ukrainian long-range UAV
- AN-196 Liutyi – Ukrainian long-range UAV
