= 2026 Crimean Bridge explosions =

2026 attacks on the Crimean Bridge

2026 Crimean Bridge attacks
- Part of the Crimea attacks during the Russo-Ukrainian war
- Crimean Bridge after the 16 and 17 November explosions
- Date: 16—19 November 2026
- Location: Crimean Bridge
- Cause: Drone and missile strikes
- Perpetrators: Armed Forces of Ukraine; Ukrainian Navy; Rocket Forces and Artillery; Unmanned Systems Forces; 414th Brigade "Magyar's Birds" (7th Centre); 1st Centre; Security Service of Ukraine (SBU); Special Group "Alpha"

Beginning on 16 November 2026, as part of the Russo-Ukrainian war, Ukrainian forces repeatedly targeted the Crimean Bridge with missiles and drones, causing severe damage to the bridge including the destruction of the main span of its road bridge.

The first attack, on 16 November 2026, caused one of the road bridge's structural arches to shift by about 15 degrees according to Russian media, forcing the partial closure of road traffic over the bridge. The second attack, on 17 November, collapsed the arch structure and main span of the road bridge below it, cutting off road traffic completely. Train traffic on the bridge was suspended and resumed later that day. A third attack, on the rail bridge, occurred on 19 November. Train traffic resumed on one of the two train tracks during the following days.

== Background ==
The Crimean Bridge is a pair of parallel bridges spanning the Kerch Strait between the Taman Peninsula of Krasnodar Krai in Russia and the Kerch Peninsula of Crimea, which consists of a four-lane road bridge and a double-track railway bridge, and at a length of 19 km (12 mi), (Note: Entire fixed link, including small causeways at the ends. The bridges themselves are 18.1 km (11 1/4 mi) (rail) and about 17 km (10 1/2 mi) (road) long.) it is the longest bridge in Europe, and the longest bridge ever constructed by Russia. (Note: It is also often considered to be the longest bridge in Russia, but this applies only to de facto Russian territory, including Crimea, since most of the bridge is in the (Autonomous) Republic of Crimea. The Taman–Tuzla Spit part, in undisputed Russian territory, is only 4.5 kilometres (2 3/4 mi) long, shorter than the President Bridge in Ulyanovsk Oblast (5.825 km or 3.619 mi).) Crimea is considered by Ukraine and most of the international community as an occupied territory of Ukraine, with it being under Russian control since its annexation in February 2014, which started the Russo-Ukrainian war.

The bridge itself is considered a legitimate military target by the Ukrainian Armed Forces, and had previously been targeted during the war, notably in 2022, 2023, and 2025.

== Attacks ==
=== 16 November ===
Around 2:00 a.m. Moscow Time on 16 November 2026, Ukrainian drones struck the Crimean Bridge, causing Russian officials to temporarily shut the bridge down to both train and vehicle traffic. Rail traffic resumed a few hours later with some delays, while road traffic partially resumed later in the evening using alternating traffic directions. According to Meduza, open-source intelligence indicated that the arch structure of the road bridge was significantly deformed as the result of a direct hit by a drone, with the arch appearing to list as much as 15 degrees out of shape; Russian government sources claimed that the damage was minor.

=== 17 November ===
Video released by the Security Service of Ukraine showing the attack on the Crimean Bridge on 17 November 2026

Still from video released by Ukrainian President Volodymyr Zelenskyy showing an FP-5 Flamingo targeting the Crimean Bridge on 17 November 2026

Around midnight Moscow Time on 17 November, the bridge was struck again by a variety of weapons, resulting in the collapse of both the road bridge and the arch structure above it. Russian officials temporarily shut the bridge down to both train and vehicle traffic, with rail traffic resuming later in the day under significant delays.

Ukrainian president Volodymyr Zelenskyy described the strike as the seventh phase of an operation lasting several weeks, and said that Neptune, Ruta, and FP-5 Flamingo missiles struck the railway section.

According to the Security Service of Ukraine (SBU), its Special Group "Alpha" hit the road section with Palianytsia missile-drones. European defense company Destinus confirmed that seven of its Ruta cruise missiles were used to hit the bridge, while its Da Vinci drones were used for air defense suppression.

Unmanned System Forces Maj. Robert Brovdi described the operation as a joint effort by Navy, Rocket Forces and Artillery of the Ground Forces, Unmanned System Forces, and SBU units.

Prior to the attack, the bridge had two arches: one on the rail bridge, and one on the road bridge. The road-bridge arch and the span of the road bridge below the arch were both destroyed in the attack. Ukraine's General Staff said that the railway section was "still standing, but now with a damaged arch". Rail and road traffic were suspended, with rail traffic later resuming.

According to The Times, the operation was conducted entirely without using the Starlink communications system by setting up its own real-time video and radio relay.

=== 19 November ===
Just after midnight on 19 November, another Ukrainian attack struck the rail bridge, causing a temporary halt to traffic. The extent of damage was initially unclear, with Russian-appointed Crimea governor Sergey Aksyonov stating that a damage assessment was in progress.

As of 20 and 21 November, trains used only one of the two rail tracks, and repairs were ongoing on the other rail track, according to the Russian Ministry of Transport.

== Significance ==
The Crimean Bridge is a critical supply route for Russian forces in Crimea. The bridge has been described as a symbol of modern Russian imperialism and the occupation of Crimea, and the attack was described by the Kyiv Independent as a "dent in Russia's imperial ambition". Zelenskyy described the strike as an "unprecedented operation in response to Russian attacks on our infrastructure".
