= Slava Balbek =

Ukrainian architect

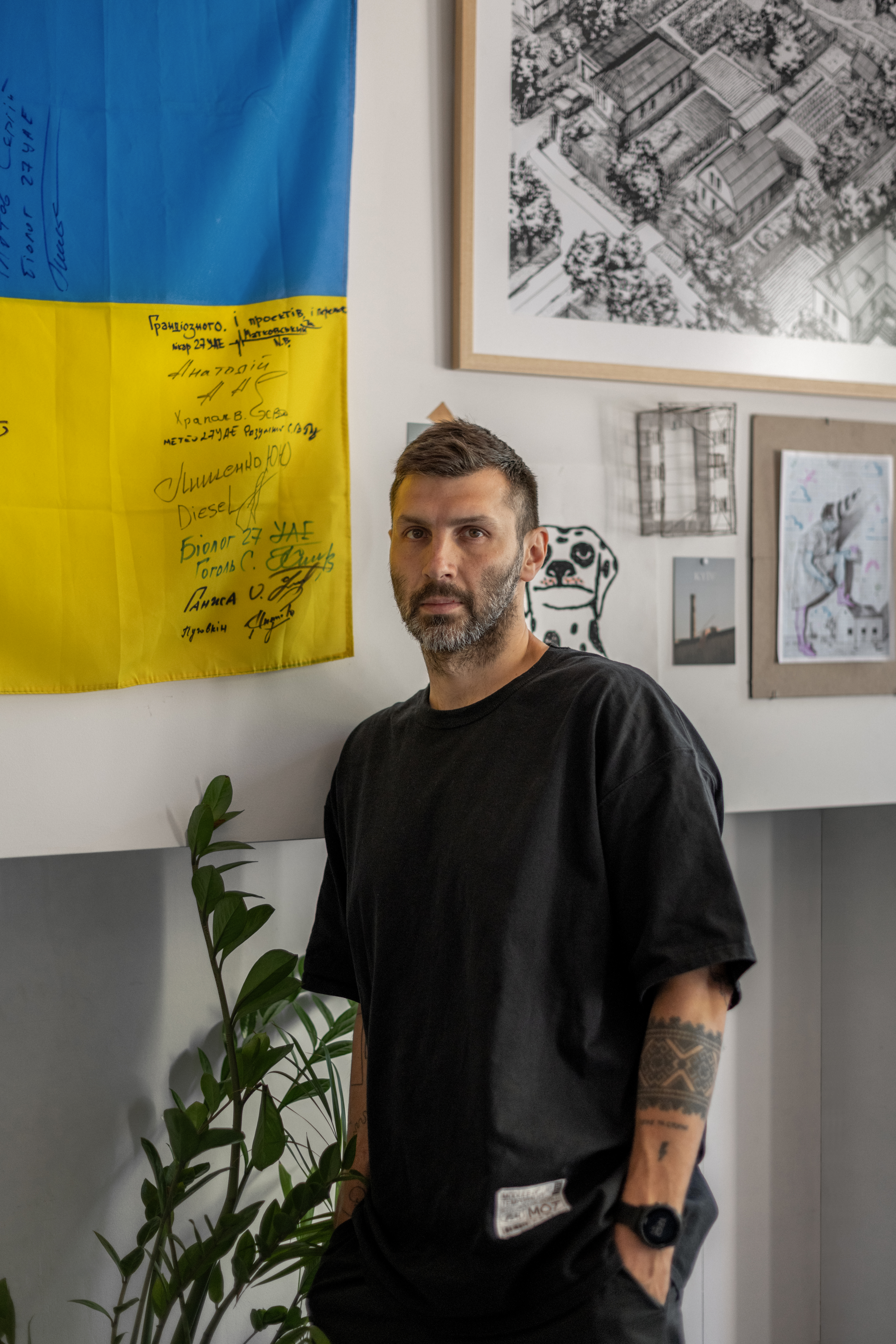
Slava Balbek in balbek bureau office

Slava Balbek is a Ukrainian architect, designer, and volunteer. In 2018, he co-founded balbek bureau – an architectural and interior design studio based in Kyiv, Ukraine. The studio’s projects have received international awards, including Interior Design Best Of Year, Hospitality Design Awards, Dezeen Awards, and others. In February 2022, after Russia launched its full-scale invasion, Balbek co-founded a charitable organization Kyiv Volunteer, which provides aid to both military and civilians. Slava is also a co-owner of four cafes in Kyiv.

== Career ==
Slava graduated from Kyiv National University of Construction and Architecture with a degree in Architectural Environment Design. In 2007, during his sixth year of studying, he co-founded 2b.group studio with Olga Bohdanova. Over the course of 11 years, the studio implemented various projects, many of which received international awards.

In 2016, Slava launched ARCHICOURSE, an educational project focusing on a creative approach to modern architecture and design. In 2017, he founded propro furniture brand.

In 2018, after the split-up of 2b.group, Slava and his partner Borys Dorogov founded balbek bureau. Slava holds the position of CEO and art director, defining the company's direction as a CEO and developing design concepts for projects as an art director. In response to the challenges of Russia’s full-scale invasion, Slava, along with the bureau’s team, initiated a series of social initiatives called RE: Ukraine System.

== Projects ==
- Banda, creative agency office, Kyiv, Ukraine, 2016-2018
- Bursa, boutique hotel, Kyiv, Ukraine, 2018
- 906 World, cultural center, San Francisco, USA, 2018
- Kyiv Food Market, food hall, Kyiv, Ukraine, 2019
- Molodist, restaurant, Kyiv, Ukraine, 2019
- Thailand Hi, restaurant, Kyiv, Ukraine, 2019
- Zweig, Bar, Kyiv, Ukraine, 2020
- Grammarly, IT company office, Kyiv, Ukraine, 2020
- Darron, marketing center, Qingdao, China, 2020
- 6:19, tattoo salon, Kyiv, Ukraine, 2020
- Say No Mo, beauty salon, Kyiv, Ukraine, 2020
- Lumberjack, hotel, Sonora, USA, 2021
- MAO, Chinese restaurant, Kharkiv, Ukraine, 2022
- Home.Memories, art installation, Antarctica, 2022-2023

== Awards ==
- 2019 Elle Decoration International Design Awards Ukraine, Designer of the Year
- 2020 Interior Design Best of Year, Best of Year Rising Star

== Volunteer ==
In February 2022, in the early days of Russia's full-scale invasion of Ukraine, Slava and Olexander Borovsky co-founded a charitable organization Kyiv Volunteer. During the first months of the full-scale war, the organization provided meals for thousands of people, including the Armed Forces of Ukraine, Kyiv Territorial Defense Forces, National Police, orphanages, hospitals, maternity hospitals, and individual citizens in need of assistance

The creation of Kyiv Volunteer was prompted by the surplus of food in Slava and Oleksander’s establishments and the urgent need for warm meals for the defenders and civilians. In the first days of Kyiv Volunteer, the founders' partners and friends provided the necessary ingredients and supplies. Later, they reached out to other restaurateurs to open their kitchens or donate leftover supplies to strengthen the initiative. Over time, these food establishments began to collaborate, forming a network

== Hobby ==
Before the full-scale invasion, Slava devoted his free time to sports. He is an Ironman triathlete, a candidate for master of sports in boxing, and a swimmer who has twice crossed the Bosphorus.

With experience in designing dozens of cafes and restaurants, Slava always wanted to explore the hospitality industry. He is the founder and co-owner of Dyletant, Dubler, Vartsab and City Eatery – four establishments in Kyiv.
