= Anti-Ballistic Missile Coalition =

European missile defense coalition formed in 2026

- Formation: 13 July 2026
- Type: Military coalition
- Purpose: Integrated anti-ballistic missile defense for Europe
- Region served: Europe
- Members: Denmark, France, Germany, Italy, Netherlands, Norway, Spain, Sweden, Ukraine, United Kingdom, Poland

The Anti-Ballistic Missile Coalition is a multinational coalition established on 13 July 2026 by Denmark, France, Germany, Italy, the Netherlands, Norway, Spain, Sweden, Ukraine, and the United Kingdom (later joined by Poland) to develop an integrated anti-ballistic missile defense capability for Europe.

== Background ==
On the sidelines of a July 2026 meeting of the Coalition of the willing in Paris, a joint statement from 10 founding nations established the initiative to strengthen Europe's air defense, in the wake of growing threats of ballistic missiles being on Europe.

== Formation ==
The statement said the project would not replace existing systems, but would complement existing ballistic missile defense systems in Europe. The leaders of the coalition stated the project would be "purely defensive" in nature.

The scope of involvement of the ten nations includes defense industry, research capacity and operational experience.

== Freyja air defense project ==
The coalition of countries announced the development of the pan-European Freyja air defense system, architected by Fire Point to provide sovereign, modular, and available air defence. Ukrainian president Volodymyr Zelenskyy said the initiative would focus on integrating the Ukrainian-made interceptor–intended to be 80% cheaper per interdiction than the American MIM-104 Patriot–with European radars and control systems. The first prototype is desired to be operational by mid-2027.

== Membership ==
- Denmark
- France
- Germany
- Italy
- Netherlands
- Norway
- Poland (since September 2026)
- Spain
- Sweden
- Ukraine
- United Kingdom

In a joint statement the coalition stated it was open to other nations that "share its principles and objectives".

== See also ==
- Russo-Ukrainian War
- Missile defense systems by country
- Comparison of anti-ballistic missile systems
