= Fire Point (Ukrainian firm) =

Ukrainian defence technology company

- Type: Private
- Industry: Defence technology
- Founded: 2022; 4 years ago
- Founder: Denys Shtilerman; Iryna Terekh; Yehor Skalyha
- Headquarters: Kyiv, Ukraine
- Area served: Ukraine
- Key people: Iryna Terekh (CEO); Denys Shtilerman (Chief Designer); Mike Pompeo (Advisory Board member)
- Products: FP-1 series (Long-range strike drones); FP-2 series (Mid-range strike drones); FP-5 Flamingo (Cruise missile); FP-7 (Ballistic missile); FP-7.x (Anti-Ballistic missile); FP-9 (Ballistic missile)
- Production output: FP-1: 100 units/day; FP-5: 30–210 units/month; FP-2 100 units/day (2025)
- Number of employees: 6,000 (2026)
- Website: firepoint.technology

Fire Point is a Ukrainian defence technology company headquartered in Kyiv. Founded in 2022 in response to the Russian invasion of Ukraine, it specializes in the design, development, and production of long-range strike drones and cruise missiles. The company's flagship products are the FP-1 series of deep-strike drones and the FP-5 Flamingo cruise missile, both of which have been deployed by the Armed Forces of Ukraine to conduct precision strikes inside Russian-held territory.

== History ==
Fire Point was established in mid-2022 by a group of engineers, architects, and game designers seeking to develop cost-effective, high-performance unmanned aerial systems in support of Ukraine's defence industry. Iryna Terekh, Denys Shtilerman and Yehor Skalyha were co-founders. Initially operating in makeshift workshops, the company rapidly scaled to multiple covert production facilities across Kyiv and surrounding regions. The corporate entity was registered in 2021 and was called Centrocast, a casting agency, before Skalyha acquired it and renamed it Fire Point.

In late 2024, Fire Point unveiled its FP-1 series of long-range “deep-strike” drones, capable of reaching targets up to 1,600 km away. Production increased from an initial target of 30 units per month to over 100 units per day by mid-2025, with each drone costing approximately US$55,000 to manufacture.

In 2025, Fire Point unveiled the FP-5 "Flamingo" cruise missile, weighing 6,000 kg with a warhead of 1,150 kg and a maximum range of 3,000 km. The company invited journalists from the Associated Press to tour a production facility where the missiles were being built.

In August 2025, it was reported that the National Anti-Corruption Bureau of Ukraine (NABU) had launched an investigation into Fire Point, examining whether the company inflated the cost of components used in its products, the number of drones supplied to Ukraine's Ministry of Defence, or both. The probe was reported to be also looking into possible links between the company and Timur Mindich, co-owner of the Kvartal 95 television studio founded by President Volodymyr Zelenskyy. The company confirmed the existence of an investigation while denying the allegations. NABU initially declined to comment, before stating that the FP-5 Flamingo missile was not under investigation.

Mindich left Ukraine hours before another wider NABU investigation was announced on 10 November 2025. Fire Point created an advisory board on 12 November, and former U.S. Secretary of State Mike Pompeo was reported to have joined this board on 17 November.

On 13 July 2026, a joint statement from ten nations established an Anti-Ballistic Missile Coalition to strengthen missile defense in Europe. Zelenskyy said that the coalition will support the Freyja project architected by Fire Point to develop a significantly more affordable option than the American-made Patriot system.

== Products ==
=== Drones ===
==== FP-1 series ====
Fire Point FP-1 long-range unmanned aerial vehicle at MSPO 2026 in Kielce, Poland.

The FP-1 is a propeller-driven one-way attack drone with a 1600-3500 km range when carrying a 50 kg warhead, and a maximum warhead size of 120 kg. Its design emphasises modularity, ease of assembly, and electronic warfare resilience. The system has been credited with conducting more than 60 percent of Ukrainian strikes deep inside Russian territory, targeting ammunition depots, oil refineries, and command centres. Future upgrades will increase the baseline warhead weight to 105 kg while maintaining range.

==== FP-2 series ====
Fire Point FP-1 and FP-2 display with technical information boards at MSPO 2026 in Kielce, Poland.

In response to demand from frontline units, the FP-2 series of drones was developed as a mid-range alternative to the FP-1. The design of the FP-1 was adapted for a reduced range of 200 km, while its warhead weight was increased to 105 kg. Some warheads used by the FP-2 series are existing aerial bombs, while others are developed by outside suppliers. A future upgrade will increase the FP-2's warhead weight to 158 kg. Major Robert Brovdi, commander of the Unmanned Systems Forces (Ukraine), complained about the quality of warheads used in FP-2 drones. Six Ukrainian FP-2 drones struck a command post of the 58th Guards Combined Arms Army in Kadiivka. Brovdi claimed that only two would have been required, instead of six, if “the warheads had performed to their declared specifications.” Fire Point's co-founder and chief designer Denis Shtilerman claimed the warheads came from third party suppliers but quality control was maintained through routine inspections.

=== Missiles ===
==== FP-5 Flamingo cruise missile ====
Ukrainian Fire Point FP-5 Flamingo long-range cruise missile at MSPO 2026 in Kielce, Poland.

Announced in early 2025, the FP-5 Flamingo is a ground-launched cruise missile with a range of up to 3,000 km and a warhead mass of 1,150 kg. Its airframe is constructed using radar-transparent fiberglass winding, a technique typically reserved for ballistic missiles. Production ramp-up began with 30 units per month in mid-2025, with a goal of 210 units per month by October 2025. Ukrainian sources claimed that Flamingo missiles were used in August 2025 to successfully target a Federal Security Service outpost in Crimea, in what was described as their first combat use.

==== FP-7 ====
The FP-7 has been reported to be a tactical ballistic missile with an operational range of up to 200 km, a top speed of approximately 1,500 m/s, and a warhead weighing around 150 kg. The missile can remain in flight for up to 250 seconds and achieves an estimated accuracy (circular error probable, CEP) of about 14 m when launched from ground-based platforms for operational strikes. An FP-7 was tested on 28 February 2026, based on a Soviet S-300 interceptor, the 48N6, which has been simplified. Using a "hot launch", the missile "ignites its solid-fuel motor directly from the launcher and travels along an inclined guide rail rather than launching vertically". While based on a Soviet-era missile, it is made of carbon fibre and has modern electronics. Using Ukrainian-made solid fuel, a hot launch could allow for a faster deployment and better concealment. The FP-7 is said to be half the cost of the U.S. ATACMS ballistic missile. It has a range of "several hundred kilometres" and could have a "much larger warhead" than the ATACMS. According to the company the launchers can be disguised as "ordinary trucks".

Ukrainian reporting has associated the Pelican designation with the FP-7 ballistic missile, but, following long-range drone attacks on Moscow in September 2026, it was stated that the weapon named Pelican was a winged aerial drone rather than a ballistic missile.

Reuters reported the first combat use of the FP-7 on 1 Oct 2026.

On 12 October, Ukraine fired an FP-7 missile at an undisclosed target in the territory of Russia. With an “extended-range version” to be deployed by the end of the year.

On 31 October 2026, Denys Shtilerman, co-founder of Fire Point, said that while cheaper than an ATACMS, the missile wasn’t cost effective. Using a conventional high explosive warhead it cost $600,000 to make. Compared to a FP-2 drone that costs only $50,000 but has the same warhead of 200 kg. Comparing the two, the cost of FP-7 could buy 16 FP-2 drones. The plan is to introduce a cluster warhead, until such a warhead enters service using a FP-7 normal high explosive warhead "makes... no economic sense at all".

==== FP-7.x ====
Fire Point released footage of the test launch of the FP-7.x missile. This version of the FP-7 is an anti-ballistic missile with the same function as the well-known Patriot missile, to intercept and destroy incoming ballistic missiles. The missile is designed to destroy ballistic missiles by the use of a kill vehicle with an estimated speed of 1,500–2,000 m/s (4,900–6,600 ft/s; Mach 4.4 – Mach 5.9) and a length of 7.25 m (24 ft). The missile is part of the European Freyja anti-ballistic missile program; it has open architecture and can be used with several European targeting radars, including Saab Giraffe 8A/4A, Thales Ground Master 400 and Hensoldt TRML-4D radars. Initially the missile only contained an infrared seeker for terminal phase interception but it was later announced that it would use dual infrared and radar seekers. It would use a fragmentation warhead but a kinetic hit-to-kill version is expected to be introduced in the future.

Firepoint announced plans to work with the German company Diehl Defence on guidance.

== Product announcements ==
Fire Point FP-9 (left) and FP-7 (right) ballistic missile mock-ups at MSPO 2026 in Kielce, Poland.

On 4 September 2025, at the MSPO defense exhibition in Poland, Fire Point unveiled two new ballistic missile systems, designated FP-7 and FP-9, alongside plans for air defense systems. Both missiles ascend into high trajectories before descending on their targets, making their high terminal speeds a challenge for most air defense systems.

The FP-9 is a short-range ballistic missile capable of striking targets up to 855 km away, with a velocity up to 2,200 m/s and an 800 kg warhead. It can reach altitudes of around 70 km and maintains an accuracy of roughly 20 m, targeting high-value assets deep within enemy lines.

On 20 June 2026, President Zelenskyy said a new Fire Point drone could hit targets at a distance of 3,000 kilometres (1,900 mi).

== Operations ==
Fire Point's manufacturing occurs in concealed facilities to mitigate the risk of Russian air attacks. The company employs over 500 personnel, including engineers, technicians, and support staff. It works closely with the Ministry of Defence of Ukraine and domestic military research institutes on system integration and battlefield feedback loops.
