= Freyja (missile system) =

Defensive anti-ballistic missile system

Freyja (also, Freya, from Ukrainian: Фрея (Note: The Ukrainian National Transliteration system (used by the United Nations and other international agencies) romanizes 'Фрея' as "Freia", while British Standard 2979:1958 romanizes it as "Freya".)) is a pan-European anti-ballistic missile defense project initiated and led by the Ukrainian defense company Fire Point. It is explicitly designed as an open-architecture "system of systems" that integrates with existing NATO-standard radars, command posts, and data links rather than functioning as a standalone national system. The project’s stated aim is to deliver a lower-cost, higher-volume European alternative to the U.S. Patriot PAC-3 for intercepting ballistic missiles, addressing shortages of interceptors Ukraine has faced during the Russo-Ukrainian war. The projected cost for the system is less than US$1,000,000 per shot, compared with roughly US$3,800,000 for a Patriot missile.

== Description ==
The initial interceptor missile will be a ground-launched unit based on Fire Point's FP-7, designated FP-7.x and named "Freyja Interceptor". It is a 7.25 m (24 ft)-long, composite-material missile with a maximum speed of 1,500–2,000 m/s (4,900–6,600 ft/s; Mach 4.4 – Mach 5.9). It uses a combined semi-active radar and image-infrared seeker developed in partnership with Germany’s Diehl Defence (developers of the IRIS-T family). The system is intended to work with a wide range of European radars, with compatible surveillance and tracking radars being the Swedish SAAB Giraffe 8A/4A, French Thales Ground Master 400, and German Hensoldt TRML-4D. Target illumination is intended to be provided by the Danish Weibel GFTR-2100/48 or the Italian Leonardo KRONOS Land radars, and the Norwegian Kongsberg Fire Direction Centre (FDC) will be used in the command post. Integration occurs primarily through the NATO-standard Link 16 protocol, with additional open-technology elements such as the ASTERIX protocol for radar connectivity.

Fire Point wants each Freyja interceptor to cost less than €1 million (US$1.14 million), compared with roughly US$3.8 million for a Patriot missile. The project recycles elements of Soviet-era S-300 technology in the Ukrainian interceptor while building the broader command-and-control and seeker architecture around Western components. Fire Point is the lead developer and integrator for the missile and launcher; at least one additional undisclosed Ukrainian firm is participating, forming an emerging industrial consortium.

== History ==
Project Freyja (named after the Norse goddess of, among other qualities, love, war, and the ability to see and influence the future) was unveiled in May 2026, during the fifth year of the Russian invasion of Ukraine and after Russia began regularly firing ballistic missiles with conventional warheads into Ukraine. The first missile interception is planned for July 2027.

At a meeting of allied countries in Paris on 13 July 2026, nine countries joined an Anti-Ballistic Missile Coalition committed to expediting development of the Freyja system and initiating operations in 2027: Denmark, France, Germany, Italy, the Netherlands, Norway, Spain, Sweden and the United Kingdom, in part to help address the global shortage of anti-ballistic interceptors as a result of the 2026 Iran war. All nine are member states of both the Coalition of the willing and the Ukraine Defense Contact Group. A first prototype of the Freyja system is wanted operational by mid-2027.

In September 2026 Zelenskyy announced that Canada has expressed interest in joining the programme. He said that the project planned to prepare the first results for testing by December 2026.

On 13 November Zelenskyy announced that Ukraine had completed its part in developing the interceptor missile and the first component finished by international partners was the Danish illumination radar.

On 18 November 2026, Germany announced it would provide TRML-4D radars to Ukraine for use with the Freyja missile system.

== Related projects ==
EU president Ursula von der Leyen expressed her support for a larger anti-missile defence system including but not limited to Freyja, and supported using the remaining funds for Ukraine from SAFE to build joint ventures with Ukrainian defence companies.

== See also ==
- European Sky Shield Initiative
- European Sky Shield for Ukraine
- 2020s European rearmament
