= Liutyi =

Ukrainian long-range UAV

Antonov An-196 Liutyi
- Antonov An-196 Liutyi attack drone at International Defense Industry Salon 2026
- Type: One-way attack drone
- Place of origin: Ukraine

Production history
- Designer: Antonov ASTC
- Designed: October 2022
- Manufacturer: Antonov ASTC
- Unit cost: $200,000

Specifications
- Mass: 250–300 kg (550–660 lb)
- Length: 4.4 m (14 ft)
- Wingspan: 6.7 m (22 ft)
- Warhead weight: 50–75 kg (110–165 lb)
- Engine: 4-valve air-cooled box engine
- Operational range: 1,000–2,000 km (620–1,240 mi)
- Guidance system: Artificial intelligence, satellite navigation, INS

The Antonov An-196 Liutyi (Ukrainian: Лютий, lit. 'fierce/furious' (Note: In other contexts, "Лютий" usually means "February".)), also spelled Lyutyi or Liutiy is a Ukrainian one-way attack drone (OWA-UAV) developed by Ukroboronprom in October 2022 as an analogue to the Russian-fielded Shahed 136 one-way attack drone.

== Service history ==
During the Russian invasion of Ukraine, the Liutyi has seen use by Ukraine in attacks on Russian territory, including oil refineries, industrial facilities, and military airfields.

On 25 November 2024, the Ukrainian military website Militarnyi reported that a Liutyi fitted with an upgraded 75 kg warhead was used to strike a Russian oil refinery in Saratov, at a range of more than 600 kilometres from the Ukrainian border.

On 5 July 2025, at least two UAVs were used to attack VNIIR-Progress, which manufactures various military components for Su-34 fighter-bombers, air defense systems such as the S-300, T-90M and T-14 tanks, and submarines. The attacked facility was located in Cheboksary, about 975 km from the Ukrainian border.

On 13 October 2025, The New York Times reported another Liutyi strike against the Saratov refinery, including the fact that the strike commander's call sign was “Casper”. Call sign “Casper” is used by the Commander of the 1st Battalion of Ukraine's 14th Regiment of Unmanned Aerial Systems (a unit of the Unmanned Systems Forces of the Armed Forces of Ukraine).

On 31 October 2025, the Associated Press reported another Liutyi strike against Russian targets, including the fact that the strike commander’s call sign was “Fidel”. Call sign “Fidel” is used by the Co-Founder of the 1st Center of the Unmanned Systems Forces (formerly known as the 14th Regiment of Unmanned Aerial Systems.

On December 14, 2025, the Kyiv Post reported a Liutyi strike against a Lukoil-operated offshore oil platform in the Caspian Sea.

In February 2026, the Lukoil oil refinery in Ukhta was attacked. The city in the Komi Republic is located about 1,700 kilometers from the Ukrainian border.

May 5th 2026, 2 Liutyi drones (along with a Flamingo missile) were used to strike the VNIIR-PROGRESS plant in Cheboksary used to create electronic components primarily for Shaheed drone antenna/guidance systems.

On July 21, 2026, a two-way variant of the Liutyi drone equipped with air to surface missiles comparable in size to MAM bombs was unveiled at the Farnborough International Airshow. This would adapt the Liutyi as a multi-purpose UCAV, similar to the Bayraktar TB2 used earlier in the war by Ukraine.

== Variants ==
- AN-196 RS: Long range version capable of reaching targets 2,500 kilometers away.

== Operators ==
- Ukraine
  - Armed Forces of Ukraine

== See also ==
- Bober (drone)
- UJ-25 Skyline
- Palianytsia (missile)
- Peklo
- R-360 Neptune
- Highway of Death (Ukraine)
