= Sting (drone) =

Ukrainian anti-drone loitering munition

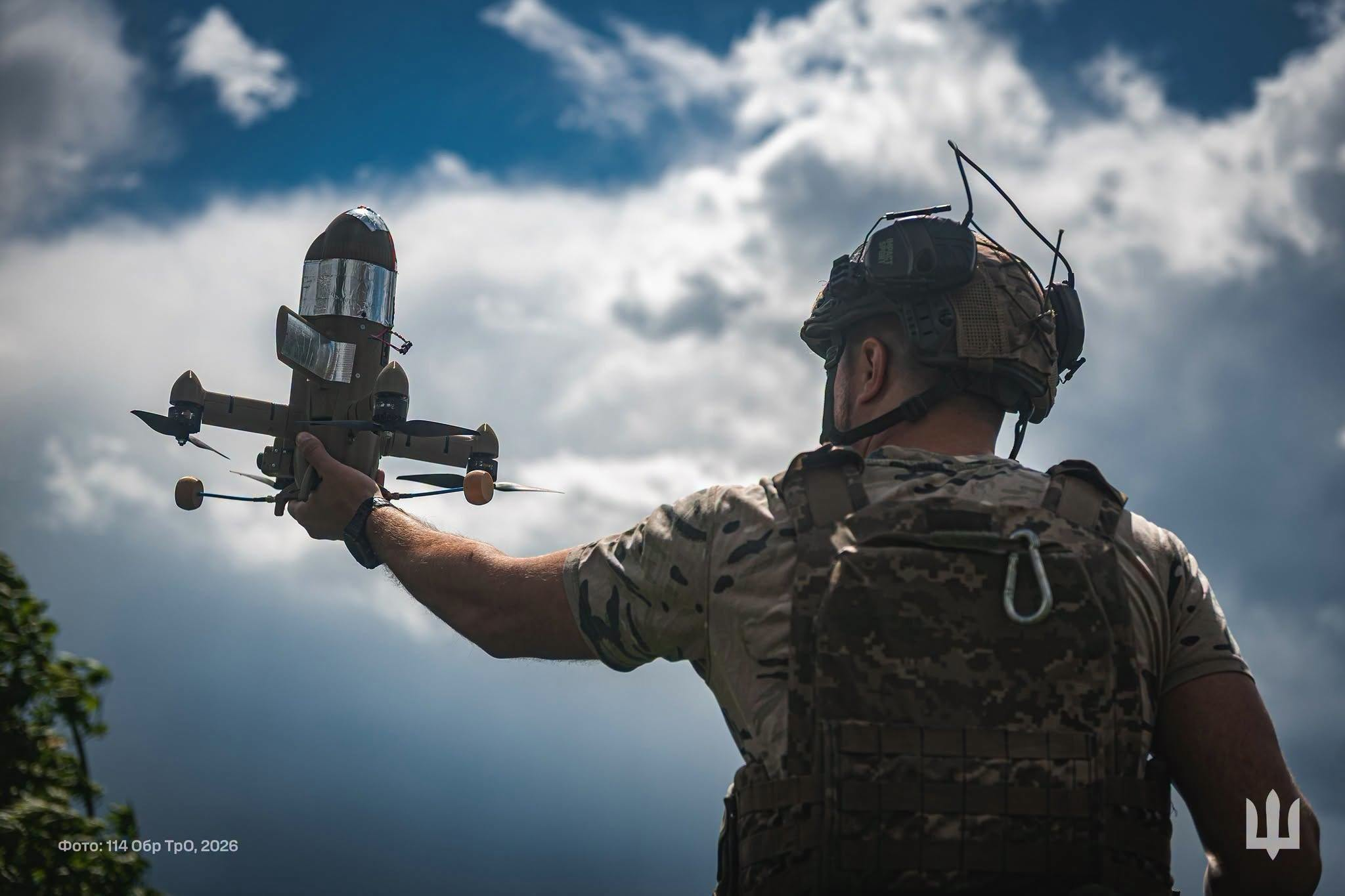
- Sting interceptor
- Type: Quadcopter; Loitering munition Interceptor drone
- Place of origin: Ukraine

Service history
- In service: 2024
- Wars: Russo-Ukrainian War

Production history
- Designer: Wild Hornets
- Manufacturer: Wild Hornets
- Unit cost: $2,100
- Produced: 2024
- No. built: 10,000 units per month

Specifications

The Sting (Ukrainian: Стінг) is a Ukrainian drone-intercepting loitering munition developed during the Russo-Ukrainian war.

== History ==
The Sting was developed by the Wild Hornets group for the purpose of intercepting the large number of Shahed drones that Russia use to attack Ukrainian cities and that can overwhelm other types of air defenses. The project was largely funded by volunteers and charitable donations, with key support from activist Serhii Sternenko.

After months of testing, modifications, and financial struggles (including a near-shutdown in early 2025), the Sting interceptor was born. Its first public success came in April 2025, when a video of a Sting downing a Shahed went viral, sparking widespread military interest and adoption.

== Design ==
Built with a 3D printed, aerodynamic, bullet-shaped frame and propelled by four rotors, the Sting can reach flight speeds of 213 mph (343 km/h) and cruise at an altitude of 10,000 ft (3,000 m). It uses Kurbas thermal imaging cameras from Odd Systems. Sting has an engagement range of up to 25 kilometers.Sting drones can be controlled from distances of up to 2,000 kilometers using the Hornet Vision Control system.

Cost estimates for a Sting is around $2,100; much cheaper than the estimated $35,000 cost of a Shahed drone.

== Operational history ==
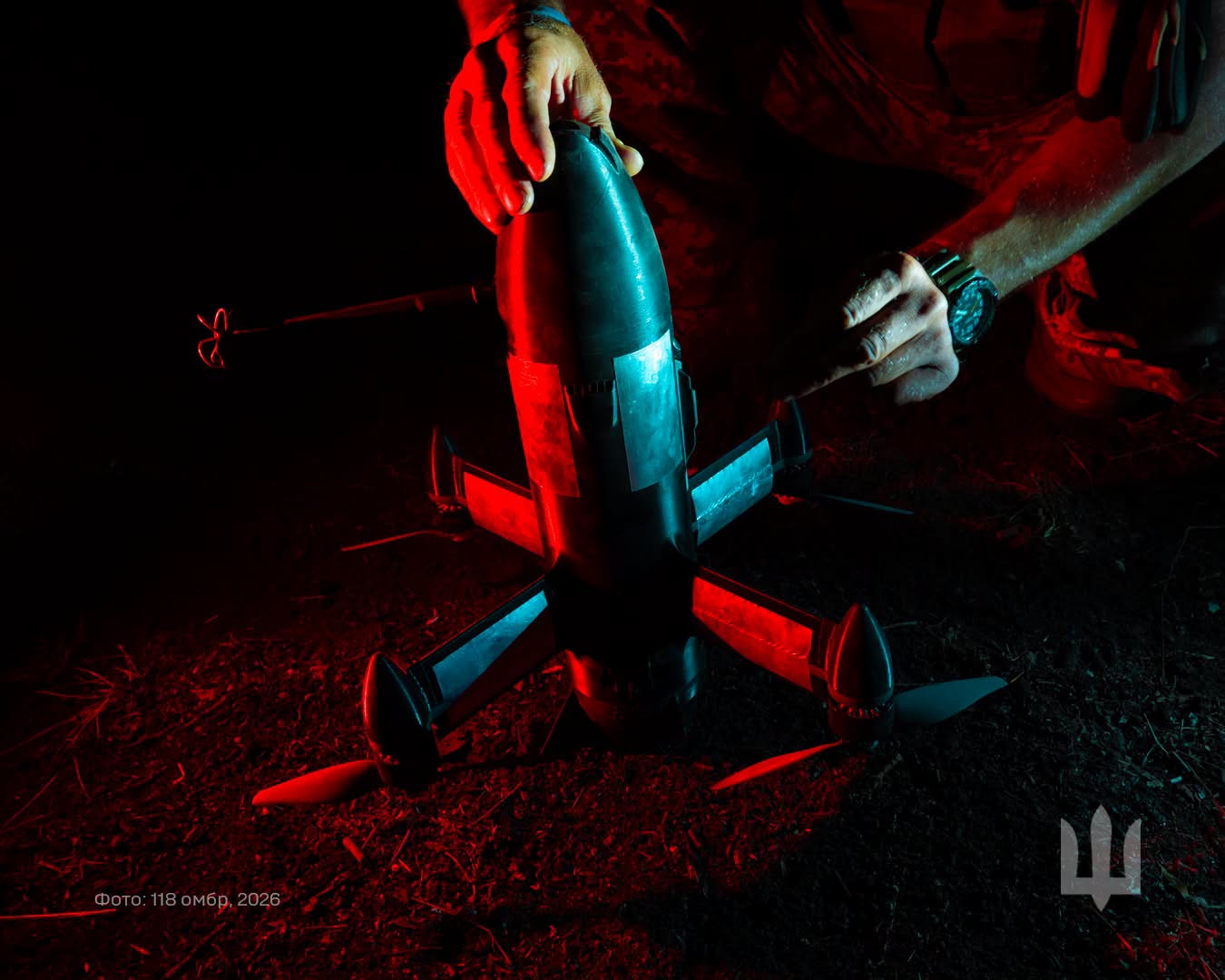
Sting with the 118th Brigade

Ukrainian MP Maryan Zablotskyy helped to secure a grant for the development of the Sting drone..

In May 2025, the Wild Hornets published thermal imaging footage from a Sting interceptor as it downed a Shahed drone, "marking a breakthrough in frontline drone defense".

On 1 August 2025 the supplier of the thermal cameras for the Sting claimed that it had intercepted "dozens of Iranian-Russian drones".

In October 2025 a Ukrainian military delegation visited Denmark and successfully demonstrated the Sting against a QinetiQ Banshee target drone.

Sting interceptor drones have destroyed over 1,000 enemy UAVs as of October 2025.

In December 2025, the Sting became the first interceptor to down the Russian Geran-3, a jet-powered variant of the Shahed drone. In April 2026, the Sting was responsible for 70% of the intercepted jet-powered Shaheds

Stings have destroyed over 3,900 Shahed/Geran drones as of February 2026.

The number of Shahed/Gerbera drones downed climbed to 7,000 in May 2026 and to 9,000 in June 2026.

The monthly production rate is over 10,000 units as of March 2026.

In April 2026, the Sting was Ukraine's top anti-Shahed interceptor drone per number of kills for 7 months in a row, as claimed by the manufacturer.

In April 2026, Ukraine's Unmanned Systems Forces have for the first time intercepted a Russian Shahed-type drone using a Sting interceptor launched from an unmanned surface vessel, a world premiere.

In April 2026, Ukrainian MP Maryan Zablotskyy conducted a historic experiment — he piloted an FPV interceptor drone first from his office, then in front of the state border, and then another 2,000 km away from the drone itself — from abroad.

In August 2026, a Sting interceptor set the world record for drone-on-drone interception at 6,858 meters of altitude, destroying a Russian reconnaissance drone. This record was beaten again in August 2026 with an interception at 7,472 meters of altitude.

It was revealed in late August 2026 that STING interceptors can be launched from the sea, using the unmanned surface vehicles (USV) Magura and transforming it into a floating counter-drone battery equipped with 18 Sting interceptors.

The 20th of September 2026, the STING S version destroyed a high-speed Geran-5 small cruise missile.

In October 2026 alone, the STING interceptors downed 1,600 russian drones.

From October 2025 to September 2026, STINGs downed more than 15,500 russian drones, including more than 10,000 from the Shahed/Geran types, making STING the most efficient means of intercepting russian drones for 12 months in a row.

== Variants ==
- Sting S: Upgraded version designed specifically to counter jet-powered drones such as Geran-4 and Geran-5. The exact specifications have not been released.

== See also ==
- List of Russo-Ukrainian War military equipment
- UJ-25 Skyline – Ukrainian unmanned aerial vehicle
- UJ-26 Bober (drone) – Ukrainian long-range UAV
- Terminal Autonomy AQ-400 Scythe
- Shahed 238 – Iranian unmanned aerial combat vehicles
