= Terminal Autonomy AQ-400 Scythe =

AQ-400 Scythe
- Type: One-way attack drone
- Place of origin: Ukraine

Service history
- In service: 2023–present
- Used by: Ukraine
- Wars: Russian invasion of Ukraine

Production history
- Designed: 2022-2023
- Manufacturer: Terminal Autonomy
- Unit cost: USD$30,000
- Produced: 2023-present

Specifications
- Mass: 100 kg (220 lb)
- Wingspan: 2.3 m (7.5 ft)
- Warhead: 43 kg (95 lb)
- Blast yield: 32 kg (71 lb)
- Operational range: 750 km (470 mi)
- Flight altitude: 30–3,000 m (98–9,843 ft)
- Maximum speed: 200 km/h (120 mph)

The AQ-400 Scythe is a one-way attack drone designed and built by the Ukrainian company Terminal Autonomy during the Russian invasion of Ukraine.

== History ==
Terminal Autonomy, previously named One Way Aerospace, was founded in mid-2022 by two veterans of the British and Australian militaries and a Ukrainian engineer to develop various low-cost, domestically produced kamikaze drones. One product was the AQ-400, which was first demonstrated in spring 2023. The Armed Forces of Ukraine received the first batch in December 2023. Initial plans are to produce 100 units per month, and then scale up to 500 per month in Q2 2024, with a goal of producing 1,000 units monthly. In July 2026, a factory that produced AQ-400 and AQ-100 Bayonet drones in Kyiv was destroyed by a Russian ballistic missile.

== Design ==
The AQ-400 is characterized by swift assembly, mass production capabilities, and cost-effectiveness. The fuselage is made from milled sheets of plywood from civilian furniture factories, which is a more scalable alternative than 3-D printing or other materials such as fiberglass. Technical training is not required, allowing them to be manufactured at scale without skilled labor. Although some components are sourced from abroad, the focus is on maximizing production within Ukraine's borders. It has two sets of wings, one forward and one rear, with a wingspan of 2.3 m; 30 fully-assembled Scythes can be stacked in one shipping container for transport. Take off is achieved from short airstrips using its own tricycle landing gear or from a catapult using rocket boosters. Overall weight is 100 kg with a 43 kg payload, of which 32 kg is the warhead which can be thermobaric or hold two 122 mm artillery shells. Using the standard gas engine and pusher propeller, the AQ-400 has a cruise speed of 144 km/h (89 mph), a top speed of 200 km/h, endurance of 6.5 hours, and a strike range of 750 km; depending on the engine option, range could be increased as far as 900 km (560 mi), or payload increased to 70 kg (150 lb) at a reduced range.

Guidance at low altitude uses a laser altimeter to approach at 30 m to minimize the effects of electronic warfare to jam GPS navigation until very close to the target. At high altitudes of 3,000 m, it navigates with a visual positioning system using roads and other visible landmarks. A video link option is available so an operator can manually guide the drone to hit moving targets, but this adds costs and only works at shorter ranges. The basic Scythe airframe costs USD$15,000, which increases to USD$30,000 with a guidance system and other features; this compares to around USD$20,000 for a Shahed-136 one-way attack munition used by Russia. Swarms can use a leader-follower method, where one lead drone carrying a navigation system is followed by nine basic drones, which help saturate the target area and draw off enemy defenses from the lethal version. The use of such drones is intended to overwhelm air defenses as well as make them expend expensive interceptors against cheaper targets, exhausting their supplies over time.

== Operators ==
- Ukraine

== See also ==
- Shahed-136
- Liutyi
- Trembita (cruise missile)
- UJ-25 Skyline
