= Leon Mishnaevsky Jr. =

Materials scientist and professor

Leon Mishnaevsky Jr. is a materials scientist and professor of computational micromechanics of materials at the Technical University of Denmark (DTU). His research focuses on computational modelling and optimization of materials used in the wind energy industry.

== Career ==
Mishnaevsky received a diploma in electro-mechanical engineering and a doctorate in Ukraine, and completed his habilitation in mechanics at the Technical University of Darmstadt in 2005. In 2003, he was awarded a Heisenberg Fellowship by the German Research Foundation (DFG). In 2026, DTU appointed him professor of computational micromechanics of materials for wind energy applications.

== Research ==
Mishnaevsky's research has focused on the mechanics and materials of renewable energy applications. Mishnaevsky has also studied erosion and microplastic emission from operating wind turbine blades.

His books include Computational Mesomechanics of Composites (Wiley, 2007) and, with Siegfried Schmauder, Micromechanics and Nanosimulation of Metals and Composites (Springer, 2009).
