= TRML =

Air defense radar system

Hensoldt TRML-3D/4D
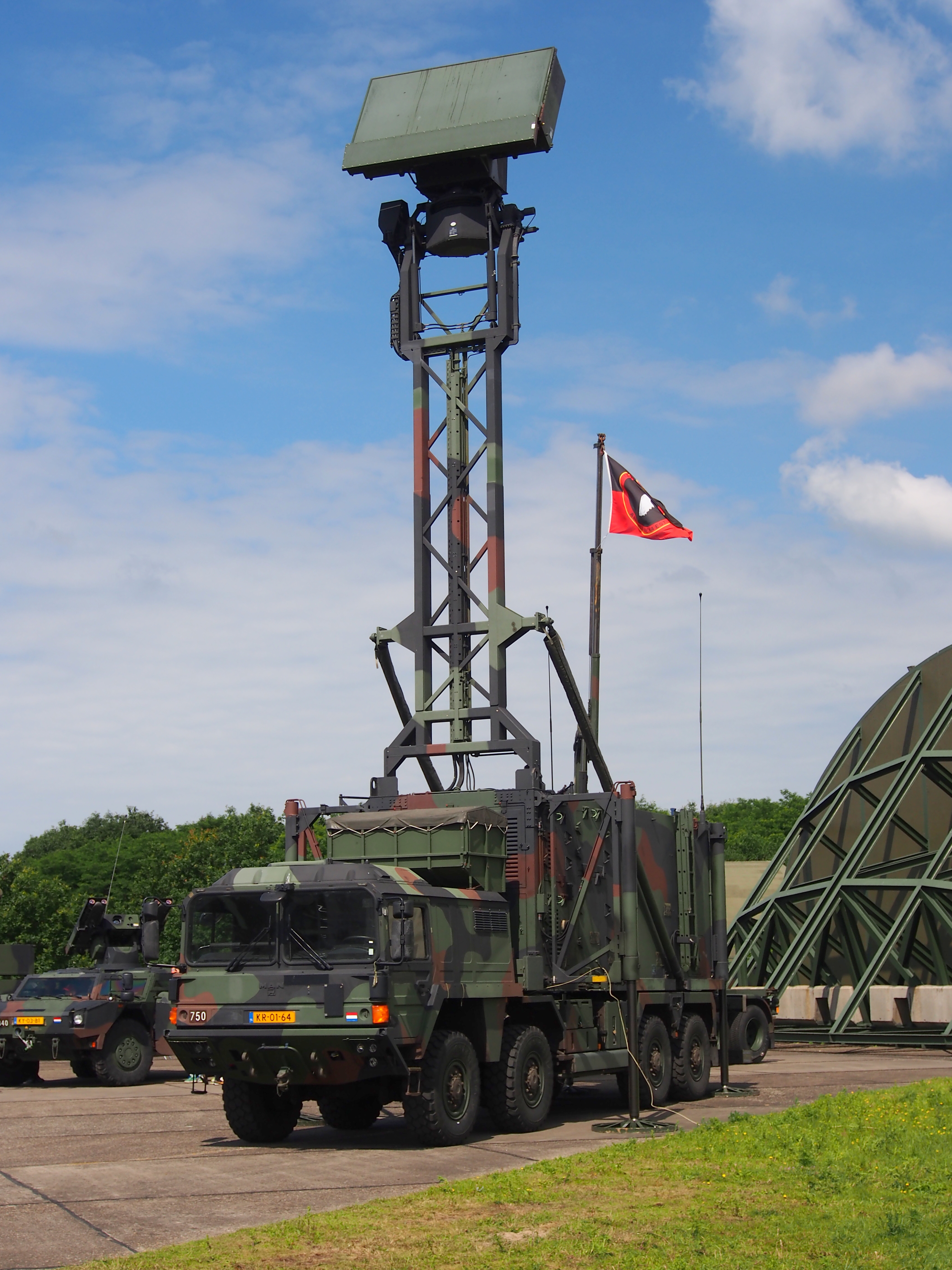
- Telefunken Radar Mobil Luftraumüberwachung
- Country of origin: Germany
- Type: Early warning radar
- Frequency: C band
- Range: Between 40 and 250 kilometres (25 and 155 mi), depending on variant
- Altitude: Between 0 and 40,000 metres (0 and 131,234 ft), depending on variant

The TRML (German: Telefunken Radar Mobil Luftraumüberwachung or "Telefunken mobile airspace surveillance radar") is a family of air defense radars first developed by Telefunken and currently produced by Hensoldt. It is a development of the earlier TRMS (German: Telefunken Radar Mobil Such or "Telefunken mobile search radar").

Retractable mast versions are TRML-2D with a rotating parabolic antenna and TRML-3D with a rotating phased array antenna, designated as Nahbereichsradar (NBR) or "short range radar" by the Bundeswehr. The latest TRML-4D comes with non-retractable, rotating base active electronically scanned array (AESA) solid-state antenna.

== System description ==
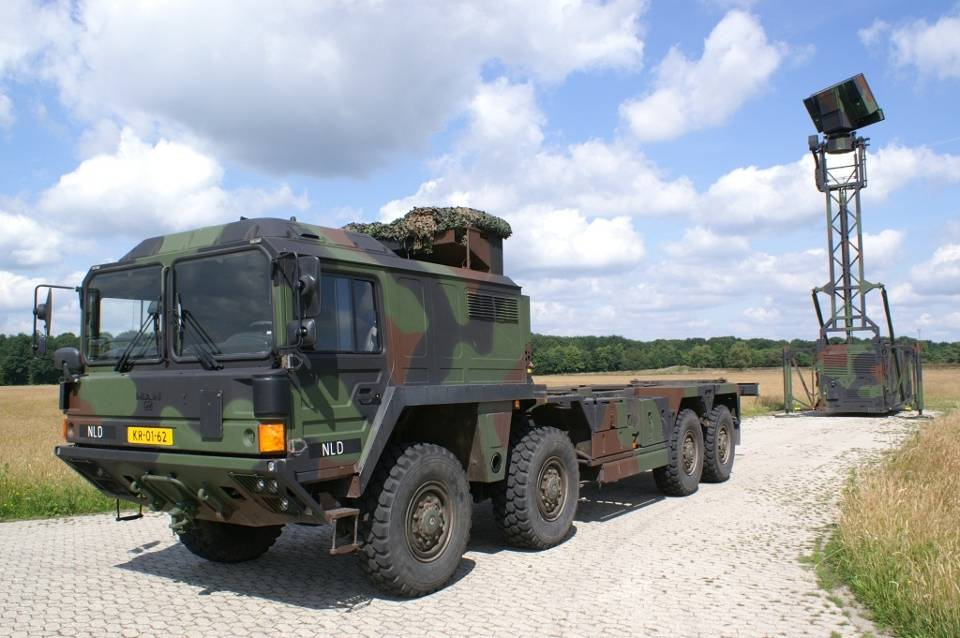
TRML-3D module removed from the base vehicle (MAN 10 ton)

TRML-2D was designed as an autonomous mobile command system for air defense with an integrated search radar. It can detect, identify and track aircraft at low and medium altitude, designate targets for the connected launchers and send commands to the battle management network. The range of the radar is 60 km for TRML-2D, 200 km for the TRML-3D/32, and 250 km for TRML-4D.

The crew shelter with integrated retractable mast is loaded onto a truck (Bundeswehr designation "Lkw 15 t mil gl BR"), but can also be dismantled to operate as a standalone trailer. A power generator is integrated on the unit. The crew consists of two or three surveillance radar operators.

The radar includes a sideband channel for detecting helicopters. This enables simultaneous action against fast, low-flying aircraft and anti-aircraft missiles as well as against extremely slow-flying targets such as hovering helicopters. The EPM (Electronic Protective Measures) equipment to protect against ECM in the Electronic Warfare and high-resolution clutter suppression permit the detection and monitoring of even very small targets in difficult environmental conditions. TRML can feed the detected tracks into air defense combat management systems (HFLaAFüSyS 9, HEROS 2) to create more detailed picture of the airspace.

The manufacturer is the company DASA, which has been merged into EADS and has been trading under the name Airbus Defense and Space since January 2014. With the spin-off of the electronics division of Airbus Defense and Space at the end of February 2017, the company became Hensoldt.

=== TRML 2D ===
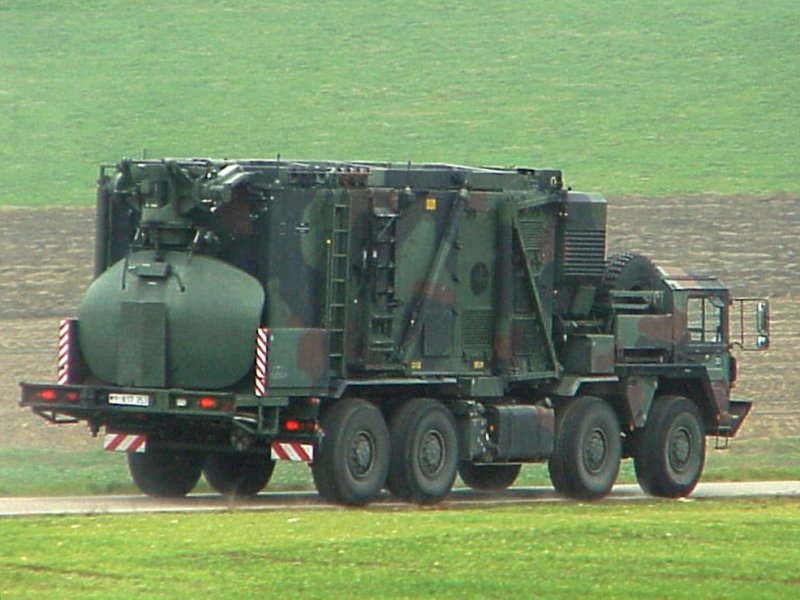
TRML-2D on the move

TRML-2D uses rotating parabolic antenna with a cosecant-square pattern, where the lower edge slightly deviating from the parabolic shape (a so-called "lower lip"). The antenna can transmit and receive linearly and circularly polarized signals. The maximum antenna height is 12 m (top edge); the antenna can also operate on the roof of the shelter. Rotation rate is 14 to 27 RPM (2.25 to 4.44 s). The IFF antenna is integrated into the primary antenna. An omnidirectional antenna element for sidelobe suppression is located above the parabolic reflector.

The range is specified by the manufacturer as 46 km for targets with a radar cross-section of 1 m^{2} and a probability of detection of 80% up to an altitude of 6000 m. For targets with a radar cross section of 3 m^{2}, the range is 60 km.

=== TRML 3D ===
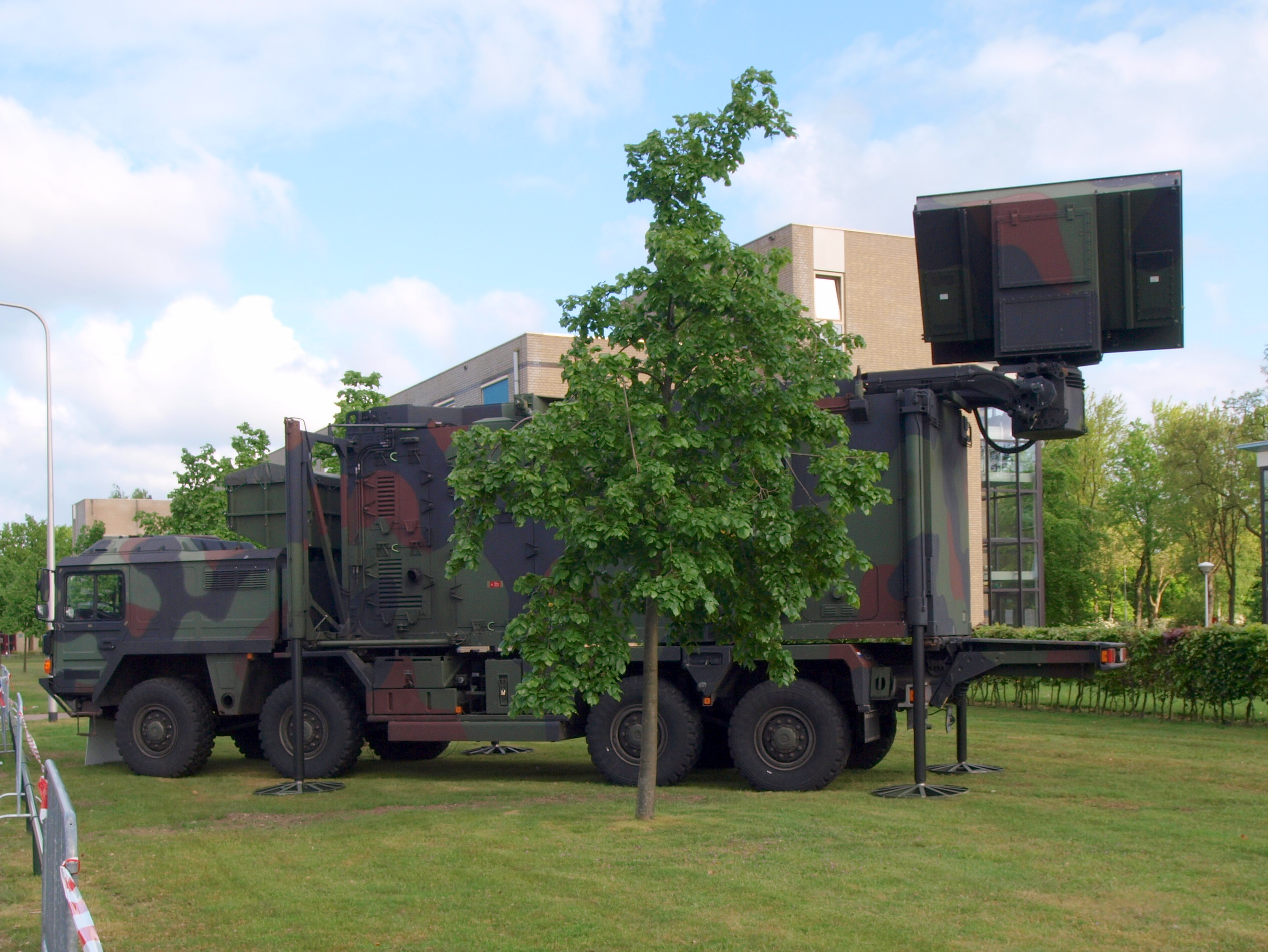
TRML-3D with antenna at the roof level

TRML-3D version is fitted with a 16 or 32-element passive electronically scanned array. In the standard version, the antenna has linear horizontal polarization; vertical polarization is available as an option. It is mounted on a truck MAN SX45. This radar entered service in 2004.

=== TRS-3D ===
The marine search radar TRS-3D was created from blocks used by the TRML-3D, the first generation of this radar is uses PESA modules.

A new variant, the TRS-3D Baseline D is being used by the US Coast Guard, known locally as the AN/SPS-75 radar. It uses solid-state GaN emitters.

As of 2023, more than 50 of this variant are operational.

=== TRML-4D ===
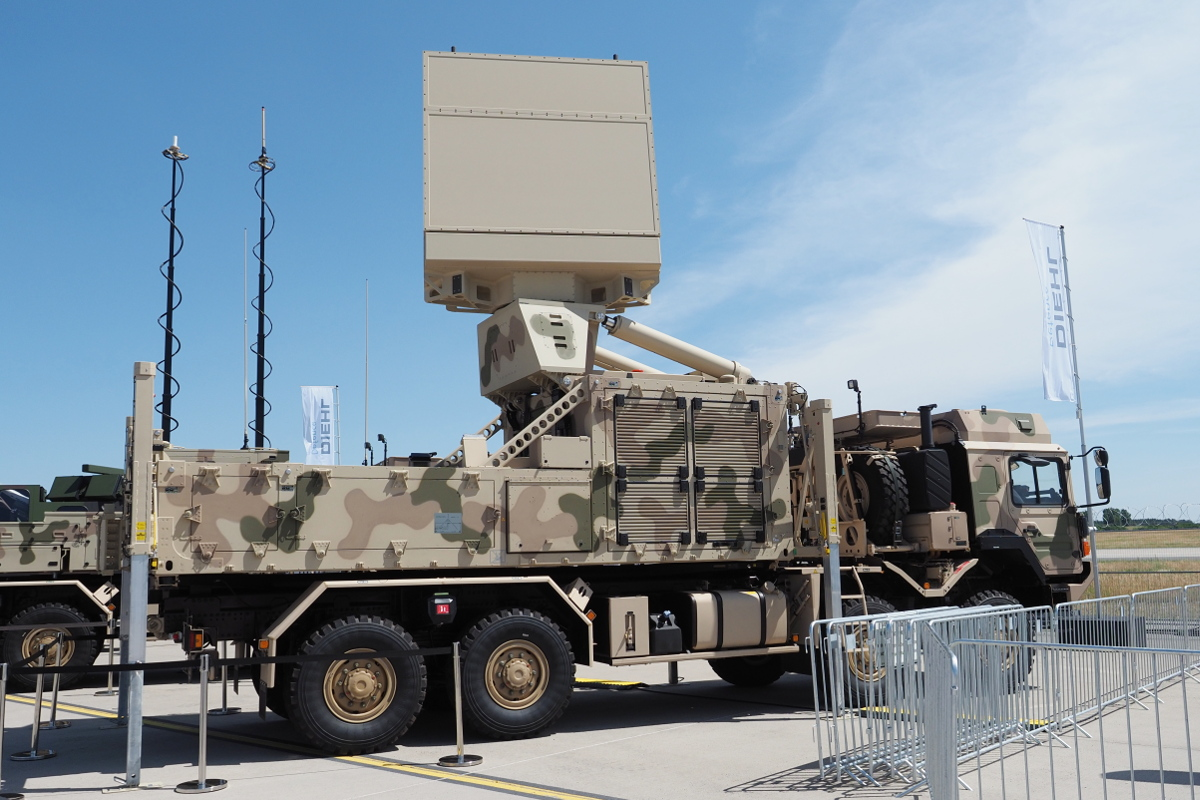
TRML-4D for IRIS-T SLM

A new version of the radar was presented by Hensoldt at the Eurosatory in 2018. It was to be delivered to customers in 2020.

The radar unit includes a completely redesigned AESA antenna with solid-state GaN elements, mounted on a non-retractable continuously rotating base. The system does not include an integrated operator shelter anymore, so a separate module is needed. TRML-4D combines digital beamforming with pulse-Doppler radar to detect difficult-to-locate airborne targets such as hovering helicopters or low-flying cruise missiles. The system has increased performance compared to its predecessors and is able to track 1500 targets at a range of up to 250 km. It supports Mode 5 and Mode S identification. The radar unit includes an onboard power generator and can be carried by any truck that has standard 20 ft (6.1 m) ISO container fittings. Instrumented range specified as 250 km in 2018, expected to track fighter-type targets more than 120 km away.

The IRIS-T SLS, SLM and SLX use primarily the TRML-4D as fire control radar. The TRML-4D radar is slated to be used in the pan-European Freyja anti-ballistic missile system after 2027.

=== TRS-4D ===
The marine version of the TRML-4D family is called TRS-4D. Two variants of this radar exist, one in fixed panel arrays, and the other as a rotating radar.

The American variant of the TRS-4D is designated as the AN/SPS-80 and is the rotating variant.

=== Specifications ===
Parameters	TRML-3D/32	TRML-4D	TRS-3D/32	TRS-4D rotating	TRS-4D non-rotating
	Capabilities				
Radar type	Pulse doppler, PESA	Pulse doppler, AESA	Pulse doppler, PESA	Pulse doppler, AESA	Pulse doppler, AESA
Transceiver module types	GaN solide-state	GaN solide-state	GaN solide-state	GaN solide-state	GaN solide-state
Frequency band	C-band (IEEE); G--band (NATO)				
Roles	Air surveillance / target acquisition (short-medium range air defence systems)	Air surveillance / target acquisition (short-medium range air defence systems)	Medium-range air and surface surveillance system / target acquisition (short-medium range air defence systems)	Medium-range air and surface surveillance system / target acquisition (short-medium range air defence systems)	Medium-range air and surface surveillance system / target acquisition (short-medium range air defence systems)
Installation	Custom installation on a 8×8 MAN SX45 truck	20-foot ISO container	–	–	–
Set up time	Deployment and tear-down < 10 minutes	Deployment and tear-down < 10 minutes	–	–	–
Operation	Remote operation possible	Remote operation possible	Detection automatic	Detection automatic	Detection automatic
Mass	10 t (22,000 lb)	–	575 kg (1,268 lb)	–	–
	Specifications				
Number targets	> 400	1,500	> 750	> 1,000	> 1,500
IFF	SSR MSSR2000I MK XA, Mk XII and Mode S	MkXII-A/S capability (incl. Mode 5 and Mode S)	Mode 5 and Mode S	Mode 5	not specified
Elevation	–	-2° to +70° (up to -10° with electronic tilt down)	55° coverage	-2° to +70° (search) -2° to +90° (tracking)	-2° to +70° (search) -2° to +90° (tracking)
Tracking azimuth (of the antenna itself)	–	-45° to +45°	–	–	-50° to + 50°
Azimuth scan	–	360°	360°	360°	–
Instrumented range	200 km (120 mi)	250 km (160 mi)	108 nmi (200 km)	250 km (130 nmi)	250 km (130 nmi)
Missile track range	–	60 km (37 mi)	10 nmi (19 km) (low altitude)	> 14 km (8.7 mi) (small surface target) radar horizon (sea skimmer)	> 14 km (8.7 mi) (small surface target) radar horizon (sea skimmer)
Jet fighter track range	–	120 km (75 mi)	–	< 100 km (62 mi)	< 110 km (68 mi)
Altitude	23,000 m (75,000 ft)	30,000 m (98,000 ft)	–	–	–
Minimum range	–	< 120 m (130 yd)	0.1 nmi (0.19 km)	< 200 m (220 yd)	< 200 m (220 yd)
RCS capability	–	0.01 m^{2} (0.11 ft^{2})	–	< 0.01 m^{2} (0.11 ft^{2})	< 0.01 m^{2} (0.11 ft^{2})
Air target tracking accuracy (track-while scan mode)	–	Azimuth: < 0.2° Elevation: < 0.3° Range: < 15 m (16 yd)	Azimuth: < 0.24° Elevation: < 1.3° Range: < 25 m (27 yd)	Azimuth: < 0.4° Elevation: < 0.2° Range: < 15 m (16 yd)	Azimuth: < 0.4° Elevation: < 0.2° Range: < 15 m (16 yd)
	Power supply				
Voltage	240/400 V, 50 Hz	–	–	–	–
Power generator	42 kVA	–	–	–	–
Power consumpion	33 kVA	–	–	–	–

== Operators of land radars ==
=== TRML-2D ===
Germany (–)
Formerly used with a C2 center (command and control)center for the fire control of the ROLAND.

=== TRML-3D ===
==== Current operators ====
Lithuania (3)
3 in service with the Lithuanian Air Force, contract signed in 2001, all delivered by August 2004.
Malaysia (2)
2 radars ordered in December 2005, and delivered by 2008. The contract included an option for 8 additional radars to be ordered in 2006, but it was not exercised.
Netherlands (5)
The Royal Netherlands Army operates 5 TRML-3D/32 with the NASAMS 2 air defence system as part of the AGBADS (Army Ground-based Air Defence System), those are used as air-surveillance radars.
Oman (1)
Radar operated by the Royal Guard of Oman. It is used as a fire control radar for the MICA VL air defence system, tested in 2012.
Thailand (3)
The radar is being operated by the Royal Thai Army with its MICA VL air defence system. The first 2 radars were ordered in 2014. The third radar was ordered in 2020, for a delivery by 2022. The variant used is the TRML-3D/32-6.

=== TRML-4D ===
Egypt (23)
Orders:
- 7 ordered with IRIS-T SLM ground-based air defense systems in 2018
- 10 ordered with IRIS-T SLX approved in December 2021
- 6 ordered with IRIS-T SLS
Estonia
Order
- Unknown number ordered with IRIS-T SLM in 2023
Germany (1 delivered, 5 more on order, 2 in option)
Order (6)
- 6 ordered with IRIS-T SLM in July 2023
Options (2)
- 2 additional to be ordered with the additional IRIS-T SLM planned
As of August 2024, one battery has been delivered with its radar
Latvia
Order
- Unknown number ordered with IRIS-T SLM in 2023
Slovenia
Order (2)
- 2 ordered with IRIS-T SLM in July 2023
Sweden
Order (2)
- 2 ordered with IRIS-T SLM in June 2025
Ukraine (16 in service, 6 more on order)
Orders (22)
- 4 ordered in October 2022
- 2 ordered in January 2023
- 6 ordered in May 2023 (€100 million)
- 4 ordered in June 2023
- 6 ordered in May 2024
- unknown quantity ordered in July 2025
Deliveries (16)
- 16 TRML-4D delivered as of April 2025
- On 18 November 2026, Germany announced it would provide TRML-4D radars for use with the Freyja (missile system).

=== Potential sales TRML-4D ===
Austria (8)
8 IRIS-T fire units with 3 launchers each are to be purchased by Austria. It will include IRIS-T SLM and SLS batteries. The decision for this system was announced in September 2023.
Bulgaria (1 + 6)
The Bulgarian parliament approved the purchase of 1 fire unit of the IRIS-T SLM for the Bulgarian Air Force in August 2024. The TRML-4D is the likely radar, but not confirmed yet.
An option for up to 5 IRIS-T SLM and 1 IRIS-T SLX fire units is available until 2032.
Romania (up to 41)
The Romanian armed forces are looking for up to 41 short-range air-defence systems, among the competitors are the IRIS-T SLS and IRIS-T SLM, but also the VL MICA, all of which could be using the TRML-4D.
Lithuania
On 21 May 2024, in the meeting with Germany Federal Ministry of Defence Boris Pistorius, the Ministry of National Defence Laurynas Kasčiūnas said that Lithuania was considering purchasing IRIS-T medium-range air defense system.
Switzerland
Pre-selected
- As part of the programme BODLUV-MR, Diehl was the only company offering a short-range air defence system with the IRIS-T SLM. Armasuisse will now initiate the negotiations with Diehl for the purchase of an unknown number of systems which are to be financed with the 2025 Armament Programme.

== Operators of naval radars ==
=== TRS-3D ===
==== Current operators ====
Denmark (1 operational, 3 retired)
- 1 TRS-3D/16 used with the Søløven (Y311) diving support vessel (Flyvefisken class, SF300 – Serie 3) of the Danish Navy.
- 3 TRS-3D operated on Niels Juel class corvettes when modernised, and these ships were decommissioned in 2009.
Finland (7 operational)
Finnish Navy:
- 4 TRS-3D/16ES with the Hamina class corvettes.
- 2 TRS-3D/16ES with the Hämeenmaa class minelayer after a modernisation in 2007.
Finnish Coast Guard:
- 1 TRS-3D with the Turva OPV.
Germany (5 operational, 8 retired)
- 8 TRS-3D/32 that were installed on the Bremen class frigates (F122).
- 5 TRS-3D/16 which equip the Braunschweig class corvettes (K130 - Batch 1).
Malaysia (6 operational)
6 TRS-3D/16 ES operated on the Kedah class OPV (a MEKO 100 RMN).
Norway (5 operational, 2 retired)
Radar used on two ships of the Norwegian Naval Forces:
Royal Norwegian Navy:
- 1 TRS-3D/16 ES used with the HNoMS Nordkapp (a mine countermeasure command vessel).
Norwegian Coast Guard:
- 2 TRS-3D/16 ES that were used on 2 Nordkapp class OPV of the Norwegian Coast Guard that were retired.
- 1 TRS-3D/16 new generation ordered in 2019 for the Norwegian Coast Guard vessel KV Svalbard (AESA solid state with GaN TRM).
- 3 TRS-3D/16 new generation used with the Jan Mayen class Offshore patrol vessel (AESA solid state with GaN TRM).
Philippines (2 operational)
2 TRS-3D Baseline D that equip the 2 ships of the Jose Rizal class.
Portugal (4 operational, 2 spare)
6 TRS-3D/16 that equip the 6 ships of the Flyvefisken class (SF300 – Serie 2) sold by the Danish Navy to the Portuguese Navy.The Portuguese uses four ships as patrol ships, they class was renamed Tejo class, and 2 were retired for spare parts.
Spain (2)
2 TRS-3D/16 installed on the Galicia class amphibious transport dock of the Spanish Navy.
United States (13)
Used on several ships of the US Armed Forces:
- US Navy
  - 8 TRS-3D/16 ES (AN/SPS-75) Freedom-class LCS.
- US Coast Guard
  - 12 TRS-3D Baseline D (AN/SPS-75) for the Legend-class National Security Cutter (NSC).
  - 1 TRS-3D Baseline D (AN/SPS-75) ordered in 2023 for the Coast Guard training center (TRACEN) located in Petaluma, California.

=== TRS-4D ===
==== Current operators ====
Germany (7 rotating + 41 fixed planar arrays radars)
Ordered and in service with the German Navy:
- 5 rotating TRS-4D ordered in February 2019 to equip the Braunschweig class corvettes (K130 - Batch 2).
- 2 rotating TRS-4D ordered in February 2019 for land based systems (training).
- 16 fixed planar arrays TRS-4D used on the 4 Baden-Württemberg class (F125).
- 16 fixed planar arrays TRS-4D to equip the Niedersachsen class frigates (F126) ordered in 2022.
- 1 fixed planar arrays TRS-4D to equip the test center ordered in 2022.
- 8 fixed planar arrays TRS-4D to equip the two additional Niedersachsen class frigates (F126) ordered in August 2024.
United States (8 rotating radars)
8 rotating TRS-4D (AN/SPS-80) ordered for the Freedom-class LCS (Littoral combat ship) and the first were installed in 2019.
Chile (3 rotating radars)
3 rotating TRS-4D installed on the modernised Duke class frigates (Type 23).
Brazil (4 rotating radars ordered + 5 planned)
4 rotating TRS-4D ordered for the Brazilian Navy Tamandaré class based on the MEKO A-100 family of warships. 5 additional ships of this class are planned in the future. The first ship entered in service in April 2026.

==== Future operators ====
Saudi Arabia (12 rotating radars)
The TRS 4D is used on several ships:
- 4 rotating TRS-4D (AN/SPS-80) ordered for the 4 Freedom-class LCS (Littoral combat ship) ordered by the Royal Saudi Navy.
- 8 rotating TRS-4D ordered for 3 Avante 2200 corvettes (Al Jubail class).
