= Peklo =

Ukrainian loitering munition

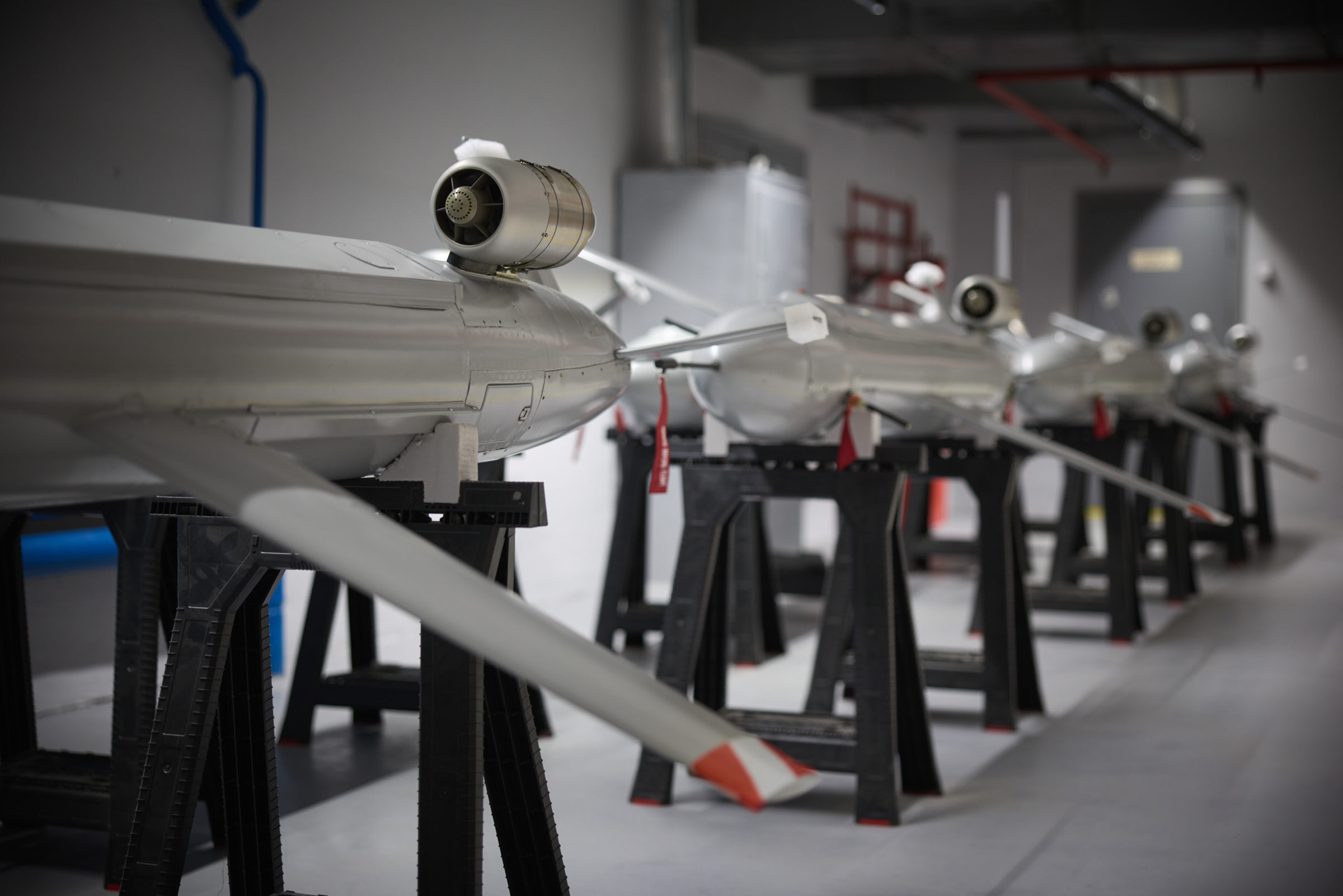
- Type: Turbojet drone
- Place of origin: Ukraine

Service history
- In service: 2024
- Used by: Ukraine
- Wars: Russo-Ukrainian War

Production history
- Produced: 2024

Specifications
- Engine: turbojet

Peklo (Ukrainian: Пекло, lit. 'Hell') is a Ukrainian long-range loitering munition or missile-drone developed during the Russian invasion of Ukraine.

This loitering munition is equipped with a jet engine and combines the characteristics of a kamikaze drone and cruise missile.

== Description ==
Peklo was developed by the Ukrainian Defense Industry and is presumably based on the Palianytsia missile-drone, which was also developed during the Russian invasion of Ukraine. Through the remote-controlled turbojet engine, the drone is capable of reaching subsonic speeds of up to 700 km/h (Mach 0.57), and has a maximum range of 700 km. It was reported that the weapon is composed of up to 70% domestically produced components, however it may still face supply chain issues.

As details of missile are sparse due to a general reluctance to reveal too much information to its adversary in the war, photo image analysis by the media indicates that the weight of the warhead may not be more than 50 kg due to the fuselage. However the media arrived at different conclusions on the launching mechanism, with Ukrainian media Defence Express concluding that it is likely a land-based system, while BBC determined that it can be launched from aircraft.

== Operational history ==
The development of the missile took less than a year and it had five successful deployments prior to the delivery of the first batch.

On 6 December 2024, the Ukrainian Armed Forces Day, the drone was unveiled by President Volodymyr Zelenskyy in a ceremony, and 100 units had been manufactured in the three months prior to the first batch of the weapon being delivered to Ukrainian forces.

== See also ==
- List of Russo-Ukrainian War military equipment
- UJ-25 Skyline – Ukrainian unmanned aerial vehicle
- UJ-26 Bober (drone) – Ukrainian long-range UAV
- Palianytsia (missile) – Ukrainian cruise missile
- Quds cruise missile – Cruise missile
- Shahed 238 – Iranian unmanned aerial combat vehicles
- Flamingo (missile) – Ukrainian cruise missile
- Sting (drone) – Ukrainian anti-drone loitering munition
