= 1st Center of the Unmanned Systems Forces =

1st Center of the Unmanned Systems Forces (2025) 14th Separate Unmanned Aerial Systems Regiment (2023–2025)
- 1-й окремий Центр безпілотних авіаційних комплексів
- Active: 2023–present
- Country: Ukraine
- Branch: Unmanned Systems Forces
- Type: Brigade
- Role: UAV deep-strike operations
- Part of: Armed Forces of Ukraine
- Engagements: Russo-Ukrainian War: Russian invasion of Ukraine; 2024 Kursk offensive
- Website: https://14reg.army/en/#mainscreen

Commanders
- Current commander: Callsign "Charlie" (2023-)

Insignia
- original insignia

The 1st Center of Unmanned Systems Forces is a major unit of the Unmanned Systems Forces in Ukraine.

It was originally established in 2022 as the 14th (Separate) Regiment of the Ukrainian Ground Forces. It saw combat following the Russian invasion of Ukraine, including combat operations on Russian territory.

Around March 2025, the 14th Regiment was accounting for an estimated 30-40% of deep strikes conducted by the Armed Forces of Ukraine.

== History ==
=== 2022 ===
The origins of the 14th Regiment lie in August 2022, when commander “Fidel” proposed to Valerii Zaluzhnyi (Commander-in-Chief of the Armed Forces of Ukraine) a plan to create a deep-strike battalion. By September, the 14th Regiment had been formed, with “Fidel” in charge. The unit became operational in October 2022, at first as a combat unit of the 190th Training Center.

=== 2023 ===
On 22 August 2023, the unit was officially recognized as a separate regiment specialized in Unmanned Aerial Vehicles in the Armed Forces of Ukraine. The individual units of the 14th Regiment then carried out reconnaissance and strike operations in numerous sectors, along the entire front line.

In November 2023, the regiment fought in the Zaporizhia Oblast as part of the 2023 Ukrainian counteroffensive, and struck multiple Russian positions in Oleshky.

The regiment supported combat operations in Robotyne and on November 3, 2023, a soldier of the regiment (Taras Dmytrovych Davidyuk) was killed near Robotyne. Then it was involved in the battle of Avdiivka with a soldier (Mykhailo Ughryniuk Mytnyk) being killed on 23 November 2023.

=== 2024 ===
In February 2024, the regiment engaged in combat operations alongside the 46th Aeromobile Brigade of the Ukrainian Air Assault Forces.

In June 2024, aerial reconnaissance of the 14th Regiment, in coordination with M142 HIMARS artillery, destroyed the Russian high-value Buk missile system in the Donetsk sector

On July 22, 2024, soon after the establishment of Unmanned Systems Forces, the regiment was transferred to the new command.

Units of the 14th Regiment provided combat support for various units of the Armed Forces of Ukraine involved in the August 2024 Kursk Oblast incursion.

In December 2024, the regiment - in coordination with 412th UAV regiment - destroyed a 9A331M2 Russian Tor-M2 air defense system worth $27 million in Zaporizhia Oblast.

=== 2025 ===
During the night of 28/29 January 2025, the 14th Regiment launched a strike on a pumping station on the Druzhba pipeline along the Russian-Belarusian border in Bryansk Oblast. The unit was reportedly using drones which could drop bombs on the targets: according to Defense Express, these drones carry a FAB-250 M-54 high-explosive bomb attached to their underbellies and feature an optical sighting system for precision strikes. On 31 January 2025, the Unmanned System Forces confirmed the use of drones carrying 250 kg (550 lb) aerial bombs. According to the USF Command, these drones are capable of "reaching up to 2,000 kilometres (1,200 mi) with the possibility of return. This is a unique development that changes the rules of the game on the battlefield."

In March 2025 the 14th UAS Regiment launched salvos of the Ukrainian-made Liutyi (Fierce) strike drone against Russian oil refineries, fuel depots, airfields and ammunition warehouses.

On 25 September 2025, the unit struck three gas distribution stations in: Shchastia, Severodonetsk and Novopskov (all located in Luhansk Oblast).

In October 2025, the 14th Regiment was renamed: the 1st Center of the Unmanned Systems Forces.

On 13 October 2025, The New York Times reported another Liutyi strike against the Saratov refinery, including the fact that the strike commander's call sign was “Casper”. Call sign “Casper” is used by the Commander of the 1st Battalion.

On 31 October 2025, the Associated Press reported another Liutyi strike against Russian targets, including the fact that the strike commander's call sign was “Fidel”. Call sign “Fidel” is used by the Co-Founder of the 1st Center.

=== 2026 ===
On May 7th ruck the Center hit two Russian Buk-M3 surface-to-air missile systems in Donetsk region. The Buk-M3 a modern medium-range air defense system is meant to target drones, missiles, and small aircraft. The Unit also hit railway fuel tankers and a fuel storage facility in Luhansk region during the same attack.

In May of 2026 operators of the 1st Separate Center of the Unmanned Systems Forces struck a Russian UAV training center in the occupied city of Snizhne in the Donetsk region. Russian state media tried to falsely claim the attack was on a college dormitory. The facility was used as a pilot training school for the Russian Academy of Rocket and Artillery Sciences.

In July 2026, 1st Center of the Unmanned Systems Forces took part in Operation MoLoChKa, targeting Russian shadow fleet vessels in the Sea of Azov and Black Sea.

== Structure ==
- 1st UAV Battalion
- 2nd UAV Battalion
- 3rd UAV Battalion

== Commanders ==
- Callsign “Fidel” (2022-2023)
- Callsign "Charlie" (2023-)
