= Bober (drone) =

Ukrainian long-range UAV

General information
- Type: Unmanned aerial vehicle
- National origin: Ukraine
- Primary user: Main Directorate of Intelligence

History
- First flight: 2023; 3 years ago

The UJ-26 Bober (Ukrainian: Бобер, lit. 'Beaver') is a type of Ukrainian long-range one-way attack drone.

== History ==
In December 2022 the Telegram account Lachen Pyshe announced a public fundraising campaign called Hovor Khell, for a domestic unmanned aerial vehicle for Ukraine's Main Directorate of Intelligence (HUR).

On 11 May 2023 it published photographs and said that it had already been used to accrue losses by Russian forces during the Russo-Ukrainian War.

On 30 May, it was used to conduct a series of drone strikes in suburban Moscow.

The drone reportedly has a range of 600 to 1,000 km, and its warhead is a KZ-6 shaped charge.

== Operational deployment ==
This drone has been used during a number of attacks on Moscow. During July and August 2023 a number of drones struck the IQ-quarter high-rise buildings in Moscow two days in a row.

Other attacks occurred in July and May, possibly including the Kremlin drone attack. Other drones have also been identified as being involved. However images appeared on social media in late July matching footage taken from other videos online.

The Bober drone appear to have a rear-mounted pusher propeller and potentially has a sensor package in the nose. The drone was commissioned at the request of the Ukrainian military intelligence agency the HUR, who asked Ihor Lachenkov, in December 2022, for a "drone that can fly very far". His fundraising put some 20 million hryvnia (half a million dollars) towards its development. Images were released publicly in July and these images match footage taken by Russians over Ilyinsky, Moscow Oblast, on 30 May 2023.

These drones may be vulnerable to Russian electronic warfare which is often cited as having "suppressed" such drones. However, even if true, the drone will still crash into something with an explosive payload.

The emphasis on the use of drones like the Bober go to a comment from the Ukrainian President Volodymyr Zelenskyy, who said on 30 July 2023 that "gradually, the war is returning to the territory of Russia – to its symbolic centers and military bases, and this is an inevitable, natural and absolutely fair process". Russian milbloggers have also been critical of the lack of protection against such attacks.

On 9 July 2024, Ukrainian Bober drones struck a Russian missile testing facility at Kapustin Yar. Russian officials claimed more than 20 drones were shot down, while one black painted Bober drone crashed landed in a field. Subsequent satellite images showed scorch marks at the facility.

== See also ==
- FP-1 (UAV) – Ukrainian long-range one-way attack drone
- UJ-25 Skyline – Ukrainian unmanned aerial vehicle
- Peklo – Ukrainian loitering munition
- Sting (drone) – Ukrainian anti-drone loitering munition
