= Wild Hornets =

Ukrainian defense technology company

Wild Hornets Charitable Fund
- Type: non-profit
- Industry: Defense industry
- Founded: 2023; 3 years ago
- Headquarters: Ukraine
- Website: wildhornets.com

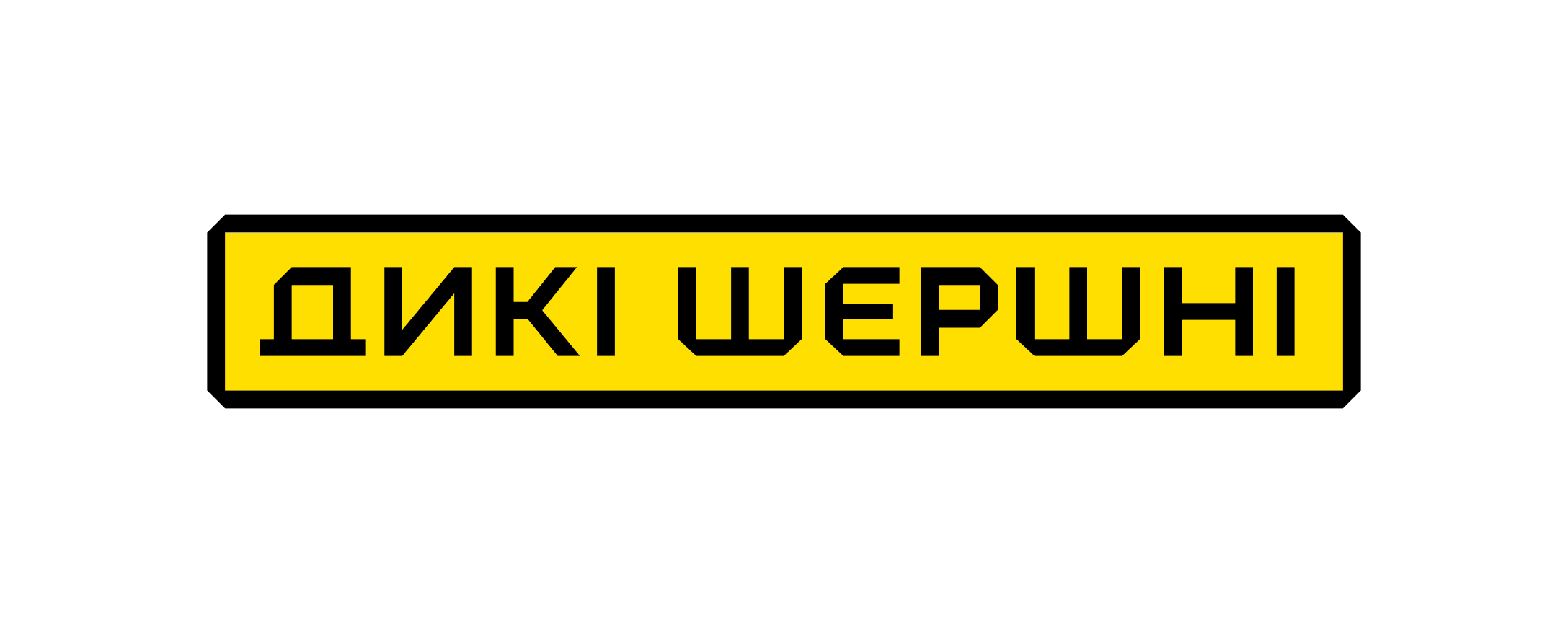
A 'Wild Hornets Charitable Fund' logo

The Wild Hornets Charitable Fund (Ukrainian: Дикі шершні, romanized: Dyki shershni) is a Ukrainian non-profit charity with the purpose of fabricating combat and support drones for the Armed Forces of Ukraine fighting the Russian invasion of Ukraine. Created in spring 2023 by engineers working with the anti-tank unit of the Separate Presidential Brigade, drones from the Wild Hornets organization have been seen in use by several units of both the armed forces of Ukraine and the Main Directorate of Intelligence (Ukraine).

The group has risen to prominence due to the creation of several innovative drone systems for the side of Ukraine, including the "Queen Hornet" FPV heavy bomber drone, the "Sting" anti-air FPV drone and the incendiary "Wild Dragon".

The group has also filmed experimental drones attached with automatic weapons and rocket launchers and claims to have already fielded FPV drones with Artificial intelligence capabilities.

Unlike other Ukrainian manufacturers, Wild Hornets describes itself as a non-profit instead of a company, and depends on private donations instead of state funding.

== History ==
In February 2023 a member of Ukraine's Separate Presidential Brigade asked Wild Hornet's co-founder Dmytro Prodanyuk, then member of the volunteer organization "Svoboda Ukraine", if his volunteer organization could supply FPV drones to the brigade. Podanyuk along with other four volunteers, some of those being engineers, set forward to create such drones.

The drones became instantly popular with the drone units within the Brigade, which in turn made them ask for more drones. Needing funding for the production of more drones, the group turned to a fundraiser organized by Ukrainian journalist Yurii Butusov, who, while initially skeptic, eventually confirmed the legitimacy of the group and launched a fundraiser that gathered 1.7 million Hyrvnia ($46,000) for the Wild Hornets and other fundraisers since then.

Drones manufactured by the Wild Hornets have seen action in every front of the conflict since their creation in 2023. First used by the Separate Presidential Brigade, Wild Hornet drones have been used by the 1st Tank Brigade (Ukraine) during the 2023 Ukrainian counteroffensive. The Bulava unit of the Separate Presidential Brigade used Wild Hornet drones to stop a russian counteroffensive in Urozhaine, recaptured during the offensive.

In 2024, Wild Hornet drones have also been seen during the Battle of Avdiivka (2023–2024), resulting in the visually confirmed losses of 9 tanks and 12 Infantry Fighting Vehicles. In February, the group released a video of the Bulava unit using their drones to destroy a Russian-occupied warehouse, resulting in the destruction of several vehicles, including a T-72 and a BMPT Terminator. With the fall of Avdiivka, the drones began to be used to slow the Russian advance in the Pokrovsk offensive, also being used for drone interception, with the group releasing a video of over a hundred Russian reconnaissance drones being downed by Wild Hornet FPV drones. In early September combat footage of a dragon drone has been released by the Bulava unit (then operating in Zaporizhzhia Oblast).

In September 2024, Wild Hornet drones have been seen used to recapture the aggregate plant during the Battle of Vovchansk, Wild Hornet Drones were also used by the 95th Air Assault Brigade (Ukraine) during the 2024 Kursk offensive.

In March of 2025, Fox News mistakenly labeled a Wild Hornets Sting Interceptor as American made. During coverage of the War between Iran, Israel, and the United States, Fox News they aired footage of a Sting destroying a Russian-launched Shahed drone. The segment incorrectly labeled the interceptor as “American high-tech arsenal” downing Iranian drones.

Following successful Iranian drone attacks on US military assets, the US military asked for Ukrainian help to deploy interceptors.

== Additive manufacturing ==
Wild Hornets have become an industry leader in 3D printing of drones. The drones utilize 65% locally sourced material, and the team of approximately 25 engineers can produce 100 drones a day. Rows Elegoo and Bambu Lab FDM 3D printers are used to produce plastic parts.

== Wild Hornet Drones ==
Multiple offensive and Interceptor drones have been created by the Wild Hornets team. This has combined to over two billions in damages to Russian military equipment and installations.

=== Wild Hornet ===
The Standard Wild Hornet is a Kamikaze FPV drone. It has a payload of 3-6 pounds and can reach speeds of 100 mph.

=== Queen Hornet ===
The Queen Hornet is a 17-inch FPV bomber drone designed to transport a 9 kg (20 lb) payload of multiple bombs up to a range of 20 km (12 mi), with a planned service life of 10 to 30 sorties.

General characteristics

- Capacity: up to 9 kg (20 lb), optimally 6 kg (13 lb)

Performance

- Maximum speed: 160 km/h (99 mph, 86 kn)
- Cruise speed: 70–80 km/h (43–50 mph, 38–43 kn)
- Range: 20 km (12 mi, 11 nmi) one-way
- Combat range: 15 km (9.3 mi, 8.1 nmi) round-trip
- Endurance: up to 25 minutes
- Service ceiling: 2,000 m (6,600 ft)

=== Sting ===
The Sting can reach flight speeds of 100 mph (160 km/h) and cruise at an altitude of 10,000 ft (3,000 m). It has a 3-D printed frame. Cost estimates for a Sting range from $1,000-$5,000 depending on optics and payload. The Sting uses Kurbas thermal imaging cameras from Odd Systems.

In May 2025, the Sting air-defense interceptor from the Wild Hornets downed a Shahed drone, "marking a breakthrough in frontline drone defense".

In July 2025, Ukrainian activist Serhii Sternenko claimed that the Wild Hornets interceptors funded by his charity had already downed more than 100 Shahed drones.

In October 2025, Sting interceptor drones destroyed over 1,000 enemy UAVs. In October 2025 the Ukrainian Air Force (PS ZSU) shoots down about 80% of Russian drones of all types.

As per March 6, 2026, the Sting have destroyed over 3,900 Geran drones.

The monthly production rate is over 10,000 units per month in March 2026.

=== Wild Dragon ===
Wild Hornets manufactures the Wild Dragon under contract with an unrelated Ukrainian private company named Steel Hornets. Wild Dragon drones are equipped with a thermite payload.
