= Palianytsia (missile) =

Ukrainian cruise missile

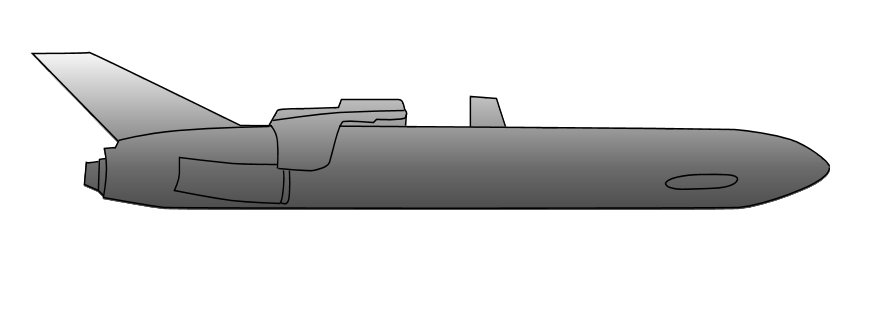
- Type: Turbojet drone
- Place of origin: Ukraine

Service history
- In service: 2024
- Used by: Ukraine
- Wars: Russo-Ukrainian War

Production history
- Designer: Luch Design Bureau
- Manufacturer: Ukroboronprom
- Produced: 2024

Specifications
- Mass: 320 kg
- Engine: turbojet
- Operational range: 650 km
- Flight altitude: 15–500 m
- Maximum speed: 900 km/h
- Guidance system: INS, GPS

Palianytsia (Ukrainian: Паляниця, pronounced [pɐlʲɐˈnɪtsʲɐ]) is a Ukrainian turbojet drone missile system developed by Ukraine during the Russian invasion of Ukraine.

== Naming ==
The word palianytsia (a hearth-baked bread) is a shibboleth that has been used to unmask foreign agents in Ukraine's armed forces, who are usually unable to pronounce the word correctly.

== Background ==
The weapon, a cross between a missile and a drone, took 18 months from original design to production. As it is produced in Ukraine, it sidestepped the prohibitions on using Western weapons to strike deep into Russia. The Palianytsia drone hit targets up to 600 miles from the front line, and reportedly has a hypothetical maximum range of 1200 miles.

== Description ==
On Ukraine's Independence Day (24 August 2024) Ukrainian President Zelenskyy unveiled the "missile-drone" as "a new class of weaponry" that is difficult to counter and that had already been used against Russian military targets. The unveiling came after Ukrainian authorities claimed responsibility for a strike on an ammunition depot in Voronezh Oblast that media connected with the Palianytsia.

The surface-launched missile features a central body with forward-positioned wings and a tail section equipped with four control surfaces, giving it a visual appearance of a cruise missile. According to the advisor to the head of the Office of the President of Ukraine Mykhailo Podolyak, the missile has a range of 600–700 km.

Two named defense analysts estimate that the Palyanytsya has a warhead of "a few tens of kilograms", i.e. considerably less than a traditional cruise missile. Another analyst believes the warhead weighs 50 kg, while a Ukrainian reserve colonel estimates the warhead to be several hundred kilograms.

According to Defense Express, on September 2, 2025, the Palianytsia weighs 320 kilograms, including up to 100 kilograms of payload. Its maximum range is 650 kilometers, with an operational altitude between 15 and 500 meters, and a cruising speed of 900 kilometers per hour.

The system is guided by GPS and an inertial navigation system. Launch is carried out with a solid rocket booster, which is jettisoned before switching to the main propulsion of a turbojet engine.

The Palyanytsya measures 3.5 meters in length with a wingspan of 1.7 meters.

=== Propulsion ===
Although the Palyanytsya has been termed a rocket drone, it is powered by a turbojet engine.

According to military correspondent David Axe, the Palyanytsya is powered by an AI-PBS-350 jet-engine jointly developed by Czech PBS Velká Bíteš and Ukrainian Ivchenko-Progress SE. The AI-PBS-350 is optimized for single use munitions, weighs 51 kg, has an outer diameter of 298 mm, a length of 706 mm, and produces 3400 N of thrust. The engine's specific fuel consumption is 0.125 kg/N/h; i.e. at full thrust the consumption is 425 kg/h.

== Production ==
On 28 August 2024, Minister for Digital Transformation Mykhailo Fedorov stated that the Palyanytsya costs less than US$1 million. A Ukrainian reserve colonel estimates the cost to be $50 000 to $100 000, i.e. much less than traditional Western cruise missiles that cost upwards of one million USD.

On 6 September 2024, Oleksandr Kamyshin stated to The Kyiv Independent that Lithuania would contribute 10 million Euro to build Palianytsia systems.

On 4 December 2024, Rustem Umerov (then the Defence Minister of Ukraine) announced that the Palianytsia missile-drone had entered serial production.

== Operational history ==
Palyanytsya's unveiling came on 24 August 2024 with the claim that the missile had already been used against unspecified Russian military targets that media speculated included an ammunition depot in Voronezh Oblast.

On 18 and 21 September 2024, UAVs caused the Toropets depot explosions and explosions at an ammunition storage facility at Tikhoretsk as well as at the Tikhoretsk air base. In part based on reports of jet engines being heard by Russians during the attacks, military correspondent David Axe subsequently reasoned that the attacks were done with Palianytsia.

According to Volodymyr Zelenskyy the strikes carried out on the Novorossiysk Port in 11 August 2026 were done using Palianytsia in conjunction with Neptune missiles and unmanned naval vehicles.

In the November 2026 Crimean Bridge strike Palianytsia missiles hit the road bridge section resulting in its collapse.

== See also ==
- Trembita (cruise missile) – Ukrainian cruise missile
- Peklo – Ukrainian loitering munition
- UJ-25 Skyline – Ukrainian unmanned aerial vehicle
- MAGURA V5 – Ukrainian unmanned boat
- R-360 Neptune – Ukrainian family of cruise missiles
- Sea Baby – Ukrainian unmanned surface vehicle
- Flamingo (missile) – Ukrainian cruise missile
