= UJ-25 Skyline =

Ukrainian unmanned aerial vehicle

- Type: Loitering munition
- Place of origin: Ukraine

Production history
- Designer: UkrJet

The UJ-25 Skyline (Ukrainian: Ска́йлайн) is a jet-powered loitering munition manufactured by the Ukrainian company UkrJet in service with the Armed Forces of Ukraine.

== Design ==
The UJ-25 is a weaponized version of the Ukrjet UJ-23 Topaz target drone. Both aircraft have missile-like main bodies, forward-swept wings, V-tail configurations, and top-mounted air intakes at the rear of the fuselage feeding into a turbojet engine; the UJ-25 differs outwardly only by having forward canards.

Although the Skyline's specifications are not known, the Topaz has a cruise speed of 600 km/h (370 mph), a top speed of 800 km/h (500 mph), endurance of 90 minutes, and a mission radius of 400 km (250 mi) with a payload weight of 10 kg (22 lb) and is guided either by manual control link or by following a preprogrammed route.

As a one-way kamikaze drone, the UJ-25 could have a strike range of around 800 km (500 mi), long enough to reach Moscow. Its jet propulsion makes it harder to counter than piston engine Shahed-136 drones used by Russia, as its faster speed combined with relatively small size and low-observable characteristics reduces the reaction time for air defenses to attempt to intercept it.

== Usage ==
The UJ-25 was first shown publicly in September 2023 in the background of a CNN interview about drone warfare during the Russian invasion of Ukraine.

Its first known combat use was on 22 December 2023 when one crashed into the roof of a house and failed to detonate in the Russian-occupied Ukrainian city of Berdyansk in eastern Zaporizhzhia Oblast.

== See also ==
- Trembita (cruise missile) – Ukrainian cruise missile
- AQ-400 Scythe
- Palianytsia (missile) – Ukrainian cruise missile
- Peklo – Ukrainian loitering munition
- Shahed-238 – Iranian unmanned aerial combat vehicles
- FP-5 Flamingo – Ukrainian cruise missile
- Sting (drone) – Ukrainian anti-drone loitering munition
