= Sheshnaag-150 =

Indian long-range one-way attack drone

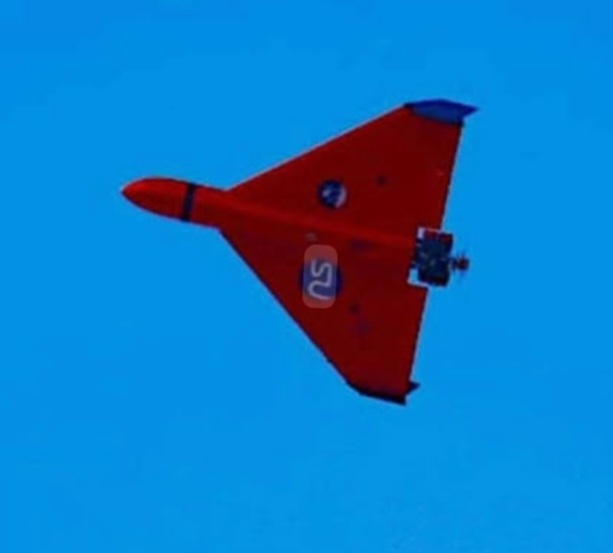
- Type: Loitering munition; One-way attack drone
- Place of origin: India

Service history
- Used by: Indian Army (Intended); Indian Air Force (Intended)

Production history
- Designer: NewSpace Research and Technologies (NRT)
- Developed from: Shahed 136

Specifications
- Mass: 150 kg (330 lb)
- Warhead: High-explosive fragmentation
- Warhead weight: 25–40 kg (55–88 lb)
- Operational range: 1,000 km (620 mi) with 5 hours endurance

The Sheshnaag-150 is an Indian, long-range, swarming one-way attack drone, developed by the Bengaluru-based private company NewSpace Research & Technologies. The design is comparable to the Iranian origin Shahed 136 and the US LUCAS drones.

== History ==
=== Background ===
The use of loitering munitions has seen an increased usage and effectiveness during the Nagorno-Karabakh conflict, the Red Sea crisis, the Russian invasion of Ukraine in 2022 and other conflicts. The type of drones were also used during the 2025 India–Pakistan conflict. This made the indigenous development of such platforms necessary.

=== Development ===
Sheshnaag-150 made its public debut during the Aero India 2025. The drone will be offered to all the branch of the Indian Armed Forces. It is part of the larger Sheshnaag programme of the NewSpace Research & Technologies (NRT). The startup is developing a family of one-way attack UAVs under the programme with a strike range of 15–1,000 km (9.3–621.4 mi).

The development, originally an internal project of NRT, was fast-tracked following Operation Sindoor when the leadership of the start up was summoned by the Indian military. (Note: It is developed by NRT.)

== Design ==
The drone is being developed as a collaborative attack swarming system from scratch. The swarm strategy is being adopted to overwhelm enemy air defences and undertake precision strikes. The indigenously developed software and connective systems can autonomously track, detect and destroy adversary targets including infrastructure, vehicles or personnel. It can deliver 25–40 kg (55–88 lb) warhead at a ranges exceeding 1,000 km (620 mi).

== Trials ==
The first flight of the drone was completed by February 2025 from the Chitradurga Aeronautical Test Range.

Another trial was undertaken during April 2026 at the Pokhran Test Range without a live warhead. The trial demonstrated a strike range of over 700 km (430 mi) and validated its coordinated swarm attacks, controlled terminal strike, and reliable long-distance flight performance.

== See also ==
=== Related development ===
- Nagastra-1
- HAL Combat Air Teaming System
- HAL CATS Warrior
- DRDO Nishant

=== Aircraft of comparable role, configuration, and era ===
- HESA Shahed 136 – (Iran)
- Low-cost Uncrewed Combat Attack System - (USA)
