= PLargonia =

Polish combat drone

PLargonia is a Polish long-range combat drone developed jointly by the Polish Air Force Institute of Technology and Poland's Center for Autonomous Systems. It is intended to serve as an airborne target as well as a one-way attack drone similar to the Shahed series of drones.

== Design ==
Described as Poland's "National Combat Drone", the PLargonia is similar in design to the Shahed 131 and 136. Its similarities enable it to be used as a stand-in for Shahed drones in air defence training, or to serve as a Polish equivalent for one-way attack missions. The drone has a cruising speed of 185 km/h and a maximum range of up to 900 km when carrying a 16 kg warhead. It is powered by a 342i B4 TS piston engine producing 24 kW (32 hp), with a rear-mounted propeller. With a wingspan of around 2.2 meters and being 2.6 meters long, the PLargonia is the same size as the Shahed 131. Integration of the PLargonia into the Polish Armed Forces will be led by the Center for Autonomous Systems.
