= Iran–Ukraine relations =

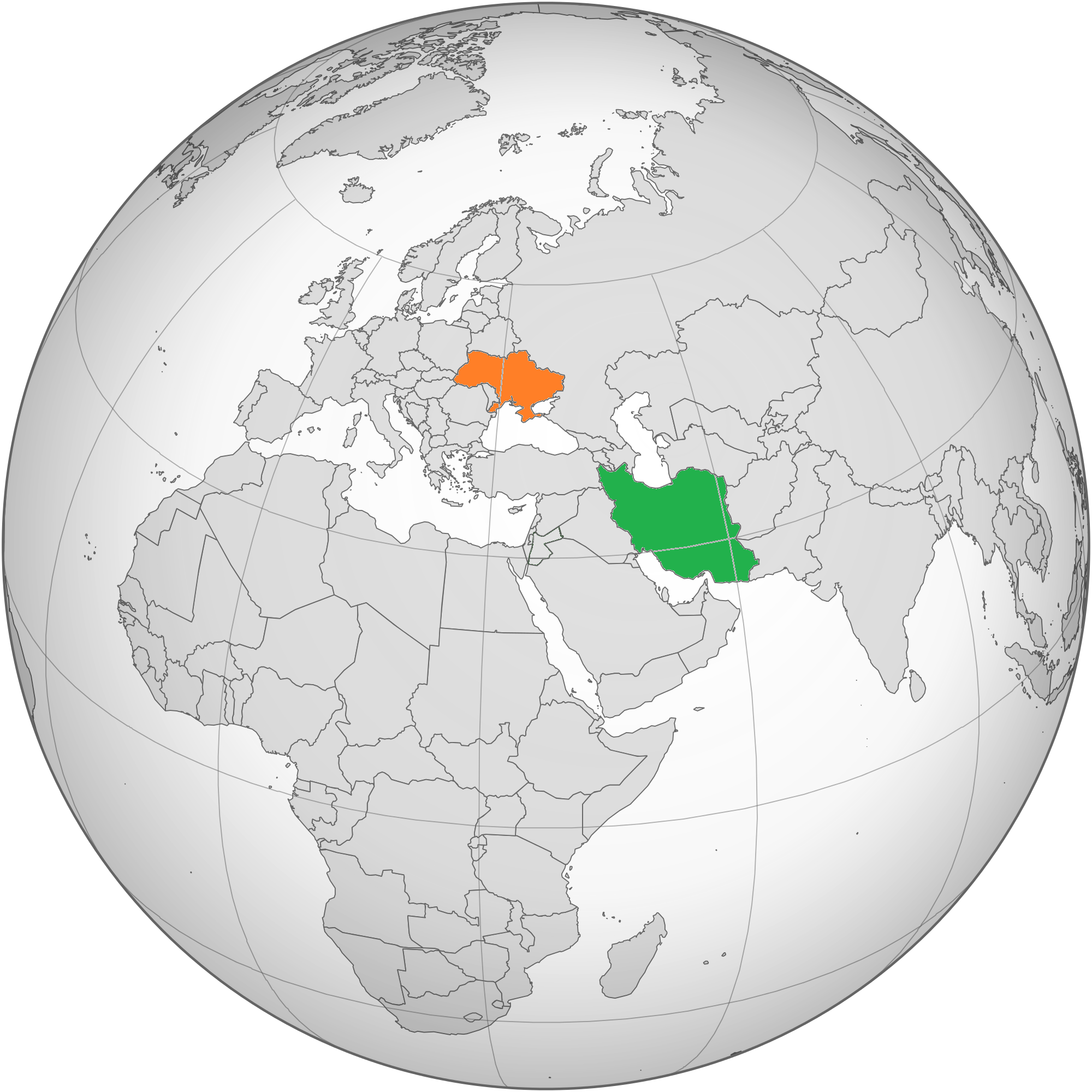

- Iran: Ukraine

Diplomatic mission
- Embassy of Iran, Kyiv: Embassy of Ukraine, Tehran

The Islamic Republic of Iran and Ukraine established formal diplomatic relations on 22 January 1992. Iran recognized Ukraine as an independent sovereign state on 25 December 1991, four months after the Ukrainian SSR issued the Act of Declaration of Independence of Ukraine amidst the dissolution of the Soviet Union. Iran has an embassy in Ukraine's Kyiv, and Ukraine has an embassy in Iran's Tehran. The two countries enjoyed a generally cordial relationship with each other until January 2020, when Iran's Islamic Revolutionary Guard Corps shot down Ukraine International Airlines Flight 752, killing all of the 176 civilians onboard.

Iran's support for the Russian invasion of Ukraine since 24 February 2022 has drawn Ukrainian condemnation. The Iranian government has supported Russia on the international stage and later became a chief supplier of armaments to the Russian military in light of international sanctions against Russia and Belarus. Additionally, Russia's usage of the Iranian Shahed 131 and Shahed 136, especially against Ukrainian civilians, has led to increasingly negative rhetoric towards Iran from the Western world.

In early 2023, Ukraine downgraded diplomatic ties and imposed long-term sanctions against Iran due to the Iranian government's support in the Russian invasion of Ukraine, including a complete ban on bilateral trade for 50 years.

== History ==
=== Dissolution of the Soviet Union ===
On 25 December 1991, Iran officially recognized the independence of Ukraine. Diplomatic relations between Ukraine and Iran were established on 22 January 1992 with the signing of the 'Protocol on the Establishment of Diplomatic Relations between Ukraine and the Islamic Republic of Iran. In January 1992, the Embassy of Iran in Kyiv began operations and in October of the same year, the Embassy of Ukraine in Tehran also began its operations.

From 25 to 26 April 1992, at the invitation of the President of Iran Akbar Hashemi-Rafsanjani, President of Ukraine Leonid Kravchuk paid a visit to Iran, where both the leaders signed the 'Declaration on the Principles of Friendly Cooperation between Ukraine and Islamic Republic of Iran'. The declaration stated that both countries will develop their relations as friendly states and equal partners, while being guided by the principles of respect for the sovereignty of both countries, the inviolability of borders, territorial integrity and non-interference in each other's internal affairs.

=== Downing of Flight 752 by the Islamic Revolutionary Guards ===
On 8 January 2020, the Iranian military accidentally shot down Ukraine International Airlines Flight 752, straining relations between the two countries. On 11 January, the President of Ukraine Volodymyr Zelenskyy called on the Iranian government to bring those responsible for the plane crash to justice and to discuss the issue of compensation. On 20 January 2020, an Iranian delegation headed by the special envoy of the President of Iran, Minister of Roads and Urban Development Mohammad Eslami arrived in Kyiv, where he met with Foreign Minister of Ukraine Vadym Prystaiko. The parties spoke about the need for a comprehensive and objective investigation of the Flight 752 shootdown.

=== Iran and the Russo-Ukrainian War ===
Iran does not recognize the 2014 Russian annexation of Crimea and considers Crimea an integral part of Ukraine. In 2016, a meeting of the Ukrainian-Iranian joint commission on trade and economic cooperation was held for the first time. A mechanism was launched to simplify the procedure for obtaining Ukrainian visas by Iranian citizens. On the same year, the visit of the Minister of Energy and Coal Industry of Ukraine Ihor Nasalyk to Iran contributed to the agreements on the transit of Iranian energy carriers to the European Union through the territory of Ukraine. The mechanism of political consultations at the level of deputy foreign ministers of both states was resumed.

==== Iranian support for Russia's invasion of Ukraine ====
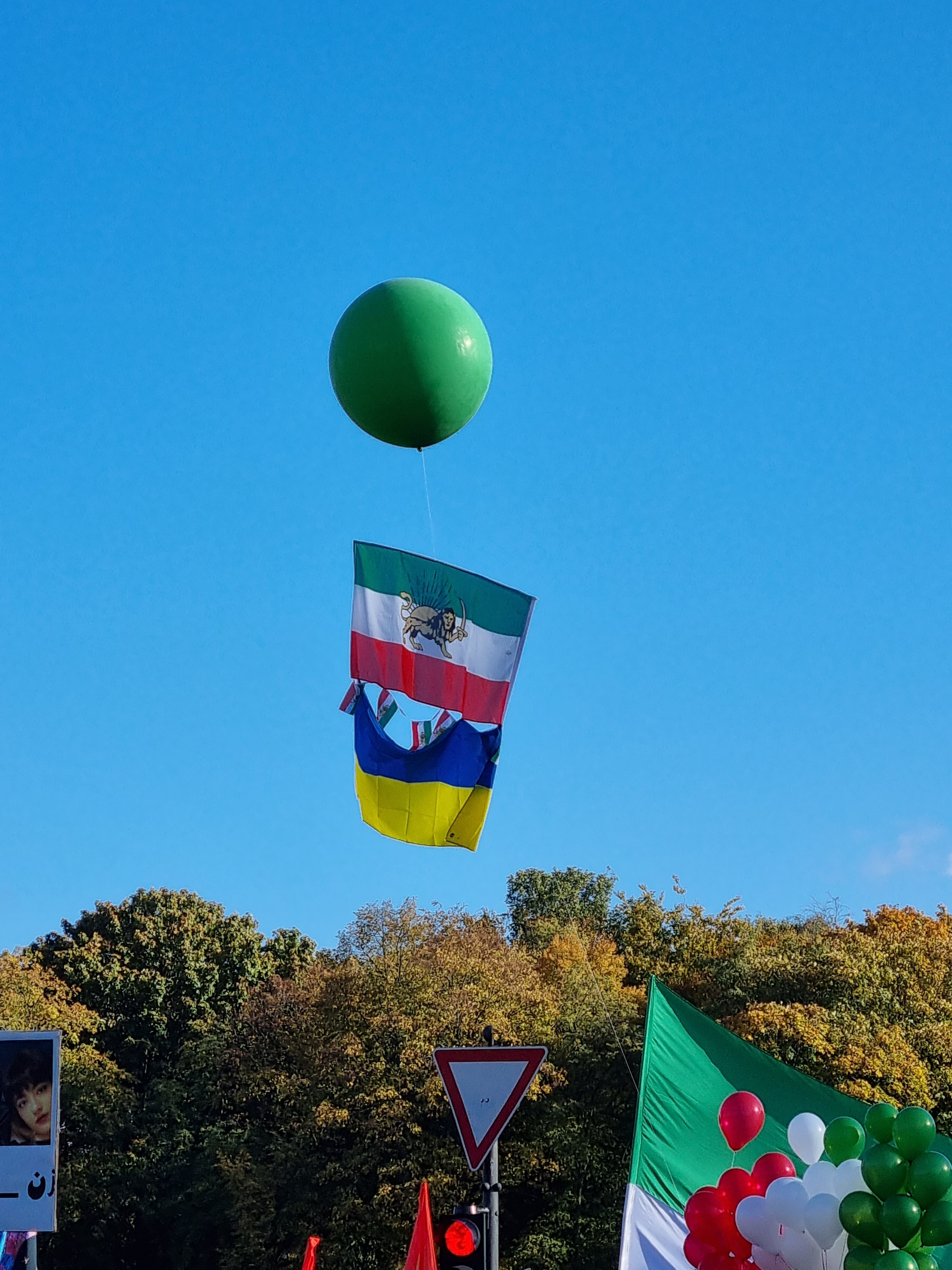
Flag of Iran's Lion and Sun intertwined with a flag of Ukraine, flown at an Iranian anti–Islamic Republic rally in the city of Berlin, October 2022

On 24 February 2022, Russia invaded Ukraine in a major escalation of the Russo-Ukrainian War that began in 2014. On 2 March, Iran abstained in the United Nations General Assembly Resolution ES-11/1 which deplored Russia's invasion and demanded a full withdrawal of Russian forces and on 7 April, voted against United Nations General Assembly Resolution ES-11/3 which suspended the membership of Russia in the United Nations Human Rights Council.

During a visit to Tehran in July 2022, Vladimir Putin received staunch support from Iran over his invasion of Ukraine, with the Supreme Leader Ali Khamenei saying that if Russia had not sent troops into Ukraine, it would have faced an attack from NATO later, echoing Putin's own rhetoric.

Despite official statements in July 2022 that Iran would not supply Russia or Ukraine with military equipment during the war and downplaying the United States' assessment that Iran was preparing to transfer combat drones to Russia, Iranian-supplied suicide drones were being used by Russia against Ukraine from September 2022. On 23 September 2022 Ukraine revoked the accreditation of the Iranian ambassador to Ukraine Manouchehr Moradi and decided to reduce Iran's diplomatic presence in Ukraine to protest Iran's drone deliveries to Russia, calling it an "unfriendly act that deals a serious blow to relations between Ukraine and Iran".

Despite blaming NATO and the United States for instigating the war, the Iranian government called for a political solution to the conflict. However, many Iranians protested against the Russian invasion and criticised the government's stance in the conflict, resulting in a massive debate in Iran regarding the invasion. On 27 February 2022, a group of Iranians assembled outside of the Ukrainian Embassy in Tehran on Saturday to protest the Russian invasion, where they chanted "Death to Putin", until they were dispersed by the police. On 26 February, the Iranian conservative newspaper Kayhan published an editorial in response to the invasion stating that in the past decades the United States has abandoned several of its allies after pushing them into crises, while an editorial by Jomhouri-e Eslami stated that the stances declared by Iranian officials about the invasion contradict the principles of Iran, and demanded that they clearly condemn Russia's warmongering and to settle disputes via dialogue. The contradictory views expressed by two newspapers published by the office of the Supreme Leader of Iran Ali Khamenei suggest that Khamenei is trying to balance the government's stances toward the Russo-Ukrainian war.

Iranian politicians such as reformist Sadegh Zibakalam, former presidents Mahmoud Ahmadinejad and Mohammad Khatami and diplomat Seyed Hossein Mousavian have condemned the invasion and offered support to Ukraine. Iranian film actor Hamid Farrokhnezhad, who is well known for his role in the 2006 movie Fireworks Wednesday, posted a video which was widely circulated via social media where he denounced the Russian invasion of Ukraine in social media as "brutal attack". In the video, he also stated that he returned the best actor award he received from the Moscow Film Festival in 2005 for his role in the 2004 anti-war drama film Big Drum Under Left Foot to protest the invasion. Actor Babak Karimi compared the Russian invasion to the 1980 Iraqi invasion of Iran, which sparked the Iran–Iraq War.

On 14 March 2026, Iran threatened Ukraine over Ukraine's drone assistance to Israel.

==== Ukrainian retaliatory measures ====
Due to the fact that the Islamic Republic of Iran, despite its official neutral stance, is supplying Russia with drones that are used for attacks in Ukraine, Ukraine's president Zelenskyy announced in September 2022 that the accreditation of the Iranian ambassador will be revoked and the number of diplomatic staff of the Iranian embassy in Kyiv significantly reduced. Dmytro Kuleba, Minister of Foreign Affairs of Ukraine, has also suggested to Volodymyr Zelenskyy to break formal relations with Iran; this is because of recent attacks on Ukrainian territory with drones made in Iran.

On 24 November 2022, secretary of the National Security and Defense Council of Ukraine, Oleksiy Danilov, confirmed that Ukrainian forces had killed Iranian military advisors in occupied Crimea during an October strike. A report from Jerusalem Post on October 10 put the number of killed at 10. Oleksiys confirmation came after US National Security Council Spokesperson John Kirby on 20 October confirmed that Iranian military personnel were in Crimea to assist Russian troops operating Iranian made drones in attacks on Ukrainian civilians and civilian infrastructure. Oleksiy also threatened that Ukraine would target any Iranian military presence in Ukrainian territory.

In June 2023, Ukraine imposed sanctions on Iran for 50 years, in response to the Iran's military support for Russia. The sanctions include a complete ban on trading, investments and technology transfer.

In July 2023, following the Three Islands (Abu Musa and the Greater and Lesser Tunbs) dispute between Iran and the United Arab Emirates, Russian diplomats called for negotiations on the status of the islands near the Strait of Hormuz that Iran considers its own which are also contested by the United Arab Emirates. In a retaliatory attempt, Iranian Foreign Minister Hossein Amir-Abdollahian issued a statement that Iran supports Ukraine's territorial integrity.

Ukraine supported Israel and the United States during the Twelve-Day War in June 2025; the Ministry of Foreign Affairs said the two countries' strikes were justified to prevent Iran from developing nuclear weapons. On 1 July, Iran's Ministry of Foreign Affairs summoned Ukraine's chargé d'affaires to warn that Ukraine would face "consequences" if it continued to support Israel.

Following the 2026 Iran massacres, Ukraine designated the Islamic Revolutionary Guard Corps as a terrorist organization on 2 February 2026, citing Iran's crackdown on protestors and Iranian support for the Russian invasion of Ukraine by providing Shahed drones.

On 25 July 2026, Ukraine hit an Iranian vessel in the Caspian Sea carrying military cargo between Iran and Russia while evading international sanctions. Iran claimed the strike hit the ship "Anna" and killed one sailor and injured another. Ukraine's envoy to Israel later said that the vessel was carrying missile and drone components on its way to Iran. During the same operation in the Caspian Sea, SBU announced that it had hit the Filanovsky offshore oil platform, the sanctioned cargo vessel the Port Olya 2, the dry cargo ship Begey and a Russian missile boat. Both Port Olya 2 and Begey had been involved in transporting military cargo between Iran and Russia.

== Public opinion ==
Following Russia's invasion of Ukraine, public attitudes towards Iran shifted: an opinion poll conducted in February–March 2023 by the Razumkov Centre showed that 73.5% of Ukrainians surveyed had a negative view of Iran. In a January 2024 Razumkov Centre opinion poll, 82% of Ukrainians reported a negative attitude towards Iran.

== Resident diplomatic missions ==
- Iran has an embassy in Kyiv.
- Ukraine has an embassy in Tehran.

== See also ==
- Foreign relations of Iran
- Foreign relations of Ukraine
- Ukraine International Airlines Flight 752
