= IG Defence KAL =

Indian long-range one-way attack drone

KAL
- Type: Loitering munition; One-way attack drone
- Place of origin: India

Production history
- Designer: IG Defence
- Manufacturer: IG Defence

Specifications
- Mass: 200 kg (440 lb) maximum take-off weight
- Warhead: High-explosive
- Warhead weight: 50 kg (110 lb)
- Payload capacity: 50 kg (110 lb)
- Operational range: Up to 1,000 km (620 mi)

The IG Defence KAL is an Indian long range one-way attack drone developed by IG Defence, a private defence company based in Noida. The system is made for deep-penetration strike missions, particularly against high value targets, and have a range of up to 1,000 km. It is comparable to Iran's Shahed-136-class one-way attack drones and the U.S. LUCAS (Low-cost Uncrewed Combat Attack System).

== History ==
It was developed as Project KAL before by IG Defence as an indigenous long-range strike drone intended for deep-penetration missions, They first disclosed the project publicly in March 2026, KAL as a long-range one-way attack unmanned aerial vehicle with a projected range of up to 1,000 km and an endurance of three to five hours.

After that they later exhibited KAL at the North Tech Symposium 2026, in Prayagraj in May 2026. company said that the system had completed development and testing and was being considered for export to countries in the Gulf region, pending as subject to the required indian government approvals.
