= Suicide drone =

Suicide drone may refer to:

- Loitering munition
- One-way attack drone
