= USS Santa Barbara (LCS-32) =

Independence-class littoral combat ship of the United States Navy

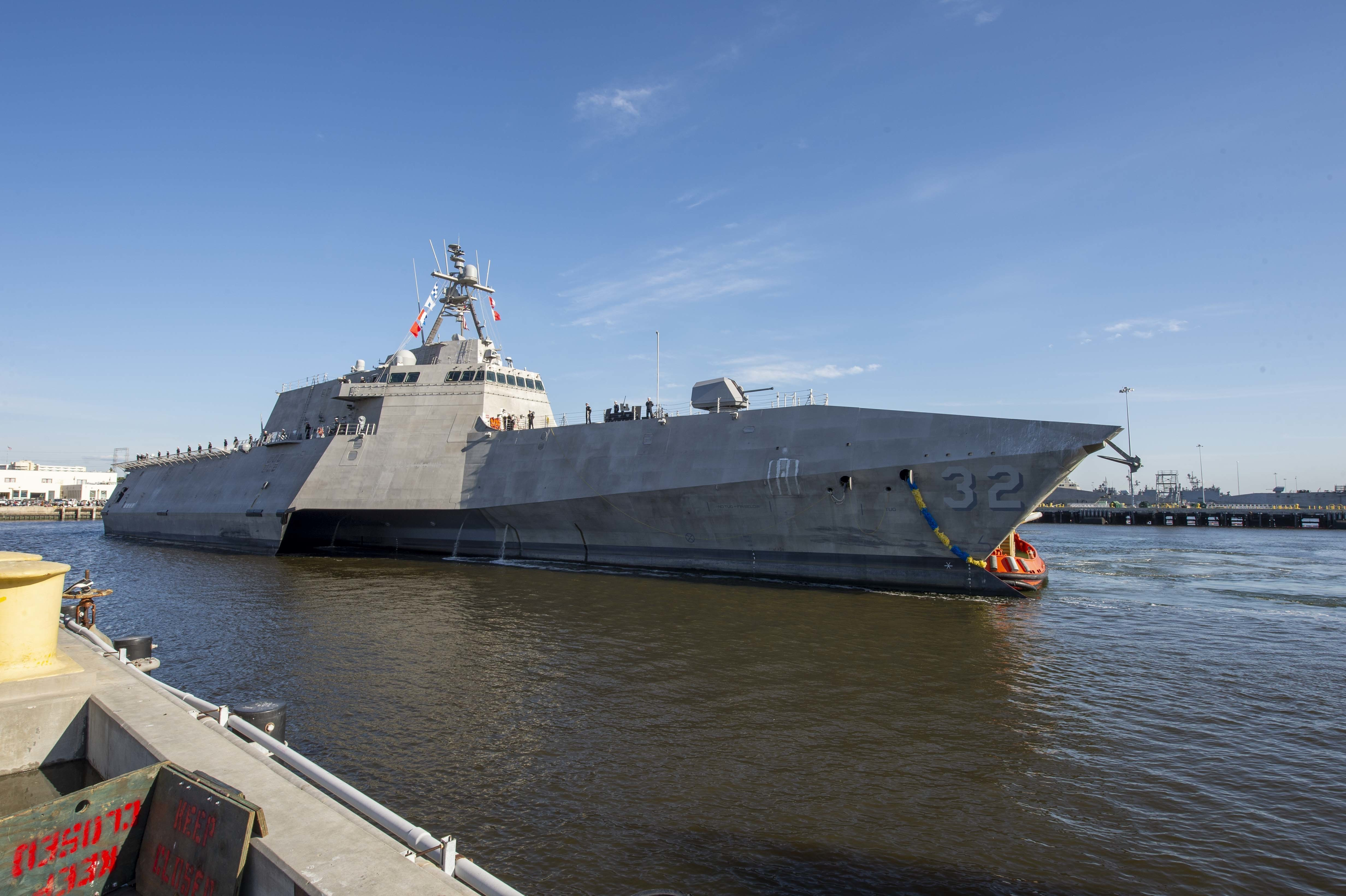
- USS Santa Barbara, January 2023

History

United States
- Name: Santa Barbara
- Namesake: Santa Barbara
- Awarded: 18 September 2018
- Laid down: 27 October 2020
- Launched: 13 November 2021
- Sponsored by: Lolita Zinke
- Christened: 16 October 2021
- Acquired: 21 July 2022
- Commissioned: 1 April 2023
- Home port: Bahrain
- Identification: Hull number: LCS-32
- Motto: Resilient and Determined
- Status: in active service
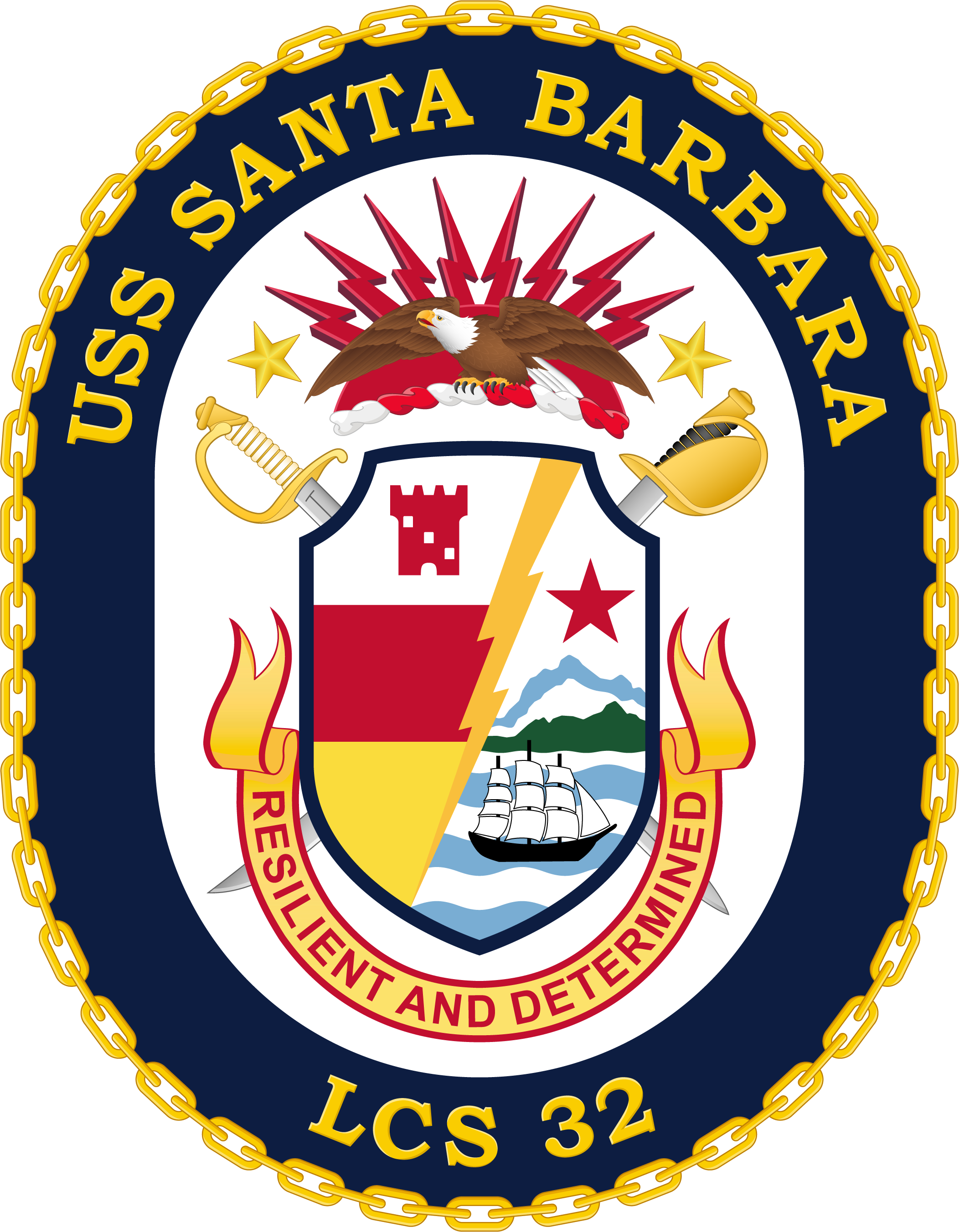
- Badge

General characteristics
- Class & type: Independence-class littoral combat ship
- Displacement: 2,307 metric tons light, 3,104 metric tons full, 797 metric tons deadweight
- Length: 127.4 m (418 ft)
- Beam: 31.6 m (104 ft)
- Draft: 14 ft (4.27 m)
- Propulsion: 2× General Electric LM2500 gas turbines, 2× diesel, 4× waterjets, retractable Azimuth thruster, 4× diesel generators
- Speed: 40 knots (74 km/h; 46 mph)+, 47 knots (54 mph; 87 km/h) sprint
- Range: 4,300 nautical miles (8,000 km; 4,900 mi) at 20 knots (37 km/h; 23 mph)+
- Capacity: 210 tonnes
- Complement: 40 core crew (8 officers, 32 enlisted) plus up to 35 mission crew
- Sensors & processing systems: Sea Giraffe 3D Surface/Air RADAR; Bridgemaster-E Navigational RADAR; AN/KAX-2 EO/IR sensor for GFC
- Electronic warfare & decoys: EDO ES-3601 ESM; 4× SRBOC rapid bloom chaff launchers
- Armament: BAE Systems Mk 110 57 mm gun; 4× .50 cal (12.7 mm) guns (2 aft, 2 forward); Evolved SeaRAM 11 cell missile launcher; Mission modules
- Aircraft carried: 2× MH-60R/S Seahawks

USS Santa Barbara (LCS-32) is an Independence-class littoral combat ship of the United States Navy. She is the 32nd ship of the type, and 16th of the class, which is inter-numbered with the Freedom-class littoral combat ships. With 35 LCSs now active or planned, the type is the Navy's second largest number of surface warfare ships in production, next only to its guided missile destroyers. She is the third US Navy ship to be named for the city of Santa Barbara, California.

== Design and construction ==
In 2002, the United States Navy initiated a program to develop the first of a fleet of littoral combat ships. The Navy initially ordered two trimaran hulled ships from General Dynamics, which became known as the Independence-class after the lead ship of the class, USS Independence. Even-numbered US Navy littoral combat ships are built using the Independence-class trimaran design, while odd-numbered ships are based on a competing design, the conventional monohull Freedom-class. The initial order of littoral combat ships involved a total of four ships, including two of the Independence-class design.

Santa Barbara was built in Mobile, Alabama, by Austal USA. Her keel was laid down on 27 October 2020, she was christened on 16 October 2021 and launched on 13 November 2021. Following the completion of sea trials on 3 June 2022, the ship was accepted by the Navy on 21 July 2022. She was commissioned in a ceremony at Port Hueneme, California on 1 April 2023.

== Service history ==
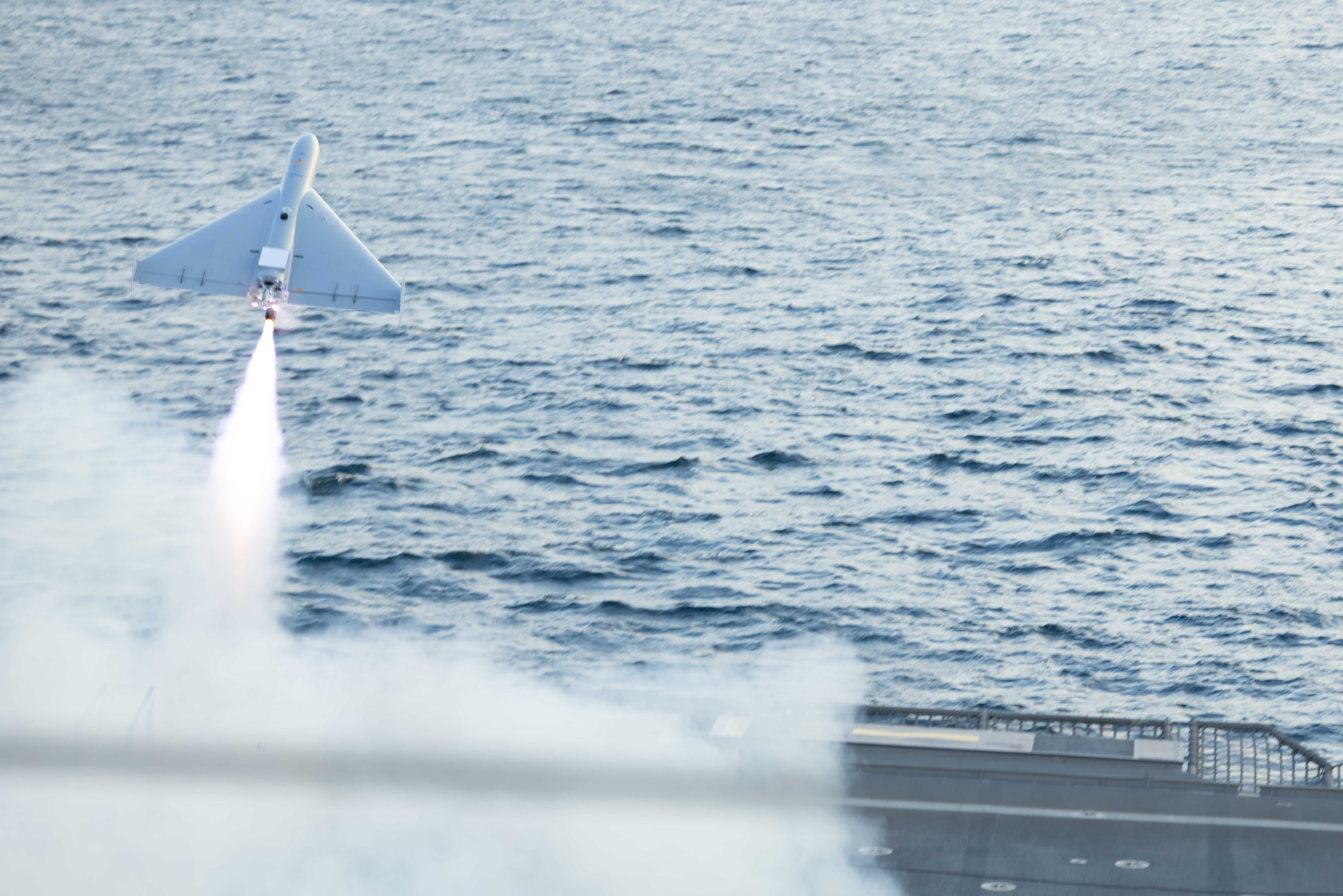
LUCAS, an American reverse-engineered version of the Iranian HESA Shahed 136 one-way attack drone, launching from the USS Santa Barbara

On 16 August 2025, Santa Barbara arrived at the Port of Colombo, Sri Lanka, on a replenishment visit under the command of Commander Adam J. Ochs. The vessel departed the island on 21 August. It planned to deploy in the Persian Gulf with a mine countermeasure mission package. Less than a month later, on 11 September, the Navy announced Commander Ochs had been relieved of command due to a loss of confidence in his ability to command the littoral combat ship.

On 16 December 2025, Santa Barbara test launched a Low-cost Uncrewed Combat Attack System (LUCAS) one-way attack drone, recently developed, at sea for the first time, in the Persian Gulf.

On 28 September 2026 it was reported the Navy’s 418-foot littoral combat vessel experienced serious maintenance issues that plagued it in the weeks before it arrived earlier this month in a Singapore port, according to an undated government contracting document reviewed by The Washington Sun.

“All four engines are currently operating well beyond their maximum recommended operational thresholds, presenting an immediate, critical threat of mechanical failure,” the document states.

Maintenance on the two main propulsion diesel engines and two of the diesel generators that power the ship was “urgently required to prevent catastrophic engine failure, preserve vessel operational readiness, and ensure crew safety,” the contracting document states. The need for critical repairs on the ship comes as the Navy is strained by operational issues stemming from the Iran war, such as the USS Abraham Lincoln’s overextended deployment.
