= One-way attack drone =

Unmanned aerial vehicle designed for direct impact strikes

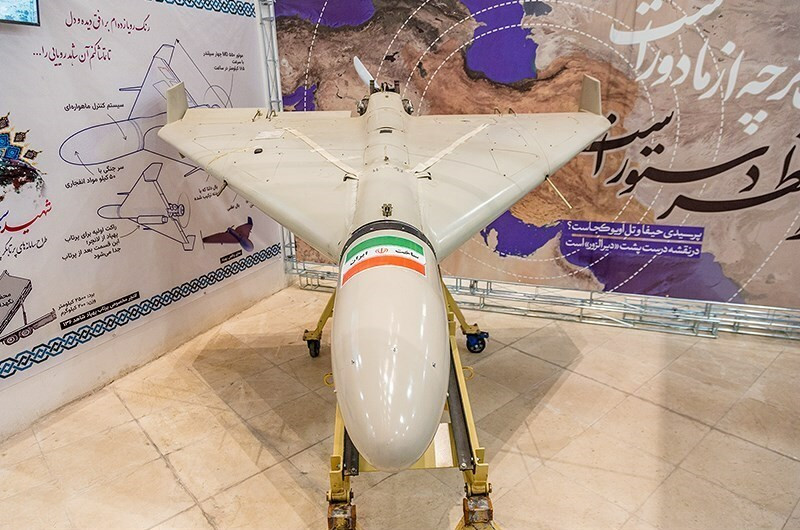
Iranian made HESA Shahed 136

A one-way attack drone (OWA-UAV or OWA drone) is a type of self-destructive unmanned aerial vehicle (UAV) designed to strike a target by crashing into it with an integrated warhead. Common terms like suicide drone, kamikaze drone or exploding drone are used. These types of drones self-destruct, similar to loitering munitions. However, loitering munitions typically feature human-in-the-loop control and the ability to loiter or "hunt" for targets before striking remotely by a human operator. On the other hand, one-way attack drones are often launched against pre-programmed coordinates. One-way attack drone guidance systems vary by model. One type of one-way attack drone uses satellite positioning to attack static targets and lacks the electro-optical targeting sensor or data links required for terminal guidance by a human operator. Another type of one-way attack drone uses artificial intelligence (AI) with electro-optical targeting sensors for more precise attacks even when it still lacks a human operator for terminal guidance. They are frequently described by defense analysts as a cost-effective and slower alternative of cruise missiles rather than traditional drones.

The term gained significant prominence during the Russo-Ukrainian war, particularly with the widespread use of the Iranian-designed HESA Shahed 136 by Russian forces (under the designation Geran-2).

== Terminology and distinction ==
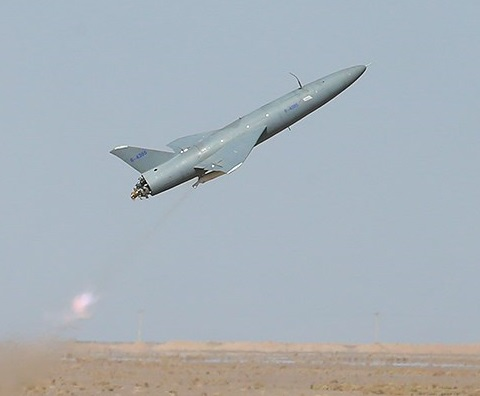
Iranian Arash one-way attack drone

The terms "one-way attack drone" and "loitering munition" are often used interchangeably in media reports. However, defense analysts and military doctrines have increasingly sought to distinguish OWA-UAVs as a separate category.

The primary distinction lies in the concept of operations (CONOPS) and guidance:

- Loitering Munitions (LM): Systems like the IAI Harop or ZALA Lancet are designed to loiter over a target area for an extended period. Loitering Munitions use onboard sensors (electro-optical/infrared) to locate targets of opportunity. They typically require a human-in-the-loop to select the target and approve the strike at the final stage.
- One-Way Attack Drones (OWA-UAV): Systems like the HESA Shahed 136 or the Fire Point FP-1 typically utilize GNSS (such as GPS or GLONASS) and inertial navigation to fly to specific, pre-programmed geographical coordinates. They generally do not possess the ability to loiter, hunt for moving targets or return to base if a target is not found.

According to the Royal United Services Institute (RUSI), OWA-UAVs are distinct because they are often employed for strategic "fires" against static infrastructure deep behind enemy lines, rather than tactical battlefield support.

== Characteristics ==
=== Cost and production ===
The defining characteristic of modern OWA-UAVs is their low cost relative to traditional cruise missiles. For example, a Kalibr cruise missile may cost upwards of $1 million, while a Shahed-136 OWA-UAV is estimated to cost between $20,000 and $50,000. This cost asymmetry allows operators to launch them in "swarms" or large salvos to deplete the defender's expensive surface-to-air missiles (SAMs). Those air defense missiles such as MIM-104 Patriot or NASAMS cost significantly more than the drones they are destroying. As a result a combination of low-cost interceptor drones, electronic jamming, anti-aircraft cannons as well as low-cost missiles such as APKWS are used against drone targets.

=== Design ===
Orthographic projection of a Shahed 131

Most OWA-UAVs utilize Commercial Off-The-Shelf (COTS) components to reduce manufacturing complexity and cost:

- Propulsion: Most of the one-way attack drones are typically powered by simple two-stroke or four-stroke piston engine (often copied from civilian aircraft or lawnmower engines) driving a pusher propeller. This gives them a distinctively loud acoustic signature, often compared to a "moped" or "lawnmower." Jet-powered one-way attack drones such as Shahed-238 are also available. Jet drones have greater weight-to-thrust ratio, higher payload and can achieve greater speeds allowing them to evade defences. But jet engines and fuel are costlier, and drone airframes must be made more robust to withstand the greater forces, and more advanced electronics are needed to control their flight. Thus, due to the cost they remain rare. Jet drones often have a smaller radar cross section due to the lack of a propeller but have a higher heat signature.
- Airframe: Delta-wing configurations are common (such as Shahed-136) to balance drag and payload capacity. They often use honeycomb structures and fiberglass to reduce weight and radar cross-section.
- Guidance: Guidance is primarily achieved through consumer-grade or military-grade GNSS modules. GNSS guidance is aided by inertial measurement units (IMUs) for environments where GPS jamming is present. Unlike loitering munitions, they rarely carry cameras or seekers. This lowers their cost but limits them to striking stationary targets.

== Operational history ==
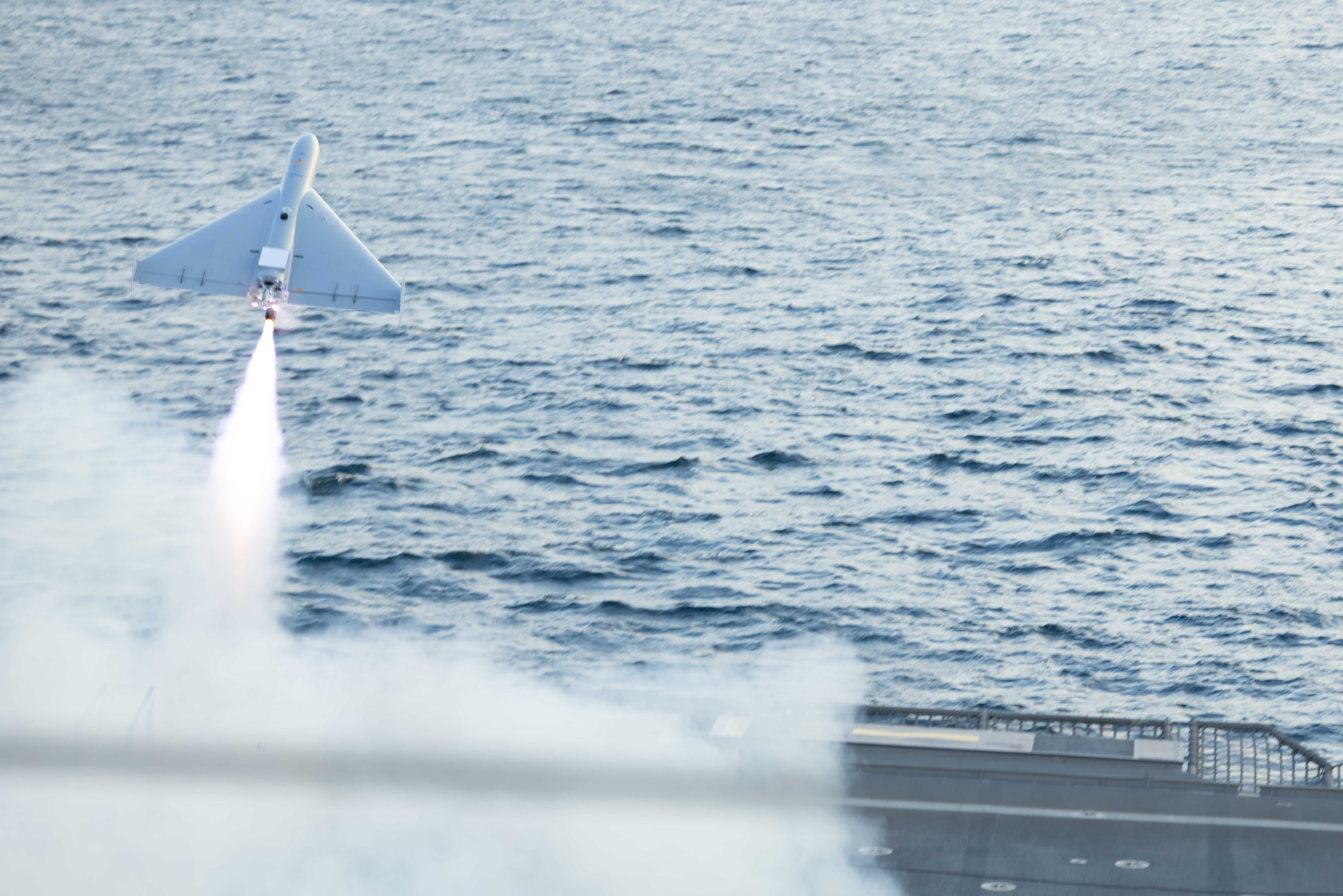
LUCAS, an American reverse-engineered version of the Iranian HESA Shahed 136 one-way attack drone, launching from the USS Santa Barbara

=== Russo-Ukrainian war ===
The Russo-Ukrainian war saw the first large-scale strategic use of OWA-UAVs. Beginning in late 2022, Russia began launching Iranian-supplied Shahed-131 and Shahed-136 one-way attack drones against Ukrainian energy infrastructure and cities. In response, Ukraine developed its own long-range OWA-UAV program to produce systems such as the "Beaver" (Bober) and the AQ-400. Those OWA-UAVs targets deep inside Russia, including oil refineries and airfields.

=== Middle East ===
- Yemen: The Houthi movement has extensively utilized OWA-UAVs (such as the Samad and Qasef families) to strike targets in Saudi Arabia and the UAE. They also used OWA-UAVs to target commercial shipping in the Red Sea.
- United States: In late 2024 and 2025, the United States Navy and CENTCOM began deploying their own OWA-UAV squadrons (Task Force Scorpion Strike) to the Middle East to strengthen deterrence, with the system developed by United States named "LUCAS" (Low-cost Unmanned Combat Attack System). On February 28, 2026, LUCAS was used to strike Iranian targets during the 2026 Iran war.

== List of OWA-UAVs ==
List of one-ways attack drones by manufacturing countries:

- Iran
  - Hadid 110
  - HESA Shahed-101
  - HESA Shahed 131
  - HESA Shahed 136
  - Raad 85
  - Arash-2
  - Meraj-532
  - Shahed 238
  - Zhobin (non-camera version)
  - Shahed 161
  - Shahed 141
  - Shahid Dana'ie
- Poland
  - PLargonia
  - WB Group Warmate 50
- Russia
  - Geran-1 (Shahed 131)
  - Geran-2 (Shahed 136)
  - Geran-3 (Shahed 238)
  - Geran-4
  - Geran-5
  - BM-35
  - BM-70
  - Gerbera
  - Klyn
  - Dan-M
  - Tyuvik
  - Dvushka
- Belarus
  - Nomad (Shahed/Geran copy)
- Saudi Arabia
  - SKYWASP (alongside the United States)
- Turkey
  - STM Kuzgun
- Ukraine
  - AQ-400 Scythe
  - Fire Point FP-1
  - Fire Point FP-2
  - An-196 Liutyi
  - UJ-26 Beaver
  - Morok
  - UJ-22 Airborne
  - UJ-25 Skyline
  - Palianytsia
  - Mugin-5
  - Lord
  - Banshee (conversion)
  - R-15
  - UJ-08 Skyline 300
  - Nayan
  - Sichen
  - Behemoth
  - Zozulia
  - A-22 Foxbat (conversion)
  - Sky ranger Nynja (conversion)
  - E-300 Enterprise
  - D-80 Discovery (alleged)
  - Bravo
  - DART series
  - Nyan (reported)
- United States
  - AeroVironment Red Dragon
  - Low-cost Uncrewed Combat Attack System (LUCAS, unlicensed Shahed 136)
  - SKYWASP (alongside Saudi Arabia)
  - MQM-172 Arrowhead (one-way attack variant)
- France
  - MBDA DELUGE (OWE)
- Pakistan
  - Mudamir-LR
  - GIDS Sarkash
  - HiMark-25 TJ
- United Kingdom
  - Banshee Jet 80+ (modified version)
  - HAMMER
  - SkyLance
  - NYAN One-Way-Effector
- Yemen
  - Eiban
  - Naqm
  - Houthis - Samad
- Sudan
  - Safaroog
- Kosovo
  - Skifteri K1
- Czech Republic
  - Nightray
- India
  - Sheshnaag-150
  - KAL (drone)

== See also ==
- Loitering munition
- Unmanned aerial vehicle
- Cruise missile
- Shahed 136
- Shahed 238
- CIM-10 Bomarc
- SSM-N-8 Regulus
- Henschel Hs 117
