= MARSS Interceptor =

Unmanned aircraft

- Type: C-UAS drone
- Place of origin: Monaco/UK

Production history
- Designed: 2021-2024
- Unit cost: MR: $30,000-$40,000

Specifications
- Mass: MR: 8 kg (18 lb); SR: 1.5 kg (3.3 lb)
- Length: MR: 80 cm (31 in); SR: 25 cm (9.8 in)
- Wingspan: MR: 90 cm (35 in); SR: 40 cm (16 in)
- Engine: Electric pusher propellers
- Operational range: MR: 5 km (3.1 mi); SR: 1 km (0.62 mi)
- Flight altitude: MR: 2 km (6,600 ft); SR: 500 m (1,600 ft)
- Maximum speed: MR: 80 m/s (288.0 km/h; 179.0 mph); SR: 60 m/s (216.0 km/h; 134.2 mph)
- Guidance system: Imaging infrared
- Launch platform: Box launcher

The MARSS Interceptor is an unmanned aerial vehicle (UAV) designed by MARSS Group for counter-unmanned aerial systems (C-UAS) use.

It is produced in Bristol, United Kingdom and Riyadh, Saudi Arabia for deliveries to European and Middle Eastern customers, respectively.

== Interceptor-MR ==
The Interceptor Medium Range was first displayed in March 2022. It is designed as a hard-kill countermeasure that rams hostile drones, using kinetic energy to destroy them rather than an explosive warhead, which might be unusable in towns and other sensitive areas. The air vehicle is electrically powered, and was initially propelled by four ducted fan rotors, two larger fans on the top and underneath providing thrust and two smaller fans at the wingtips for steering. This propulsion system enables it to achieve a top speed of 80 m/s (288 km/h; 155 knots). It originally had an overall weight of 10 kg (22 lb) and a wingspan of 90 cm. The fuselage is made of carbon fiber and polymer with titanium to reinforce the forward part as well as inserts in the wing leading edges and in the front part of the rotor nacelles. The Interceptor-MR can engage targets out to 5 km and at altitudes over 2 km, and maneuver up to 4 g.

Fitted with an imaging infrared sensor in the nose and combined with artificial intelligence algorithms from the company's NiDAR system that targets a drone's underside or front, it can autonomously engage with a 90% chance of scoring a successful hit, and it has the ability to re-engage if it misses. Compared to traditional short-range air defense missiles that can cost between $150,000-$200,000, the Interceptor-MR costs about one-fifth as much and is reusable. It can hit three Class 1 UAVs in a single flight, or one Class 2 drone, and if it still flies after impact it can return to the launch site for repairs. The modular design allows for the front, back, and wings to be rapidly replaced so the whole airframe can be put back into service.

By 2024 the design had been modified. To improve vertical takeoff performance, the ducted fans were replaced with two-blade open propellers and all four motors are the same size. To ensure they survive hitting a target drone, the motors are stopped immediately before impact and the blades fold up, then after the hit the motors automatically restart and the blades extend back out. The interceptor has air intakes in order to cool the uncooled IR sensor. The new configuration reduces weight to 8 kg, allowing for a 1 kg (2.2 lb) payload to be carried, such as a miniaturized electronic warfare package. In addition to being able to land vertically, the updated version adds a parachute at the rear of the airframe.

Experiences from the Russian invasion of Ukraine led MARSS to experiment with 3D printing the interceptor body. Compared to the carbon fiber version, a 3D printed fuselage is nearly the same weight but is less survivable, not ensuring multi-mission capability against even Class 1 UAS, but the production rate can be increased dramatically.

The Interceptor-MR is launched vertically from a box-type launcher that can be carried by a light vehicle or installed on building roofs, which then transition to horizontal flight. The launch canister is 140 cm × 110 cm (55 in × 43 in) and cold launches the aircraft using an electromagnetic catapult. MARSS offers customizable launchers, including a trailer that has four AESA radar antennas and an optronic gimbal, six canisters, and six reload interceptors.

== Interceptor-SR ==
Following the debut of the original version, MARSS unveiled the Interceptor Short Range in September 2023. It was developed in direct response to customer demand for a portable C-UAS solution organic to infantry units. The Interceptor-SR shares design features of its predecessor, but is smaller and lighter weighing 1.5 kg with a 30–40 cm (12–16 in) wingspan, which the company is working to reduce to 18 cm (7.1 in) through foldable open propellers. Both designs can be directed to abort an engagement and return to its launch site to be reused. It is able to defeat Class 1 UAVs out to 1 km, and is launched using a man-portable or vehicle-mounted compact launcher. As a last-ditch defense for armored vehicles, operation is fully automated and it has a reaction time of less than three seconds. Its smaller size restricts it to a single use if it strikes a target.

== Interceptor-LR ==
A larger version of the Interceptor is being developed for neutralising Class 3 drones. Instead of using kinetic ramming, it is planned to be equipped with a miniature EW solution such as a high power microwave system to fly close to a target and neutralize it with RF energy; this version is named the Interceptor-LR.

== See also ==
- Anvil
- Raytheon Coyote
