= Kometa =

Soviet/Russian military-industrial complex organization

Corporation for Special Purpose Space Systems "Kometa"
- Formerly: TsNII "Kometa", TsNPO "Kometa"
- Type: Joint stock company
- Industry: Aerospace engineering
- Founded: 1973
- Founders: Council of Ministers of the USSR
- Headquarters: ul. Velozavodskaya, d. 5, Moscow, Russia
- Key people: Novikov, Yan Valentinovich (Chairman of the board of directors); Misnik, Viktor Porfiryevich (General director - General designer)
- Operating income: $215M (2019)
- Net income: $6M (2019)
- Number of employees: more than 2 thousand people
- Parent: Federal Agency for State Property Management
- Subsidiaries: OJSC Scientific Research Institute of Optoelectronic Instrumentation
- Website: corpkometa.ru

Kometa (full name: Corporation for Special Purpose Space Systems "Kometa") is an enterprise of the Russian military-industrial complex specializing in the research, development, production and operation of space information management and intelligence systems.

== History ==
On September 8, 1947, the Decree No. 3140-1026 of the Council of Ministers of the Soviet Union formed the "Special Bureau No. 1" (SB-1) of the Ministry of Armaments. P. N. Kuksenko was appointed director of the SB-1. One of the bureau's first developments was an air-to-sea guided missile system under the code "Kometa". In August 1950, SB-1 was transformed into "Design Bureau No. 1" (KB-1). In 1955, the 41st department of KB-1, which dealt with aviation missile weapons, was reorganized into the "Special Design Bureau No. 41" (SKB-41, Специальное конструкторское бюро No. 41). Since 1958 it has been headed by Anatoly Savin.

On December 30, 1961, SKB-41 was transformed into the "Special Design Bureau No. 41" (OKB-41, Особое конструкторское бюро No. 41), and space topics became its main focus. The first task was to develop means for controlling, processing and transmitting information under the Istrebitel Sputnikov program. In 1963, the Flight-1 (Полёт-1) maneuvering satellite was launched, a prototype of space interceptors.

On April 26, 1973, by Order No. 245 of the Minister of Radio Technology of the USSR, pursuant to Decree No. 183-63 of March 26, 1973, the "Kometa Central Research Institute" (TsNII "Kometa") was created on the basis of OKB-41, SKB-39 and the Mospribor Machine-Building Plant. Anatoly Savin was appointed director of the Kometa Central Research Institute. The Institute became the leading organization in the field of anti-satellite weapons and the space echelon of early-warning radars. TsNII "Kometa" worked closely with OKB Chelomei, which created rockets, and NPO Lavochkin, which was in charge of the payload.

Since 1979, the enterprise has been called "NPO Kometa"; Since 1985, "TsNPO Kometa"; Since 1999, the Federal State Unitary Enterprise (FSUE) "Kometa Central Research Institute". In 2004, it was transferred to the jurisdiction of Roscosmos. In 2006, the enterprise was given the status of a federal research and production center.

In 2012, on the basis of the Federal State Unitary Enterprise "Kometa Central Research Institute", the open joint stock company "Kometa Corporation of Special Purpose Space Systems" was created (OJSC "Kometa Corporation", since 2014 - JSC).

== Structure ==
Kometa Corporation includes seven design bureaus, departments of automation and documentation, scientific and technological, metrology and standardization; departments of calculation and design, reliability and durability; production.

The structure of the enterprise includes subsidiaries like "Submikron Research Institute" (Zelenograd) and "OEP Research Institute" (Sosnovy Bor), as well as branches: "Kvazar Design Bureau of Measuring Instruments" (Nizhny Novgorod); "Scientific and Design Center for Optoelectronic Observation Complexes" ("SPC OECS", Saint Petersburg); "Scientific and Technical Implementation Center" ("NTTVC", Zhukov); "Vostochny" (Komsomolsk-on-Amur); "Experimental production and technical center" ("OPTC", Vyshny Volochyok).

== Products ==
Kometa Corporation, with its branches, carries out work on research and development of equipment for systems for monitoring space and ground objects from space (complexes of anti-space defense, monitoring of marine objects, detection of launches of ground-based ballistic missiles, etc.). The equipment created by the corporation is used to detect emergencies, for military purposes, etc. At various times, the enterprise produced missiles, space complexes, and equipment for aircraft control.

The enterprise participated in the creation of systems such as:

- Oko-1 (US-KMO) - a satellite system for ICBM launches detection;
- KRT-10 - an orbital radio telescope with a 10-meter parabolic antenna deployed in space;
- Dragon - a system of missile anti-tank weapons;
- KS-1 Komet and K-10S - air-to-sea anti-ship missiles;
- Strela - anti-ship missiles of the "land-sea" class;
- K-20 and K-22 - air-to-surface anti-ship missiles;
- Meteor - anti-ship missiles of the "ground-to-ground" class;
- P-15 Termit - anti-ship missiles of the "sea-sea" class;
- Legenda - spacecraft with a nuclear installation on board.

In addition to military equipment, the company produces various medical equipment and highly artistic castings (for example, the bronze sign "Kilometre zero" in Moscow, 1996).

== Awards ==
- Order of the Red Banner of Labour - for merits in the creation of special and civilian equipment.

== Bibliography ==
- Центральный научно-исследовательский институт "Комета". 30 лет. «Арсеналы России» (in Russian). М.: Издательский дом «Оружие и технологии». 2002. p. 192. ISBN 5-93799-009-9.
- Виктор Марковский, Игорь Приходченко (2015). Ракетоносец Ту-16. Триумф советского авиапрома (in Russian). I︠A︡uza. ISBN 978-5-699-83723-6.
