= Low-cost Uncrewed Combat Attack System =

American-built one-way attack drone

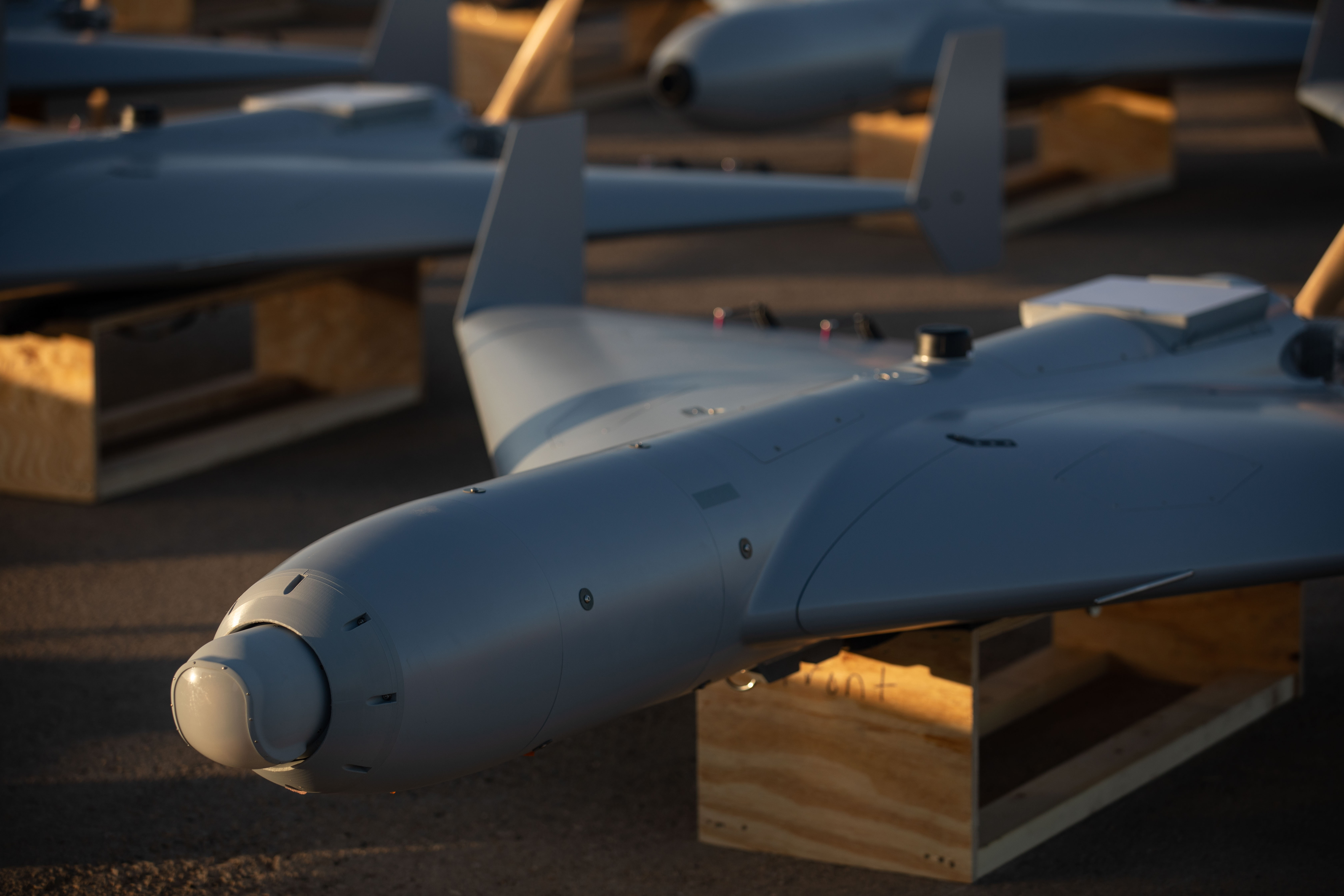
- Several LUCAS drones in November 2025
- Type: One-way attack drone
- Place of origin: United States

Service history
- In service: 2025–present
- Used by: United States Armed Forces
- Wars: Operation Absolute Resolve; Operation Epic Fury

Production history
- Designer: SpektreWorks
- Developed from: HESA Shahed 136
- Unit cost: $35,000

Specifications
- Length: 10 ft (3.0 m)
- Wingspan: 8 ft (2.4 m)
- Engine: 215 cc carbureted internal-combustion engine
- Operational range: 500 mi (800 km)

The Low-cost Uncrewed Combat Attack System (Note: Sometimes referred to as the Low-cost Unmanned Combat Attack System, sometimes by manufacturer designation FLM-136) (LUCAS) is a one-way attack drone, also referred to as a kamikaze drone or suicide drone, developed for the United States Armed Forces by U.S. defense contractor SpektreWorks. Its core design is based on reverse engineering of the Iranian-designed HESA Shahed 136. LUCAS is similar in appearance to the Shahed 136, albeit slightly smaller at about ten feet (3.0 m) long and with a wingspan of about eight feet (2.4 m). LUCAS is designed to be mass-producible at scale for low cost compared to more expensive conventional munitions; U.S. CENTCOM claimed the cost of the drone to be $35,000 per unit.

LUCAS was first revealed in July 2025, and the first operational squadron was deployed in the Middle East in December 2025. According to OSINT researchers, LUCAS was first used on January 3, 2026 as part of Operation Absolute Resolve. LUCAS's first officially confirmed use was in February 2026, against the Islamic Republic of Iran Armed Forces during the 2026 Iran War.

== Background and development ==
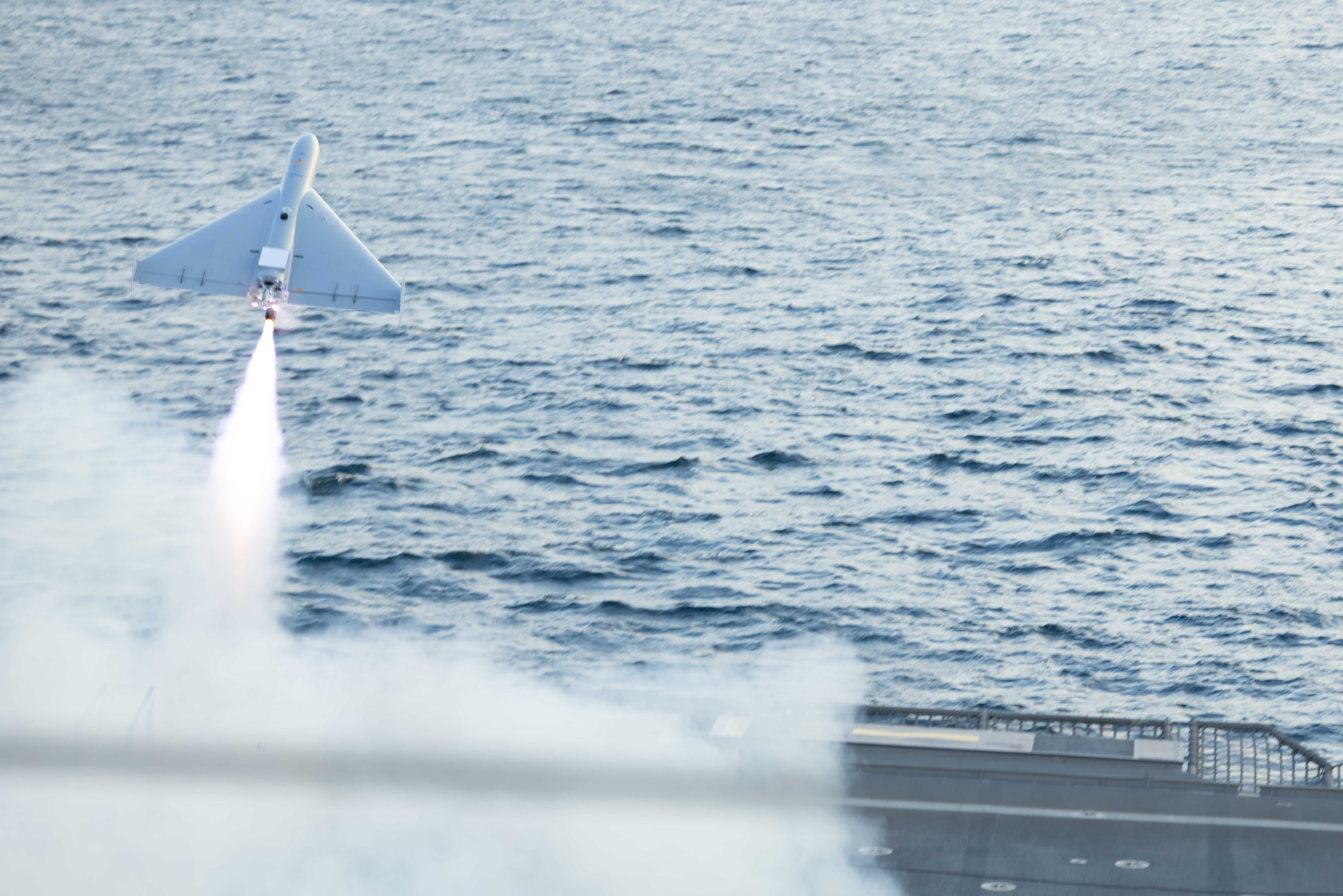
A LUCAS launching from USS Santa Barbara (LCS-32)

One-way attack drones are a type of expendable drone, typically carrying a warhead and meant to detonate upon impact. The first examples were produced in the 1970s and 1980s, but in the 2000s and 2010s production dramatically increased, especially with the introduction of Iranian models. Shahed drones were used in various conflicts, including extensive use by Russia during the ongoing Russo-Ukrainian War, who mass-produced a version known as the Geran-2. Lessons learned from these conflicts led the U.S. to step up development of autonomous weapon systems; efforts included the 2023 Replicator program to build "thousands of autonomous weapons" by July 2025. This was followed by a July 2025 "drone dominance" initiative, further supporting drone production and aiming to equip military units with one-way attack drones by the end of 2026.

The US captured a Shahed 136 "a few years" before 2025, and set to reverse engineer it. The primary contractor, SpektreWorks, an Arizona-based firm specializing in unmanned systems, led the engineering effort. Founded in 2018, SpektreWorks had previously developed the FLM-136, a Shahed-inspired target drone for training and threat emulation. LUCAS evolved from this platform, with initial prototypes unveiled at a Pentagon briefing in July 2025. LUCAS was tested at Yuma Proving Ground.

LUCAS can navigate autonomously, and has a range of about 500 miles (800 km). According to defense analysts, LUCAS may use SpaceX Starshield, a military version of Starlink, for this purpose. The unit cost is roughly $35,000, which has been contrasted with the $2.5 million cost of a Tomahawk Land Attack Missile.

== Deployment and operational use ==
LUCAS was first deployed in late 2025. CENTCOM announced a deployment to the Middle East on December 3, 2025, under Task Force Scorpion Strike, part of Special Operations Command Central.

On December 16, 2025, USS Santa Barbara (LCS-32) test launched a LUCAS drone at sea for the first time, in the Persian Gulf.

According to OSINT researchers, LUCAS was first used on January 3, 2026 during Operation Absolute Resolve as part of strikes against the Venezuelan armed forces. The drones were used in conjunction with missile strikes to swarm and overwhelm Venezuelan air defense systems in the successful operation to capture President Nicolás Maduro.

The first officially confirmed usage of LUCAS was on February 28, 2026, when the system was used to strike Iranian targets during the 2026 Iran war. On March 5, the CENTCOM commander, Admiral Brad Cooper noted the weapon was 'indispensable', but declined to define its current targets in Iran. Iran claimed to have shot down a LUCAS in mid-July 2026 near the southern port city of Bandar Abbas by the Islamic Revolutionary Guard Corps's Air Defense systems.
