= Shahed 131 =

Iranian-made drone

- Orthographic projection of a Shahed-131/Geran-1
- Type: One-way attack drone
- Place of origin: Iran

Service history
- Used by: Iran; Russia (as Geran-1)

Production history
- Designer: Shahed Aviation Industries

Specifications
- Mass: 135 kg (298 lb)
- Length: 2.6 m (8.5 ft)
- Wingspan: 2.2 m (7.2 ft)
- Warhead weight: 15 kilograms (33 lb)
- Operational range: 900 km (559 mi)
- Guidance system: GNSS, INS

The Shahed 131 (Persian: شاهد ۱۳۱, lit. 'Witness 131'), or Geran-1 (Russian: Герань-1, lit. 'Geranium-1') in Russian service, is an Iranian-made one-way attack drone which came to prominence in October 2022 during the Russo-Ukrainian war, when it was used by Russia to attack critical Ukrainian infrastructure and civilian targets. It is powered by a Wankel engine model Shahed-783/788.

== Design ==
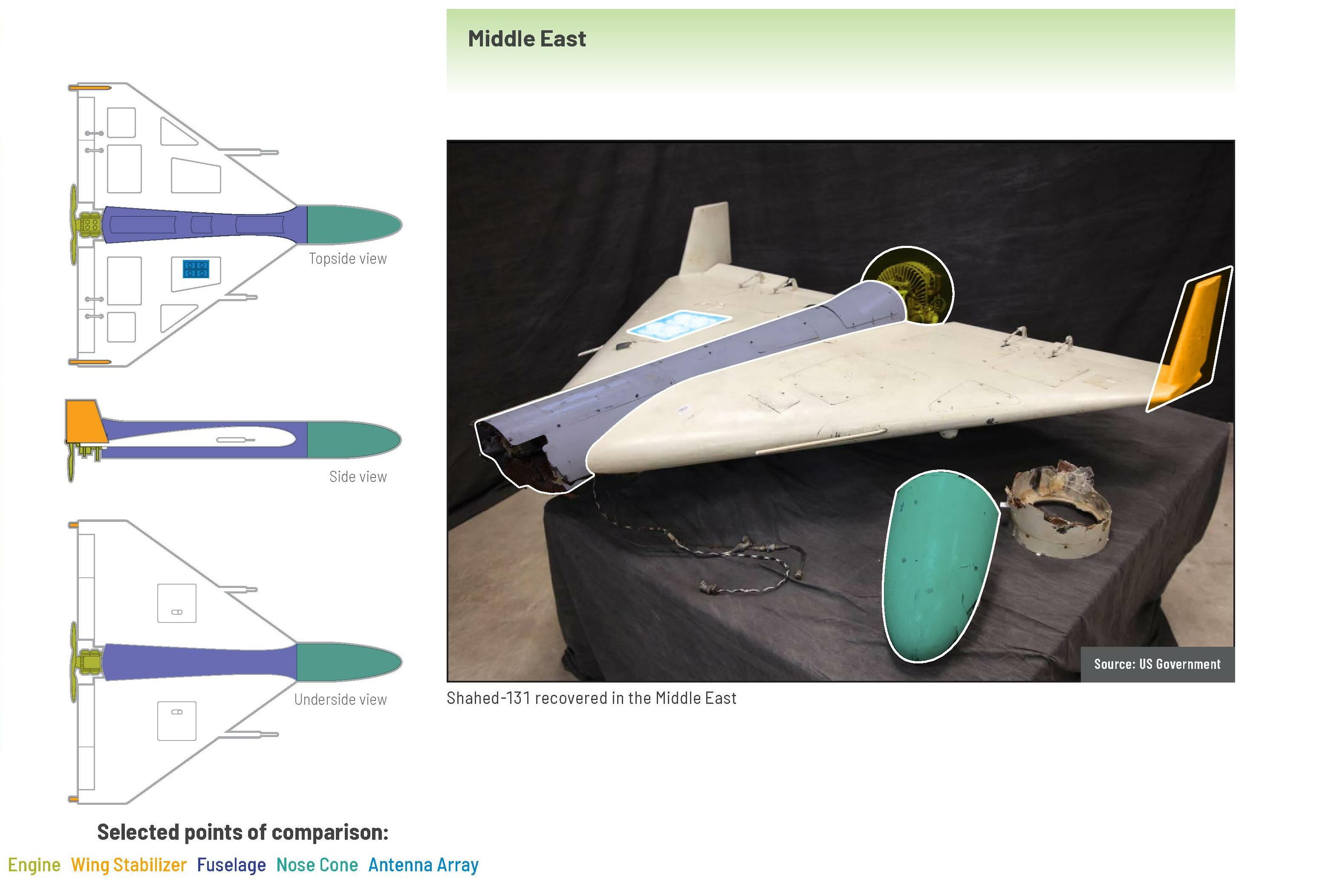
Photograph and sketch of a Shahed-131 recovered in the Middle East

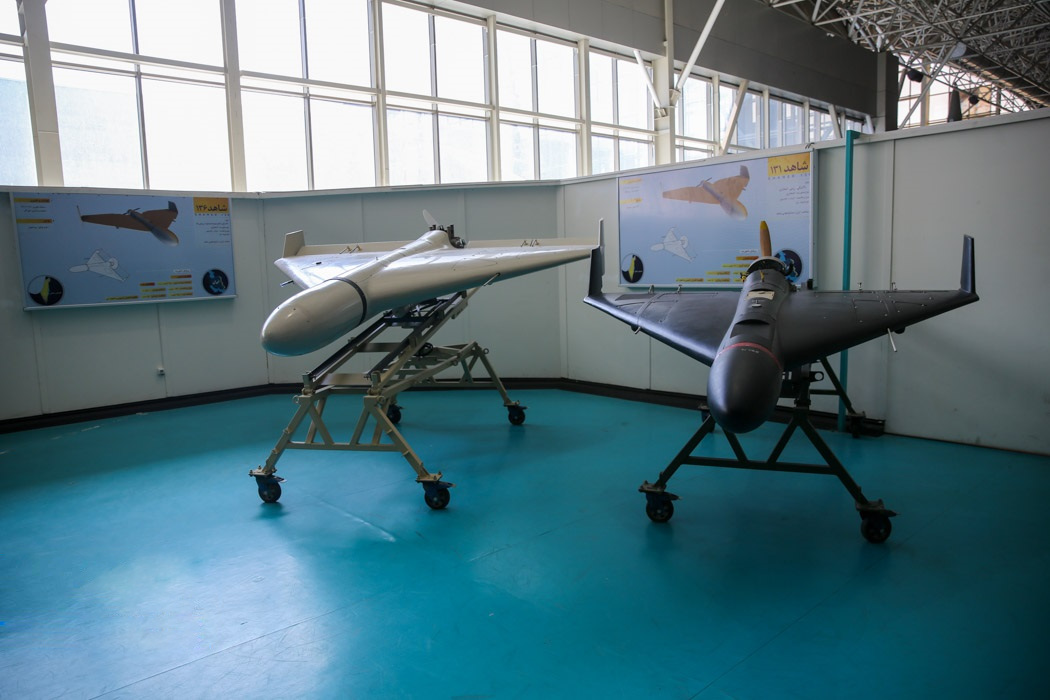
A black Shahed-131 exhibited in Iran next to the larger Shahed-136 in 2023

The Shahed-131 is powered by the Serat-1 Wankel engine, a 38-horsepower unit that is a copy of the Beijing Micropilot UAV Control System Ltd MDR-208 Wankel engine and is derived from the British AR 731 engine. An engine of this type was used for the drone in the 2019 Aramco attack in Abqaiq, which was referred to the UN Secretariat as part of the Resolution 2231 2020 investigations. The airframe is constructed from lightweight composite materials, including carbon fiber cloth or fiberglass with a honeycomb core, which contributes to its low radar cross-section.

The Shahed-131 flight control unit was found to be able to connect with Iridium satellites, which in theory allows the flight path to be altered mid flight. The flight controller has a backup inertial navigation system by MEMS gyroscope. Its primary instructions are derived from a commercial-grade GPS unit, which in later versions deployed by Russia has reportedly been modified with anti-deception algorithms to mitigate GPS signal alterations.

Designs for the Kentron ARD-10 loitering drone were sold to Iran Aviation Industries Organization in 2004/5 and used by Shahed Aviation Industries to develop the Shahed 131 and Shahed 136 drones, according to Air Forces Monthly magazine. However a Royal United Services Institute article states the origins of the Shahed 131 are obscure.

The Shahed 131 is visually distinguished by having vertical stabilisers that extend only upwards from the ends of the wings, while on the larger Shahed 136 they extend both up and down. It has a forward-mounted warhead compartment capable of accommodating 10 to 20 kg of explosives, enabling it to function as a kamikaze drone upon target impact. Warhead configurations observed include high-explosive charges with pre-formed fragmentation casings for area effects or shaped charge warheads for anti-armor capability.

== Operational history ==
It has been alleged the drone was first seen in the Arabian Peninsula when it was used to attack Saudi targets by the Houthi rebels. However The Washington Post reported that other types of drone were used in that attack.

=== Russo-Ukrainian war ===
It was used in the Russo-Ukrainian war, under a Russian name Geran-1. A simplified version is also called Geran-3 where the diesel engine has been replaced with a DLE-60 twin gasoline engine. The use of the Shahed-131/Geran-1 by Russia is part of a strategy to employ economical, expendable platforms for precision strikes, often launched in swarms to overwhelm air defenses.

In addition to supplying these drones to Russia, Iran has trained thousands of Russian personnel to operate the Shahed 131 drones. This includes hundreds of Russian pilots, communications specialists, technicians, and handlers. Iran has also established specialized mobile command-and-control communications stations to assist Russia with efficiently using the drones across the vast space of Ukraine. A "relatively large" number of engineers and technicians have also accompanied the drones to Russia to handle equipment issues. Prior to the war, Russia has had a history of underperforming drones in their military; the Russian indigenous drone fleet was "light and small", with low range and limited flight capacity. The initiation of the Ukraine war in February 2022 put them in dire need of various types of drones, including bombers, suicide (kamikaze) drones, and surveillance drones. Iran's provision of more advanced and versatile drones was therefore a great benefit to Russia in its military actions in Ukraine.

=== Iran war 2026 ===
Iran extensively used Shahed 131 along with Shahed 136 drones to carry out large scale attacks on U.S. bases along the Persian Gulf.

== Operators ==
- Iran: By IRGCASF/NEHSA and IRGCN/NEDSA
- Russia: Used as the Geran-1, with domestic production in the Alabuga Special Economic Zone (ASEZ) building upon Iranian designs.

=== Non-state actors ===
- Houthis
- Islamic Resistance in Iraq
- Saraya Ababil: Used as Murad-6

== Global impact ==
Iran's low-cost Shahed drones have created a global market for low-cost, high performing versatile drones that can be used in attritional combat scenarios. Shahed series drones appear to cost approximately US$20,000, whereas air-to-air missiles or ground-based interceptors cost between US$400,000 to US$1.2 million each. Through the expansion of drone supplying via provision of drones to Russia, Iran has also expanded its global market share, gaining credibility for its military technology, along with increased reputation on the global scene.

The sophistication and dissemenation of these drones in the global military marketplace, most notably seen in the Russo-Ukrainian war, are theorized by scholars to go beyond this specific conflict and cause Western powers to begin more advanced drone developments to keep up:

Just as with Western support for Ukraine, the Iranian drone build-up will have implications that go beyond this specific conflict. Iranian drones are increasing not only in number, but also sophistication and lethality, a development that concerns the United States and Europe. In response, we can expect Western actors to prioritise the production and export of low-cost defence systems able to counter the mass-produced drones directed by Iran, Iranian proxies, and other adversaries.

== See also ==
- HESA Shahed 136 – (Iran)
- IAI Harpy – (Israel)
- Dornier DAR – (West Germany)
