= 107th Separate Aviation Wing (Ukraine) =

Military unit of the Ukrainian Air Force

- 107-ме окреме авіаційне крило
- Active: 2024 – present
- Country: Ukraine
- Allegiance: Armed Forces of Ukraine
- Branch: Ukrainian Air Force
- Type: Air Force Aviation
- Role: Air defence
- Size: Wing
- Engagements: Russo-Ukrainian War
- Decorations: For Courage and Bravery

Insignia
- Roundel

- Fin flash

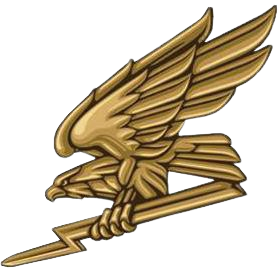
- Air force aviation insignia

Aircraft flown
- Fighter: F-16 Fighting Falcon

The 107th Separate Aviation Wing is a formation of the Ukrainian Air Force, operating the Western built F-16.

Due to Operational Security, it has not been disclosed where the Wing is based, how many F-16s it operates, or whether all the F-16s Ukraine received are in service with the unit as of February 2026.

The Ukrainian F-16 fleet, and tactical aviation operations in general, are highly decentralized. Aircraft may scramble from one location and land back at a different air base. This dispersion tactic is used to make it harder for Russian forces to target or intercept Ukrainian aircraft. For this purpose, Ukraine has introduced truck-based mobile complexes for mission planning, maintenance, and rearmament of F-16.

This strategy has most likely influenced Ukraine's decision to procure the Swedish-made Saab JAS 39 Gripen, which was designed for decentralized operations in Sweden's heavily forested terrain.

== History ==
=== Russo-Ukrainian War ===
The unit was created in 2024 as first of its kind. Historically Ukraine organized its air assets into Aviation Brigades. This can be seen as a step of Ukraine's effort to modernize and restructure its armed forces.

The unit draws from pilots of several Aviation Brigades, including the 299th Tactical Aviation Brigade. They were sent to Romania to be trained on the F-16, as part of the F-16 training coalition.

On 26 August 2024, the 68th Network Warfare Squadron of the United States Air Force reported that it had worked with Danish, Norwegian and Ukrainian specialists to install, program and adapt a number of electronic warfare systems for the delivery of aircraft to the Ukrainian Air Force.

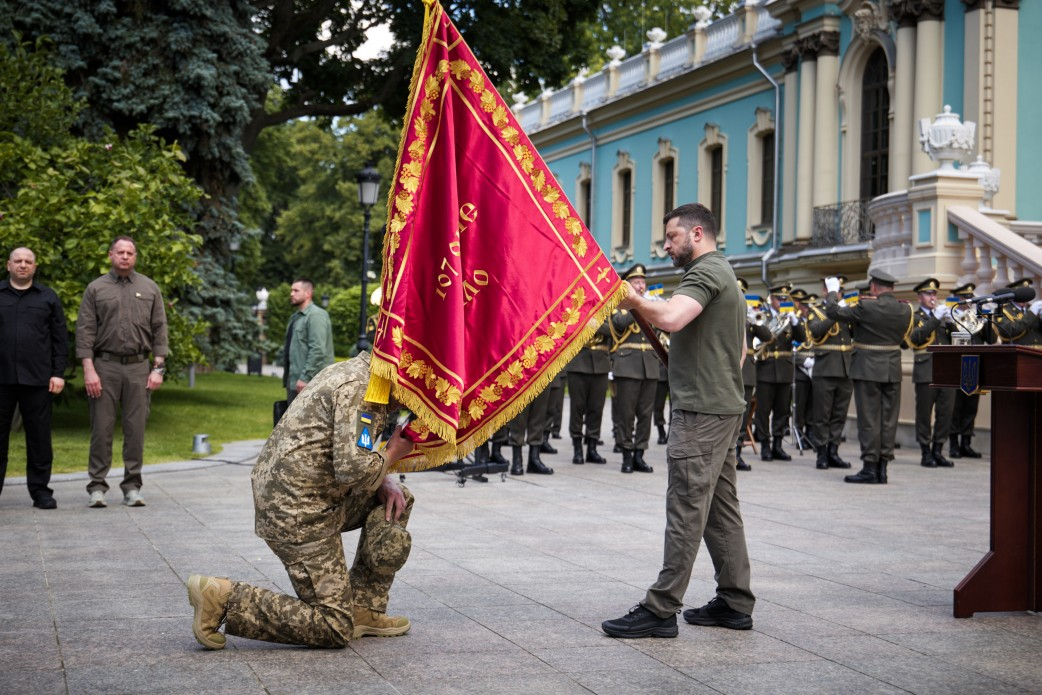
Volodymyr Zelenskyy presents battle flags to the deputy commander of the 107th Separate Aviation Wing

On 3 August 2025 a battle flag was presented to the deputy commander of the Aviation Wing by the President of Ukraine Volodymyr Zelenskyy.

In February 2026, Intelligence Online published an article which claimed that the wing contained private pilots with combat experience from the United States and the Netherlands, who were hired on six-month contracts. It was claimed that the pilots do not wear official insignia and are not officially included on personnel lists. The pilots were claimed to frequently partake in air defence missions around Kyiv, tasked with the interception of Kalibr and Kh-101 missiles, Geran drones, and others. These claims were dismissed by Ukrainian Air Force spokesperson Yurii Ihnat, ironically stating "Aha! And Tom Cruise leads the squadron". Ihnat stressed that there were no such pilots or units taking part in combat.

In late September 2026, the Wall Street Journal reported that more than half of the F-16s supplied to Ukraine may be unavailable for active combat duty due to delays in scheduled maintenance in Europe. The report came as Russia increased its use of high speed jet-powered drones such as the Geran-4 and Geran-5, which the F-16 is best suited to intercept. It was noted that the aircraft were nearing the end of their service life, with the airframes provided by European nations being among the oldest F-16s in service. The high tempo of operations result in even heavier maintenance demands.

Aircraft were unable to be overhauled in Ukraine, with repairs carried out by the Belgian firm Sabena Aerospace under a contract with Lockheed Martin worth $235.5 million USD. Each aircraft requires an in-depth inspection after 300 flight hours, with servicing taking as long as 40 weeks. The report claimed that Ukraine could run out of operational F-16s by the end of 2026. Earlier in 2025, it was reported that six former Norwegian F-16s were grounded for an extended period of time in Belgium. In response, Sabena Aerospace denied what it called "erroneous information alleging significant delays in this critical maintenance program".

F-16AM in Ukrainian Air Force service, 2025

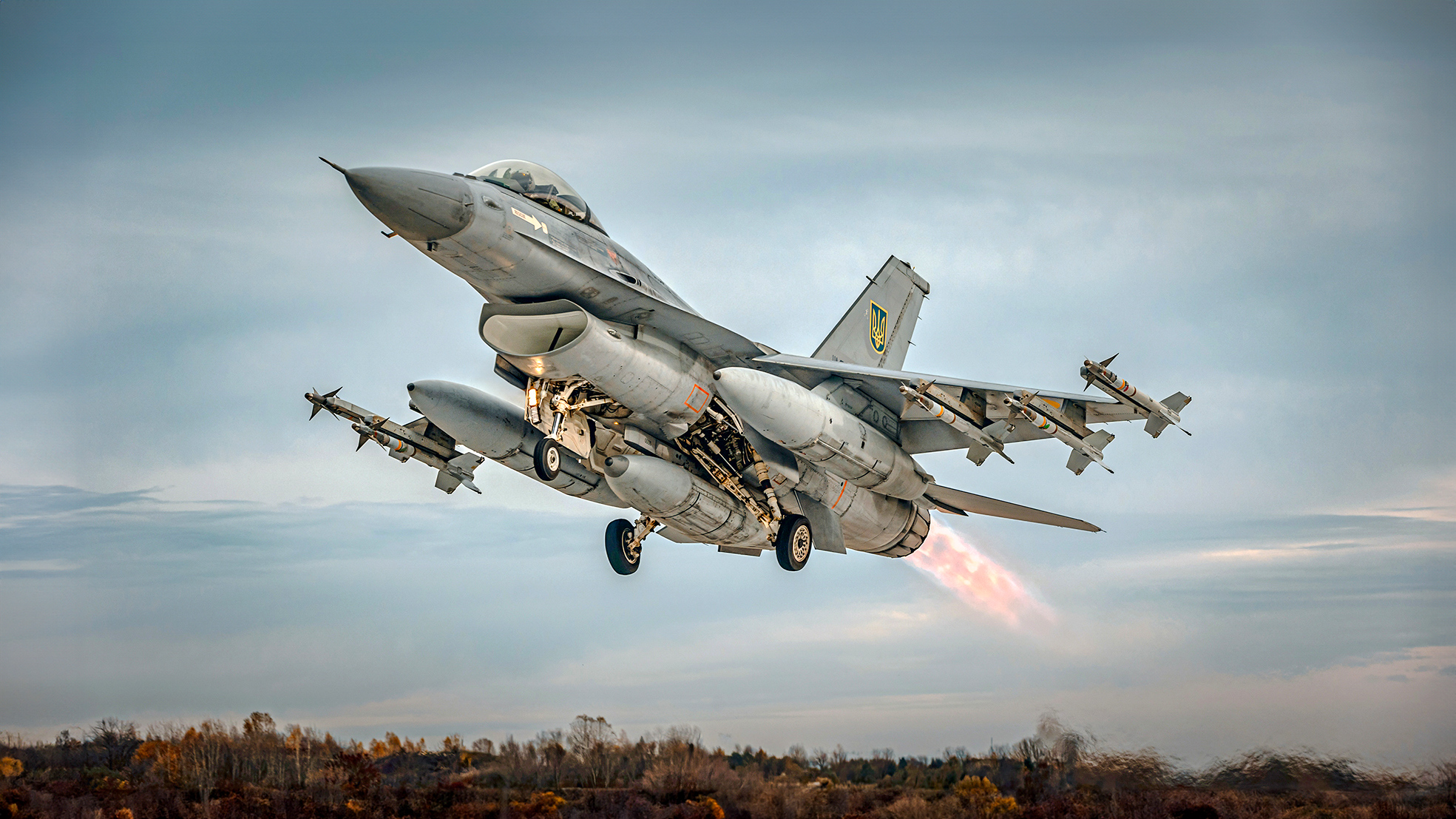

Further coverage reported a shortage of AMRAAM and Sidewinder missiles, with pilots having to ration the use of missiles and more dangerously rely on the aircraft's M61 Vulcan rotary cannon. AMRAAMs are also used by Ukraine's NASAMS air defence system, and stocks have been eroded by Ukraine's own use, as well as combat in the Middle East as a result of the 2026 Iran War. The Wall Street Journal suggested moving further maintenance to Ukraine, as well as leveraging NATO infrastructure in Romania. The Ukrainian Minister of Foreign Affairs denied claims of low readiness and excessively low repairs, although it acknowledged that parts availability and maintenance was increasingly difficult. President Volodymyr Zelenskyy assured that further F-16 aircraft would be supplied from Belgium by the end of 2026, and that the country would further attempt to acquire ammunition worldwide.

On 28 September 2026, Ukrainian President Volodymyr Zelenskyy awarded the 107th Separate Aviation Wing with the honorary award "For Courage and Bravery".

F-16 downs a Geran-2 drone using its M61 Vulcan cannon, 2026

In October 2026, The New York Times reported that the F-16 was increasingly the primary method of intercepting an increasing number of Russian high speed jet-powered drones, due to a shortage of interceptor missiles for its ground based air defence. Retired U.S. Air Force officer and head of the Mitchell Institute for Aerospace Studies, David A. Deptula stated that the country was "forced to use a relatively small fighter fleet day after day as a substitute for an adequately sourced, layered air defense system." The Head of the Communications Department of the Ukrainian Air Force Yurii Ihnat stated that F-16s had shot down a significant number of the 1,900 jet drones claimed intercepted by the air force, with one pilot claiming the downing of 10 jet-powered drones in a single flight. Additionally, in September 2026, claims were made by the Commander of the Ukrainian Air Force Anatolii Kryvonozhko of the downing of 666 cruise missiles and 2,500 various drones. While it was reported that F-16s had carried out more than 650 air-to-ground strikes, they had largely been used for air defence.

At the International Fighter Conference in Munich on 5 November 2026, the commander of Ukraine's F-16 fighter wing, call sign "Phantom", noted that the F-16s have shot down 4,700 drones and cruise missiles since entering service, 1,100 of which were downed in October. Because the fighters are used mostly in the counter-UAV role, F-16s were responsible for 85% of all drone interceptions. Most targets were destroyed using the fighter's onboard cannon, as according to the commander "We try to ration the munitions. If we have the gun we'll use the gun, if we have APKWS we will use APKWS, and as a last resort, we'll use AIM-9 or AIM-120". The F-16s have also conducted airstrikes using precision-guided munitions alongside older jets.

At the same conference, the commander further revealed that a Ukrainian F-16 pilot shot down 8 Russian drones in a single sortie using his fighter's cannon, returning to base with 100 rounds out of his original 500 rounds, and was made Hero of Ukraine after the mission. The same pilot, who is with the 107th Separate Aviation Wing, then broke the record a few days later when he shot down nine drones again and returned with some 80 rounds remaining.

==== Losses ====
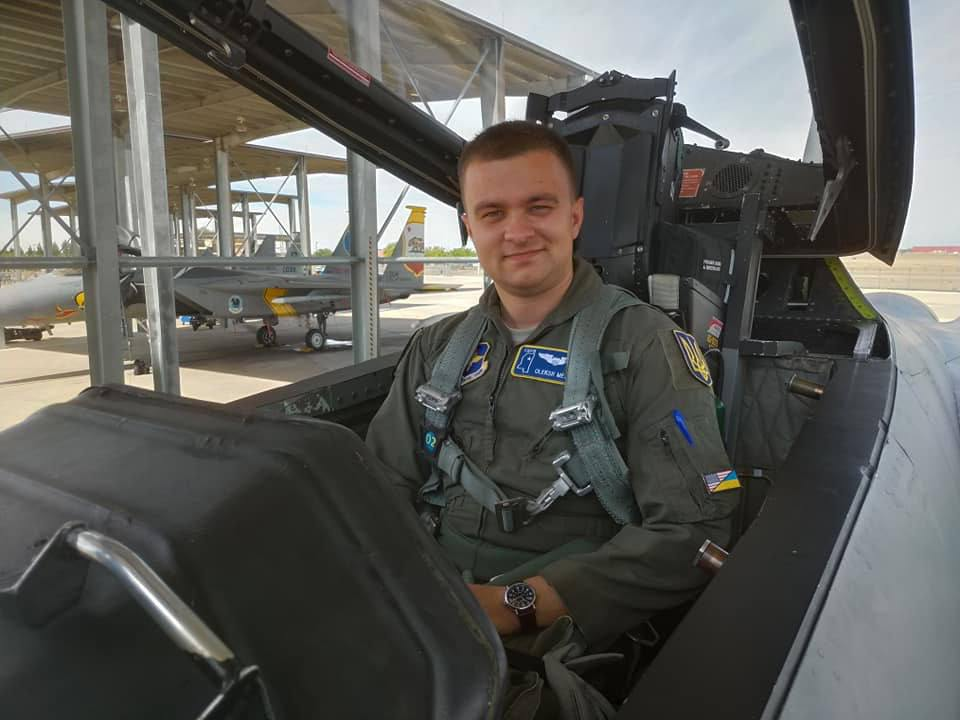
Oleksii Mes

On 26 August 2024, an F-16 piloted by Oleksii Mes "Moonfish" crashed under unknown circumstances in Rivne Oblast. Ukrainian affiliated sources initially reported that Mes had been killed in a combat mission, but the loss of the aircraft was not confirmed. However, Mes could easily be identified as one of the first Ukrainian F-16 pilots due to his frequent press appearances. Several days later the Wall Street Journal reported that a Ukrainian F-16 had been destroyed. Following this, the loss was officially acknowledged by the Ukrainian Air Force and the General Staff of the Armed Forces of Ukraine. The cause of the crash remains unclear, with a friendly fire incident, pilot error or damage sustained in combat being regarded as possible scenarios. Mes was posthumously awarded the title of Hero of Ukraine.

As a result of the loss, Volodymyr Zelenskyy dismissed the Commander of the Ukrainian Air Force Mykola Oleshchuk on 30 August 2024 with Anatolii Kryvonozhko appointed as acting commander. People's Deputy and former member of Servant of the People Maryana Bezuhla claimed that the loss of the aircraft had been a result of friendly fire, further accusing the Armed Forces of Ukraine of perpetuating a culture of unprofessionalism and corruption. On 18 September, the Verkhovna Rada unanimously voted to remove her from her position as deputy chair of the Parliamentary Committee on National Security and Defense.

On 12 April 2025, an F-16 piloted by Pavlo Ivanov "Scratch" was shot down by a Russian S-400 missile system while performing a JDAM strike mission during the 2025 Sumy offensive. Ivanov was posthumously awarded the tile of Hero of Ukraine.

On 16 May 2025, an F-16 was lost while attempting to counter a Russian Geran-2 drone attack. The pilot was able to eject successfully and was rescued by a CSAR team.

On 29 June 2025, an F-16 piloted by Maksym Ustymenko "Smoke" was lost in Kyiv Oblast while attempting to counter a Russian Geran-2 drone attack. Ustymenko was posthumously awarded the title of Hero of Ukraine.

On 29 July 2026, an F-16 was lost while attempting to counter a Russian drone attack. The aircraft was downed in Poltava Oblast, while the pilot was able to eject successfully.

== Aircraft ==
The unit operates an unknown number of F-16 Fighting Falcons, which Ukraine has received from the Netherlands, Denmark and Norway since 2024.

== Aircraft on display ==
F-16 on display at the National Defence University of Ukraine

A twin-seat F-16B (incorrectly labelled as an F-16D) acquired from the United States is on display at the War Museum of the National Defence University of Ukraine in Kyiv. The decommissioned aircraft was directly delivered from the 309th Aerospace Maintenance and Regeneration Group in Tucson, Arizona and did not see service in the Ukrainian Air Force. The aircraft was installed for demonstrative and educational purposes, as well as a "symbol of international support". The aircraft is liveried with a Ukrainian roundel and fin-flash, alongside several AIM-9 Sidewinder missiles.

== Gallery ==
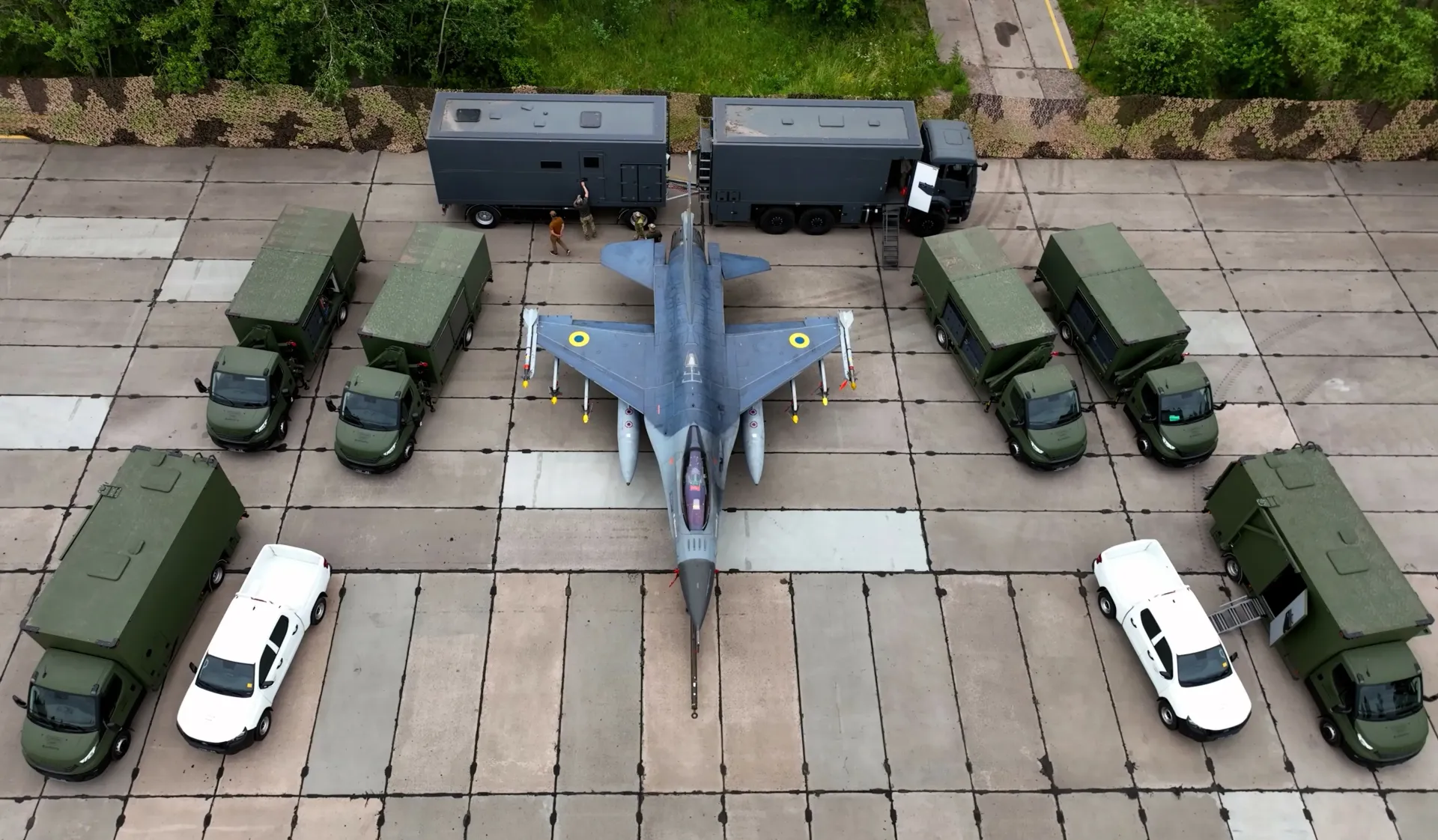
Ukrainian F-16 with trucks of its mobile complex

Trucks used for Ukrainian F-16 dispersed operations

F-16s flying over Ukraine in 2026

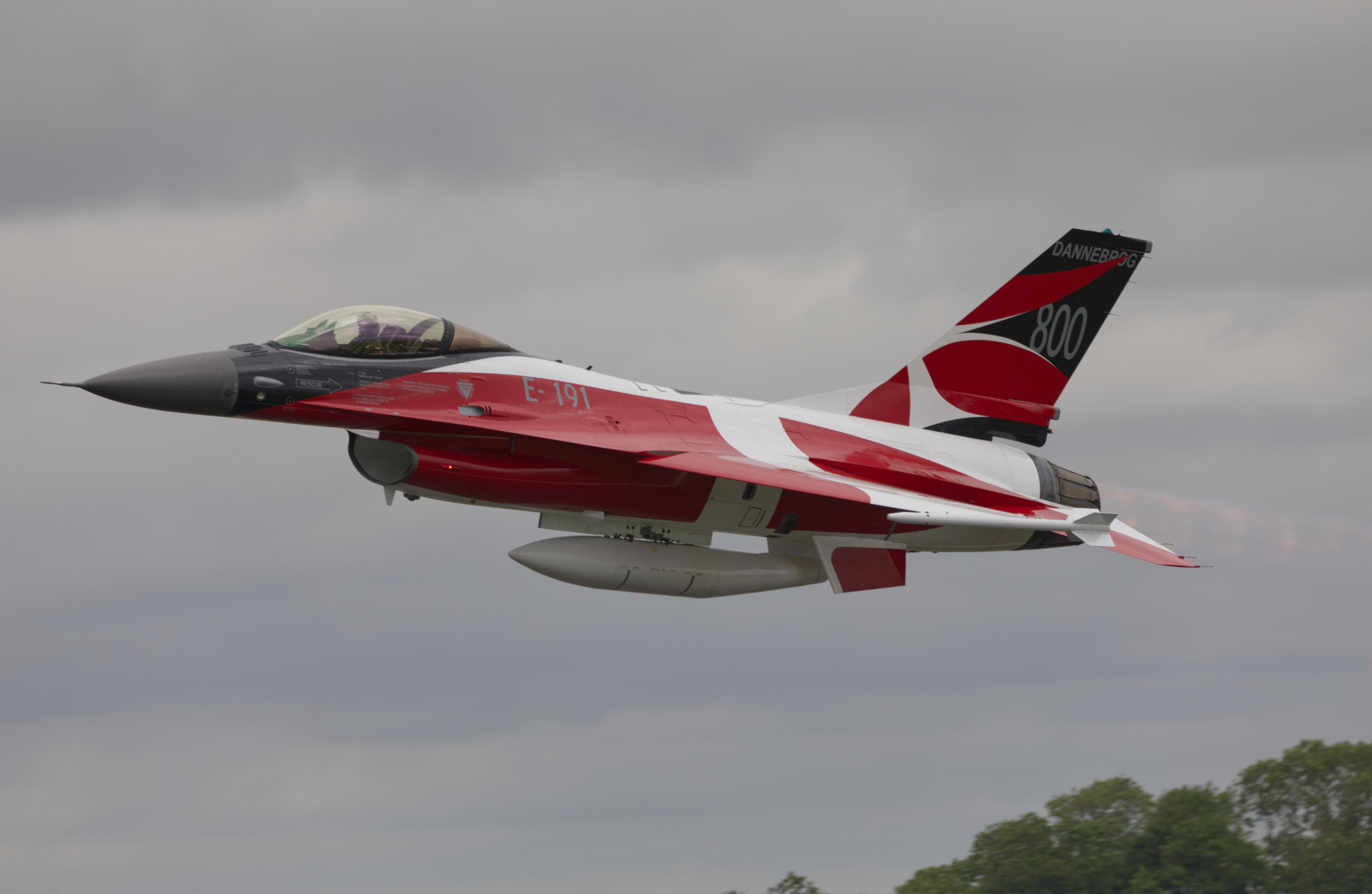
Ex-RDAF F-16 E-191 now in service with Ukraine
