= AA8 =

AA-8 or AA8 may refer to:

- Molniya R-60, a Soviet lightweight air-to-air missile whose NATO reporting name is the AA-8 'Aphid'
- Hieroglyph for irrigation tunnels (𓐖) (Gardiner's designated symbol AA8)
