= Geran (weapons family) =

Russian family of drones and cruise missiles

- Geran-2 drones stored near Tsymbulova, Oryol Oblast
- Type: One-way attack drone Cruise missile
- Place of origin: Iran; Russia

Service history
- In service: 2022-present
- Used by: Armed Forces of Russian Federation
- Wars: Russo-Ukrainian war

Production history
- Designer: Shahed Aviation Industries
- Manufacturer: Yelabuga drone factory
- Developed from: Shahed drones
- Produced: 2022-present
- Variants: Geran-1; Geran-2; Geran-3; Geran-4; Geran-5

Geran (Russian: Герань; lit. 'Geranium') is a series of Russian expendable strike weapons initially derived from Iran's Shahed series of one-way attack drones. It includes the propeller-driven Geran-1 and Geran-2 loitering munitions and turbojet-powered cruise missiles, including the Geran-3, Geran-4, and Geran-5. Each principal model has numerous subvariants, differing in warhead, navigation and anti-jamming equipment, communications links, seekers, and airframe configuration. Developed and iteratively modified during Russia’s invasion of Ukraine, Geran weapons have been used extensively since 2022 in long-range strikes against targets inside Ukraine.

== Origin ==
Russia’s adoption of the Shahed-derived Geran family arose from the demands of its invasion of Ukraine: the need for large numbers of inexpensive, long-range, precision-guided strike weapons that could saturate Ukrainian air defenses. Iranian-made Shahed-131 and Shahed-136 one-way attack drones began reaching Russia in August 2022 and were fielded in Ukraine by September 2022. These systems offered a low-cost means of striking targets hundreds of kilometres from the front, and Russia used them in massed attacks intended to overwhelm air defenses and sustain pressure on Ukrainian infrastructure.

The initial systems were imported rather than Russian-designed. Iran supplied Shahed-131 and Shahed-136 drones early in the invasion; the larger Shahed-136 was redesignated Geran-2 in Russian service, while the smaller Shahed-131 became Geran-1. Early imports were expensive by the standards of the system’s later Russian production: Ukrainian intelligence cited by CNN estimated that Russia initially paid roughly $200,000 per drone, compared with about $70,000 for drones produced at Russia’s Alabuga facility.

To reduce dependence on Iranian deliveries and increase output, Russia established production at the Alabuga Special Economic Zone in Tatarstan. The arrangement began as a form of licensed assembly: Iran shipped complete but disassembled drones to Alabuga, where they were assembled as Geran-2; over time, the plant was intended to shift from assembly to domestic airframe production and then to local manufacture of internal components. Internal documents reported by The Washington Post and analyzed by the Institute for Science and International Security described a phased plan under which Alabuga would begin assembling Iranian-supplied drones in early 2023, move to domestic airframe production, and establish production lines for internal components during the second half of 2023. Alabuga operated under contract to the Russian military to manufacture Iranian-designed Shahed-136 UAVs for use in the war against Ukraine. Satellite imagery and internal planning documents indicated rapid construction and expansion at the site, with Alabuga planning to supply 1,400 Geran-2 drones to the Russian military by the end of October 2023. The resulting production base allowed Russia to move beyond reliance on imported Iranian systems, although early Russian-built aircraft still depended heavily on Iranian designs, components, and technical assistance.

This industrialization also created the foundation for wartime modification. Russian use of the Geran-2 in large-scale strikes provided operational experience that informed subsequent changes to navigation, communications, warheads, and propulsion; later Geran variants evolved from the same Shahed lineage into faster, longer-range, and increasingly missile-like systems. In this sense, the Geran family originated not as a single prewar Russian design program, but as an imported Iranian solution to a wartime requirement that Russia rapidly localized, expanded, and progressively adapted for sustained operations against Ukraine.

== Geran-1 ==
Shahed 131 infographic

The Geran-1 is Russia’s designation for the Iranian-made Shahed-131, the smaller member of the Shahed one-way attack drone family. It entered prominent Russian service in Ukraine in the autumn of 2022, when Russia began using Iranian-supplied Shahed systems for long-range strikes against Ukraine. The Geran-1 was therefore among the first Shahed-derived systems used in Russia’s campaign of massed long-range attacks, alongside the larger and more capable Geran-2.

The Geran-1 retained the Shahed-131’s small delta-wing configuration, but differed visibly from the Geran-2 in that its vertical stabilizers extended only above the fuselage rather than above and below it. It was a smaller, cheaper, expendable one-way attack platform intended to be launched in numbers and used against targets at ranges beyond the reach of conventional artillery. Its warhead and range were substantially smaller than those of the Geran-2. Reported characteristics include a warhead of roughly 15 kg and a range of about 900 km, making it better suited to tactical and operational-level targets than to the deep-strike role later associated with the Geran-2.

The Geran-1 was progressively overshadowed by the Geran-2. It offered a substantially larger warhead, longer range, and greater utility against the energy infrastructure and other strategic targets that became central to Russia’s strike campaign. As a result, the Geran-2 became the backbone of Russia’s Shahed-type strike effort, while the Geran-1 receded in prominence.

== Geran-2 ==
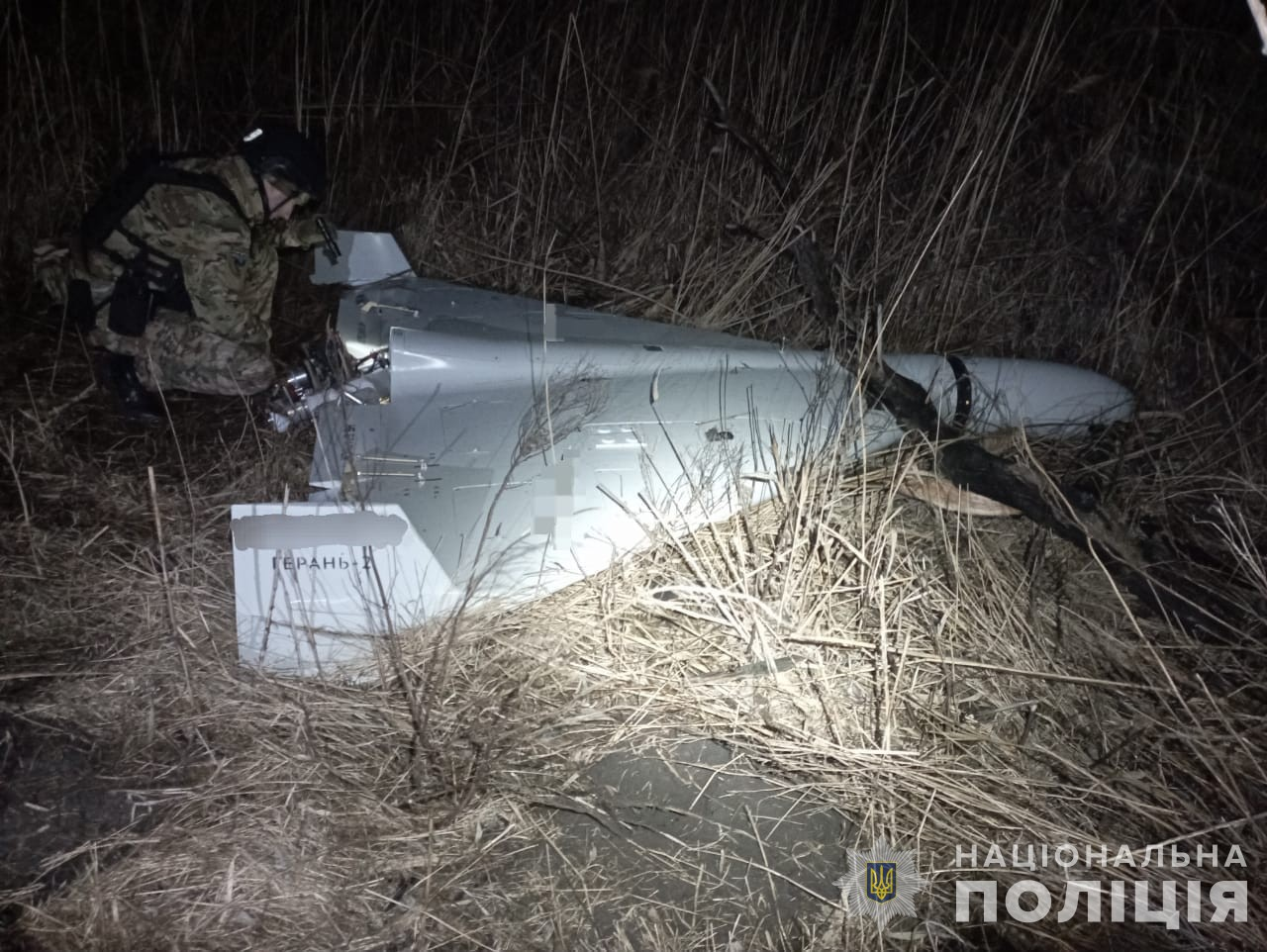
Almost undamaged Geran-2, crashed in the Dnipropetrovsk region

The Geran-2 is the Russian designation for Iran’s Shahed-136, a delta-wing, propeller-driven one-way attack drone with a rear-mounted piston engine driving a pusher propeller. Russia fielded the Shahed-136 in Ukraine by September 2022 under the Geran-2 designation. Its Iranian baseline used an approximately 50 hp Mado MD-550 engine, itself derived from the German Limbach L550E design, and a fiberglass/carbon-fiber/Nomex-honeycomb airframe. It carries a warhead of roughly 40–50 kg, with the original Iranian munition described as an approximately 118 lb two-stage penetrator. The system uses satellite navigation supported by an inertial navigation system; the Iranian baseline employed a Nasir GNSS receiver.

Russia initially relied on imported Iranian drones, but established production at the Alabuga Special Economic Zone in Tatarstan under a contract with the Russian military. Early production involved assembly of Iranian-supplied, disassembled drones; planning documents described a phased transition to Russian airframe production and, later, local manufacture of internal components.

The Geran-2 became the principal Shahed-derived system in Russia’s long-range strike campaign. Russia has employed Shahed-131 and Shahed-136 UAVs extensively since 2022, using inexpensive, expendable platforms in large numbers to saturate Ukrainian air defenses and inflict sustaining damage to infrastructure. Its role expanded beyond fixed-coordinate strikes. Russian-operated Geran-2s have been used with telemetry, cameras, cellular modems, and mesh-radio links, allowing battle-damage reporting, target observation, and in some cases real-time redirection by an operator.

=== Russian upgrades ===
Russian service transformed the Geran-2 into a continually modified weapons family. Center for Strategic and International Studies describes the Geran as a license-built variant used as a base platform for unprecedented wartime iteration.

Major changes included:

1. Airframe materials: Some variants replaced the Iranian-style Nomex honeycomb construction with a foam-and-carbon-fiber composite sandwich, likely for structural and radar-signature reasons.
2. Propulsion and components: Russian production replaced the Iranian Mado engine with Chinese copies of Limbach-derived engines, reducing reliance on Iranian components while retaining the same basic piston-propulsion concept.
3. Navigation and jamming resistance: Russian variants replaced the Iranian Nasir receiver with Kometa-M4/M8/M12/M16 controlled-reception-pattern antennas and B-105 navigation modules, progressively improving resistance to GPS jamming and spoofing.
4. Communications and control: The addition of telemetry, cameras, 3G/4G modems, and mesh-radio links enabled damage assessment, target observation, and limited real-time redirection.
5. Warheads: Russia introduced a range of locally developed warheads, including BSF-50 fragmentation-HE rounds with tungsten balls, BST-52 shaped-charge/incendiary rounds, OFZBCh-50 fragmentation-HE-incendiary rounds, TBBCh-50M thermobaric rounds, and heavier approximately 90 kg KOFZBCh-90 combined-effects rounds.
6. Auxiliary roles: Some Geran-2s have been adapted to carry anti-tank mines, air-to-air missiles, or FPV drones, and to serve as communications relays or drone carriers.

Thus, while the Geran-2 began as a localized Shahed-136, wartime modification made it a distinct Russian derivative family rather than a simple rebranded Iranian drone.

== Geran-3 ==
The Geran-3 is Russia’s turbojet-powered cruise missile, a development of the Geran-2. It was inspired by Iran’s Shahed-238, but it was not a direct copy: unlike the Shahed-238, which used a purpose-built airframe with an internally integrated turbojet, the Geran-3 retained the basic Geran-2/Shahed-136 airframe and replaced its piston engine with a turbojet.

The Geran-3 uses a Chinese-made Telefly JT80 turbojet, externally mounted at the rear of the fuselage. This substitution raised its speed to roughly 300–370 km/h, compared with the much slower propeller-driven Geran-2, while its reported range is about 1,000 km. Ukrainian intelligence reported that the Geran-3’s internal layout and electronic units remained similar to those of the Geran-2, including a comparable camera and video-transmission system. The type therefore represents an interim, relatively simple jet-powered adaptation of the Geran-2 rather than a clean-sheet Russian equivalent of the Shahed-238. According to the Ukrainian Main Directorate of Intelligence, the Geran-3 design, which was based directly on the Geran-2, lacked the structural strength for high-speed flight and maneuvering. As a result of these shortcomings, the Geran-4 was developed. Production of the Geran-3 was halted c. August 2026.

== Geran-4 ==
The Geran-4 is based on the Geran-3 design, featuring an improved airframe and a Chinese-made turbojet engine producing 160 kgf (1,600 N; 350 lbf) of thrust. According to Ukrainian intelligence, the drone can fly at a speed of 500 km/h (310 mph) while carrying a 50 kg (110 lb) warhead and has a maximum range of 600 to 850 km (370 to 530 mi). Geran-4 drones were first spotted in Ukraine in January 2026.

== Geran-5 ==
On 11 January 2026, Russia deployed a new jet-powered missile called the Geran-5, with a different structure to earlier Geran's closer to that of convemtional cruise missile. It can fly at speeds of up to 600 kilometres per hour (370 mph) with a 90-kilogram warhead, 1,000-kilometer strike range, and has thermal cameras, an AI targeting systems, Russian anti-jamming antennas and Chinese mesh radio network modems. It has the ability to be launched in flight by Su-25 aircraft according to HUR. Additionally, it can carry R-73 air-to-air missiles. It is powered by a Chinese-made Telefly jet engine with both satellite and 3G/4G modem guidance. With a 5.5-meter wingspan and 6 meters in length, its profile has been described as "resembling that of a cruise missile", and an analysis of its design showed technological similarities with the HESA Karrar. The Geran-5 reportedly contains a Raspberry Pi computer.

== See also ==
- Gerbera (drone)
