= Geran-4 =

- A Geran-4 in flight
- Type: One-way attack drone Cruise missile
- Place of origin: Russia

Service history
- Used by: Russia
- Wars: Russo-Ukrainian war

Production history
- Manufacturer: JSC Alabuga
- Developed from: Geran-3
- Unit cost: $85,000–$120,000
- Produced: 2025–present
- Variants: Geran-4 Seeker

Specifications (October 2026)
- Mass: 450 kg (990 lb) (MTOW)
- Length: 3.6 m (12 ft)
- Wingspan: 3.05 m (10.0 ft)
- Warhead weight: 50–90 kilograms (110–200 lb)
- Engine: TRD-2000 turbojet engine
- Operational range: c. 770 km (480 mi)
- Flight altitude: 4,000 m (13,000 ft)
- Maximum speed: 350–450 km/h (220–280 mph)
- Guidance system: GNSS, INS, Optical navigation
- Launch platform: Rocket-assisted take-off

The Geran-4 (Russian: Герань-4, lit. 'Geranium-4') is a Russian turbojet-powered one-way attack drone. Its design significantly differs from previous Geran as it closely resembles a cruise missile. It was developed from the "Geran-3" jet drone and is manufactured by JSC Alabuga in Tatarstan. Geran-4 drones were first used in May 2026 during Russian strikes against Ukraine.

== Overview ==
=== Development and production ===
Since 2022, Russia has been using Iranian Shahed drones in attacks against Ukraine. These were slow, propeller-driven Shahed 136 drones, designated and also built in Russia as the Geran-2. Because of the increasing effectiveness of Ukrainian interceptor drones, Russia began using jet powered drones. These were the Shahed 238, further developed in Russia as the Geran-3, and were powered by a Chinese Telefly JT80 turbojet engine. These drones were first used in 2024.

According to the Ukrainian Main Directorate of Intelligence (HUR), the Geran-3 design, which was based directly on the Geran-2, lacked the structural strength for high-speed flight and maneuvering. As a result of these shortcomings, the Geran-4 was developed. Production of the Geran-3 was halted c. August 2026.

Serial production of the Geran-4 and the Geran-5 takes place in Yelabuga at JSC Alabuga, while other Russian enterprises provide various components. In May 2026, Russia began expanding its facilities, and production of the two jet-powered drones reached 3,000 per month by August 2026, surpassing the Geran-2 production, which was reported at around 2,800 drones per month.

=== Design and components ===
Wreckage with engine remains of a Geran-4 in Kyiv, August 2026

Compared to the Geran-3, the Geran-4 features an improved airframe with reinforced structural elements and a better aerodynamic design. Its wings were integrated into the fuselage, and several external maintenance hatches were removed, thus reducing drag.

The Geran-4 originally used two types of Chinese turbojet engines: the 160 kgf (1,600 N; 350 lbf) Telefly LX-WP-160, or the more powerful 200 kgf (2,000 N; 440 lbf) Telefly TF-TJ2000A, which is also used on the Geran-5. In October 2026, HUR reported that the Geran-4 engine was replaced by a Russian-made engine manufactured at Alabuga and designated TRD-2000, equivalent to the Chinese ones. With this type of engine, the Geran-4 can maneuver at speeds of 300 to 400 km/h (190 to 250 mph) and can reach a maximum speed of 500 km/h (310 mph). It can also reach up to 5 km (3.1 mi) in altitude, complicating interception efforts.

The Geran-4 can carry a 50 kg (110 lb) OFZBCH-50/TBBCH-50M high-explosive fragmentation/thermobaric warhead, or a larger 90 kg (200 lb) TBBCH-90 thermobaric warhead over a distance of 450 to 770 km (280 to 480 mi). To avoid navigation jamming, the drone uses a multi-element controlled reception pattern antenna, a Chinese mesh radio network modem, as well as cellular modems with SIM cards.

The autumn 2026 upgrade added a magnetometer to improve navigation accuracy. An optical camera system was also integrated to further assist navigation. The system utilizes the camera to compare the terrain with a previously saved reference image and help determine if the drone is on the correct route. Another addition was the KRSN special cumulative-cutting charge warhead. This warhead could target specific structural elements, such as those on bridges or overhead power line pylons.

Analyzing the Geran-4, HUR identified about 55 components sourced from companies in China, the United States, Taiwan, Japan, Switzerland, Germany, and the United Kingdom. A further analysis done by the Support Forces of the Armed Forces of Ukraine determined that over three-quarters of the Geran-4's computer consists of American-made parts, most of which are from Texas Instruments. Other identified computer parts come from China, Germany, Japan, Taiwan, and the Netherlands.

=== Geran-4 Seeker ===
In the summer of 2026, Russia began using a "Seeker" variant of the Geran-4. Like the Seeker variants of the Geran-2 and Geran-3, its role is detecting, identifying, and tracking a target during the terminal attack phase. The Geran-4 version is the most advanced of the three, with target acquisition systems fully integrated into its design and the highest level of autonomous targeting and guidance. OSINT sources noted that the target acquisition system provides object detection and image recognition using electro-optical sensors.

== Service history ==
According to HUR, Russia started testing the Geran-4 between October and December 2025, and continued until January 2026 with flights in the Oryol Oblast. That same month, images showing a Geran-4 equipped with an R-60 missile also appeared. The first combat missions with Geran-4 drones took place in May 2026. Since then, increasing numbers of jet-powered drones have been used in attacks on Ukraine. Between June and August, the usage of jet-powered drones increased roughly six times, with Kyiv and the surrounding regions targeted most.

On 27 June, Geran-4s struck Ukrainian MiG-29s that were preparing to take off from the Voznesensk Airfield. The Russian Defence Ministry reported two fighters destroyed, while the Ukrainian Air Force Command confirmed the loss of one aircraft during the attack. In July, the Russian Armed Forces struck a parking site with Geran-4 Seeker drones in the Dnepropetrovsk Region, destroying several trucks and tractors carrying drones for the Ukrainian Armed Forces which were preparing for attacks against Russian regions.

Geran-4 drones launched from Crimea also attacked as far as Lviv and Lutsk. Other Geran-4 strikes took place in the ports of Odesa, Mykolaiv and in the Black Sea, targeting tankers and cargo ships.

On 29 September, a Ukrainian interceptor drone operated by the National Guard of Ukraine managed to shoot down a Geran-4 for the first time. On 18 October, the Ukrainian Air Force released footage of a MiG-29 shooting down a Geran-4 using an air-to-air missile.

=== Non-combatant country incidents ===
On 8 September 2026, a Geran-4 drone entered the airspace of Moldova, crossed over the Transnistria region, approached Chișinău and Ungheni, then left Moldova and entered Romanian airspace. The unmanned aerial vehicle then flew within 18 km (11 mi) of Roman before disappearing from radar. It reappeared in Moldova and subsequently crashed, triggering some vegetation fires. Two Spanish Air Force F-18s were scrambled but failed to intercept the drone. Additionally, 11 other NATO aircraft, including E-3 Sentry AWACS airplanes, operating in the Black Sea did not spot the drone. According to a statement by the Norwegian Prime Minister, and confirmed by the Moldovan Government, the drone's flight near Chișinău endangered President Volodymyr Zelenskyy's aircraft which was preparing to take off from Chișinău International Airport on a flight to Norway. Other Geran-4 drones have also crashed in Moldova later that month.

In October 2026, two ships were struck by drones in Bulgaria's exclusive economic zone, one of which quickly sank. According to Ukraine, Russia was behind the attack. Cameron Chell, co-founder of the Draganfly UAV company, believes that Russia utilized Geran-4 UAVs as well as Maran USVs. According to him, for a ship to sink quickly after being struck by drones, the impact must happen at the waterline, whereas a Geran-4 attacks from a steep angle in the terminal phase. This theory would highlight an advanced coordination between aerial and naval drones.

On 17 October, another incident occurred when two Russian Geran-4 drones were shot down by two Romanian Air Force F-16 fighters on quick reaction alert duty after flying into Romanian airspace. Detected by radar around 120 km (75 mi) east of Snake Island in the late afternoon, the two drones were engaged about 11 and 13 nmi (20 and 24 km; 13 and 15 mi) east/south-east of Sulina and shot down using AIM-9X Sidewinder missiles after flying for two and five minutes over the country's territorial waters, marking the first time NATO fighters destroyed Geran-4 drones.
