= Amirabad Port =

Special Economic Zone And Port in Iran

- Interactive map of Amirabad Port
- Location within Iran

Location
- Country: Iran
- Location: Behshahr, Mazandaran
- Coordinates: 36.850°N 53.365°E
- UN/LOCODE: IRAMP

Details
- Opened: April, 2001
- Operated by: Port & Maritime Organization of Iran|Port & Maritime Organization
- No. of berths: 34
- General Manager: MohammadAli Mousapour Gorji
- Deputy Of Marine: Habib allah Talebi
- Deputy Of Technical: Mehdi Aghapour
- Deputy Director of Port and Economic: Aliakbar Sayyad

Statistics
- Website amirabadport.pmo.ir

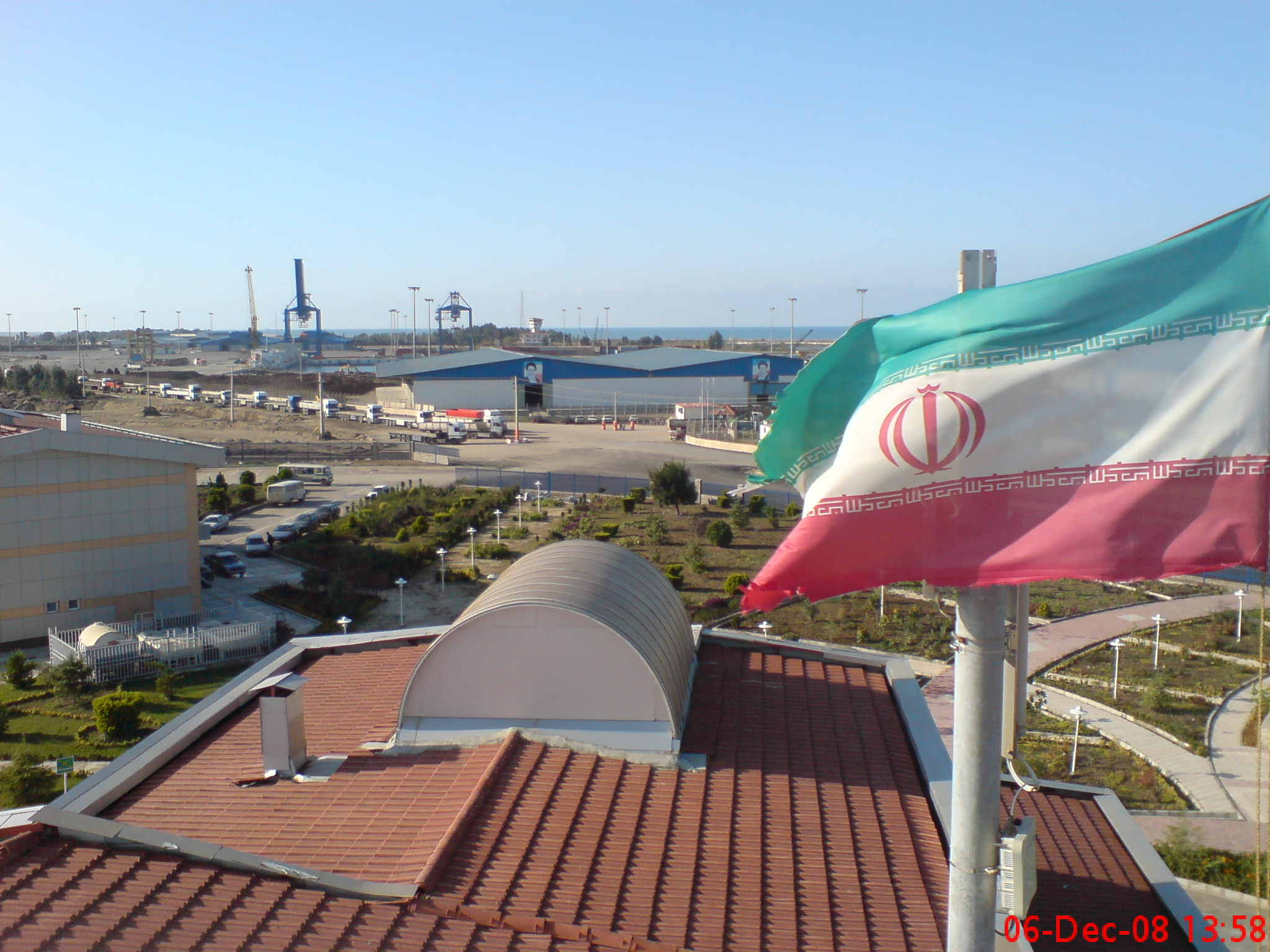
View of Amirabad Port with the Iranian flag in the foreground

Amirabad Port or Amirabad Special Economic Zone And Port (Persian: fa: بندر امیرآباد) is the largest port on the Caspian Sea. It is located in the north of Behshahr County, next to the peninsula and the biosphere reserve of Miankaleh in Iran.

The port has been designed in 3 phases, but until 2023 only the first phase has been fully operational.

According to statistics for unloading and loading of goods in 2020, this port is the fourth largest port in Iran, after Shahid Rajaei, Imam Khomeini and Qeshm port, and the largest port in Iran on the shore of the Caspian Sea.

It is connected to the Iran Railway, benefiting from 15 berths with a capacity of 7.5 million tons and from the connection capacity of the North-South International Transit Corridor (INSTC). The port, with an area of 1060 hectares, is the largest port in northern Iran.

In June 2023, a US intelligence finding reported that the port was used by Iran to supply Russia with both Iranian unmanned combat aerial vehicles (military drones) and equipment for building the Yelabuga drone factory, both for use in the Russian invasion of Ukraine.

== Amirabad Port at a glance ==
- Cargo warehouse: 6.5 hectares
- Land Area: 1060 hectares
- Annual Capacity: 7.5 million tons
- Berth: 15 berths about 2600 meters
- Draft: 6 meters
- Internal rail network: 25 km
- Cargo storage area: 200 hectares
