= R-60 (missile) =

Vympel R-60 AA-8 "Aphid"
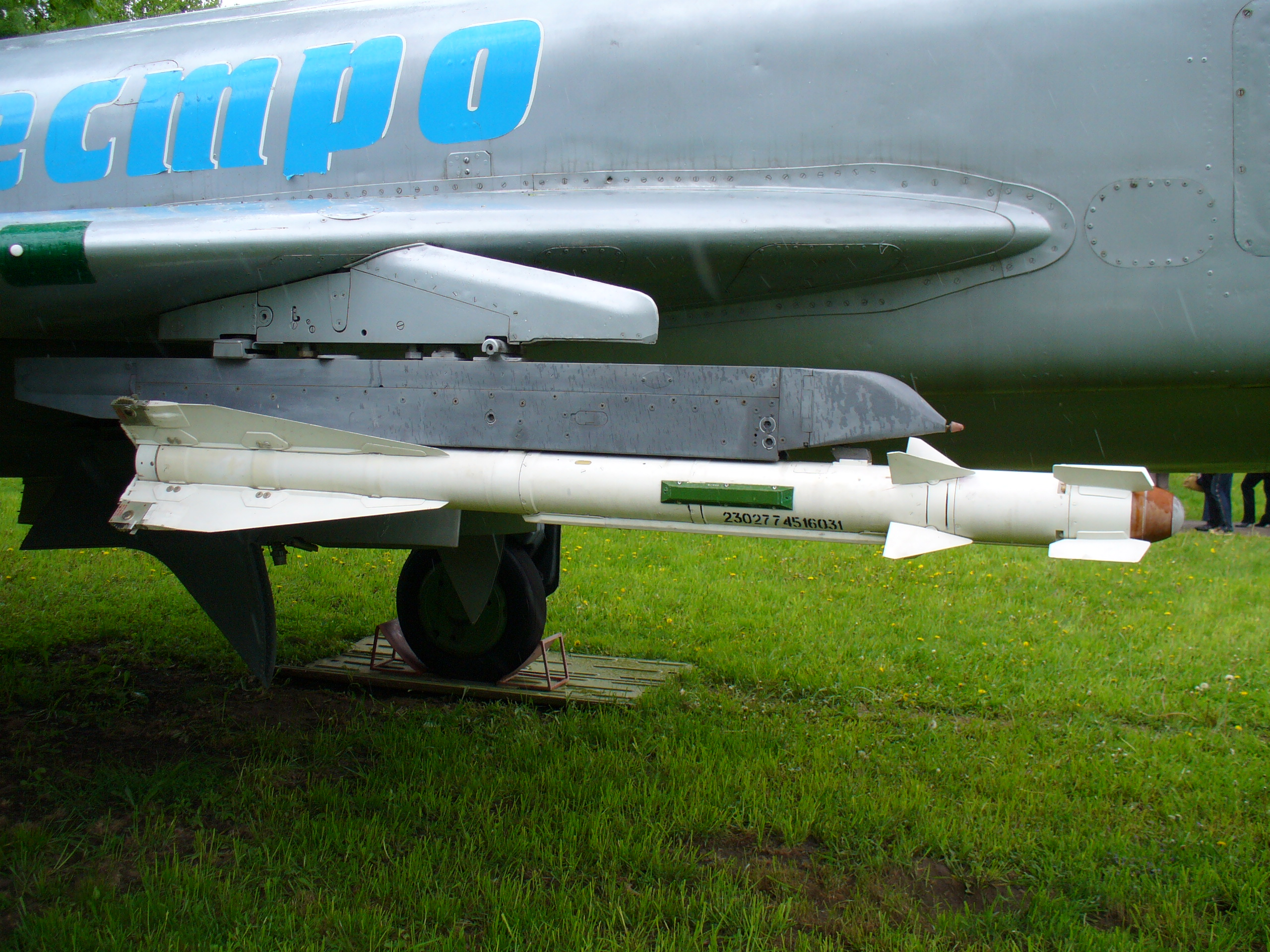
- Type: Lightweight short-range air-to-air missile
- Place of origin: Soviet Union

Service history
- In service: 1970–present
- Wars: Iran–Iraq War; South African Border War; Lebanese Civil War; Russo-Ukrainian war

Production history
- Manufacturer: Vympel

Specifications
- Mass: 44 kg (97 lb)
- Length: 2,090 mm (6 ft 10 in)
- Diameter: 120 mm (4.7 in)
- Wingspan: 390 mm (15 in)
- Warhead: 3 kg (6.6 lb)
- Detonation mechanism: proximity
- Engine: Solid-fuel rocket engine
- Operational range: 8 kilometres (5.0 mi)
- Flight altitude: 20,000 m (66,000 ft)
- Maximum speed: Mach 2.47 (1,894 mph, 3,048 kmh, 1,645 kn)
- Guidance system: Infrared homing
- Launch platform: MiG-21, MiG-23, MiG-25, MiG-27, MiG-29, MiG-31, Su-15, Su-17, Su-20, Su-22, Su-24, Su-25, Yak-28, Yak-38, Yak-141, Mi-24, BAE Systems Hawk, L39ZA, J-22 Orao

The Molniya (now Vympel) R-60 (NATO reporting name: AA-8 "Aphid") is a short-range lightweight infrared homing air-to-air missile designed for use by Soviet fighter aircraft. It has been widely exported, and remains in service with the Commonwealth of Independent States and many other nations.

== History ==
The R-60 was initially developed for the MiG-23. Work began on the weapon, under the bureau designation K-60 (izdeliye 62), in the late 1960s. Series production began in 1973. It entered service with the designation R-60 (NATO reporting name "Aphid-A").

When introduced, the R-60 was one of the world's lightest and most agile air-to-air missiles, with a launch weight of 44 kg (97 lb). It has infrared guidance, with an uncooled Komar (Mosquito) seeker head. Control is by forward rudders with large rear fins. The distinctive canards on the nose, known as "destabilizers," serve to improve the rudders' efficiency at high angles of attack. The R-60 uses a very small, 3 kg (6.6 lb), tungsten expanding-rod warhead.

According to Russian sources, practical engagement range is about 4,000 m (4,400 yd), although "brochure range" is 8 km (5.0 mi) at high altitude. The weapon was one of the most agile air-to-air missiles until the advent of thrust vectored missiles like the R-73 and AIM-9X. The R-60 can be used by aircraft maneuvering at up to 9g against targets maneuvering at up to 8g. A tactical advantage is the short minimum range of only 300 m (330 yd).

Soviet practice was to manufacture most air-to-air missiles with interchangeable IR-homer and semi-active radar homing (SARH) seekers – however, an SARH version of the R-60 was never contemplated due to the small size of the missile which makes a radar-homing version with an antenna of reasonable size impractical.

An inert training version, alternatively designated UZ-62 and UZR-60, was also built.

An upgraded version, the R-60M (NATO reporting name: "Aphid-B"), using a nitrogen-cooled seeker with an expanded view angle of ±20°, was introduced around 1982. Although its seeker is more sensitive than its predecessor, the R-60M has only limited all-aspect capability. Minimum engagement range was further reduced, to only 200 m (220 yd). The proximity fuzes had improved resistance to ECM, although both optical and radar fuzes remained available. The export version with the Kolibri-M Radar-fuze are designated R-60MK (NATO reporting name: "Aphid-C"). The R-60M is 42 mm (1.7 in) longer, and has a heavier, 3.5 kg (7.7 lb) continuous-rod warhead, increasing launch weight to 45 kg (99 lb). In the R-60M the continuous rod warhead now uses 2.8 kg (6.2 lb) of depleted uranium rods for enhanced fragmentation.,

The inert training version of the R-60M was the R-60MU.

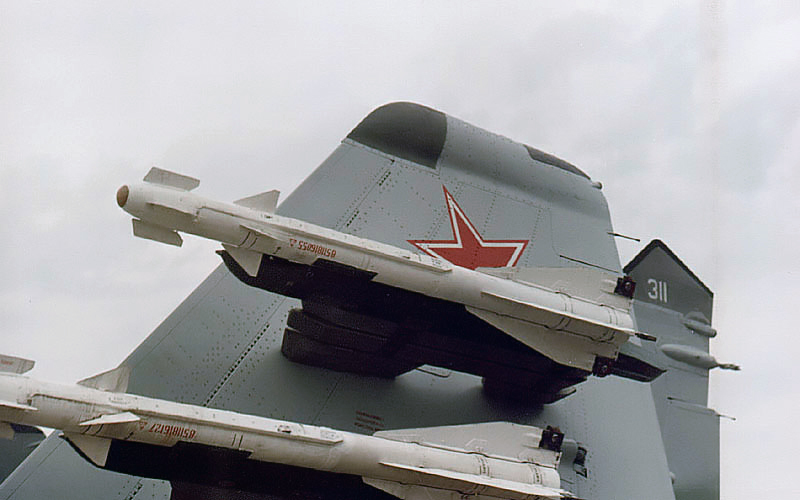
Two R-60 missiles mounted under the folded up wing of a MiG-29K

Since 1999, a modified version of the weapon has been used as a surface-to-air missile (SAM) as part of the Yugoslav M55A3B1 towed anti-aircraft artillery system. It has also been seen carried on a twin rail mount on a modified M53/59 Praga armored SPAAG of (former) Czechoslovak origin. These missiles have been modified with the addition of a first stage booster motor, with the missile's own motor becoming the sustainer. This was done in lieu of modifying the missile's motor for ground launch, as in the case of the US MIM-72 Chaparral.

The current Russian dogfight missile is the R-73 (AA-11 "Archer"), but large numbers of R-60 missiles remain in service.

== Operational history ==
=== Soviet Union ===
On 20 April 1978, two R-60 missiles were fired at Korean Air Lines Flight 902 after a navigational error had caused it to fly into Soviet airspace. One missile hit, detaching 4 meters of the left wing and killing 2 passengers. The plane made an emergency landing on a frozen lake.

On 21 June 1978, a PVO MiG-23M flown by Pilot Captain V. Shkinder shot down two Iranian Boeing CH-47 Chinook helicopters that had trespassed into Soviet airspace, one helicopter being dispatched by two R-60 missiles and the other by cannon fire.

=== Syria ===
Several Russian reports affirm the R-60 was widely used during the 1982 Lebanon war, and it was the main weapon used by the Syrians in air-to-air combat. Some Russian reports affirm that the R-60 was the most successful air-to-air missile deployed by the Syrians in Lebanon over the Bekaa Valley. According to Israeli reports, the vast majority of air-to-air combat consisted of visual range dogfights, and this has been also confirmed by Russian sources. The Russian reports also mentioned that several F-4s, F-16s, and IAI Kfirs were destroyed by R-60s among other aircraft. Israel claims some F-4s and Kfirs were lost in 1982, but lists surface-to-air missiles as responsible for all Israeli aircraft losses. However, on 9 June 1982, a Syrian MiG-21 heavily damaged an F-15 using an R-60, but the Israeli aircraft was able to make it back to its base and was subsequently repaired.

=== Iraq ===
On 11 August 1984, during the Iran–Iraq War, an Iraqi Air Force MiG-23ML shot down an Iranian F-14A piloted by Hashem All-e-Agha using an R-60.

Iraqi MiG-23s damaged two EF-111A Raven by R-60s during the Gulf War.

On 19 January 1991, during the Gulf War, Iraqi air force pilot Jameel Sayhood claimed to have shot down a Royal Air Force Panavia Tornado with an R-60 missile. However, the Royal Air Force claimed that the aircraft crashed on 22 January 1991 on a bombing mission in Ar Rutba.

=== Angola/Cuba ===
On 27 September 1987, during Operation Moduler, two Cuban FAR MiG-23MLs intercepted Captain Arthur Piercy's Mirage F1CZ, which was damaged by an R-60 fired head-on by Major Alberto Ley Rivas. The explosion destroyed the aircraft's drag chute and damaged the hydraulics. Piercy was able to recover to AFB Rundu, but the aircraft overshot the runway. The impact with the rough terrain caused Piercy's ejection seat to fire, but he failed to separate from the seat and suffered major spinal injuries.

=== India ===
In 1999, an Indian Air Force MiG-21 used an infrared-homing R-60 to bring down a Pakistani Navy Breguet Atlantic which intruded over Indian airspace. Part of the wreckage was found in contested territory, this incident is widely known as the Atlantic incident.

=== Ukraine ===
In 2024, the R-60 has seen some minor use by the Armed Forces of Ukraine during the Russian invasion, being reportedly adapted for the surface-to-air role and mounted on Sea Baby naval drones. The R-60M has also been mounted on Su-25s, possibly for shooting down drones.

On December 1, 2025, an R-60 missile mounted on a Russian-made Geran-2 kamikaze jet engine drone was spotted. After the Geran-2 was shot down by a Sting anti-drone system, debris images also showed the remains of the R-60 missile. This was the first time this type of deployment had been seen in combat. In May 2026 remains of Russian depleted uranium R-60M were found in Ukraine's Chernihiv region.

Starting in November 2025, Ukraine began modernising its stocks of R-60 missiles. Involving the replacement of analog parts with digital parts, initially it was aimed at ground based air defence systems. However the increased use of Russian jet engine Geran-4 and Geran-5 missile drones and cruise missiles, such as the S8000 Banderol, have depleted Ukrainian stocks of R-73s. Ukraine also lacks the ability to make new R-73s. Therefore MiG-29s have been seen equipped only with R-60 missiles. The replacement of older analog parts has led to “some companies have achieved nearly a tenfold improvement in sensor sensitivity.”

== Operators ==
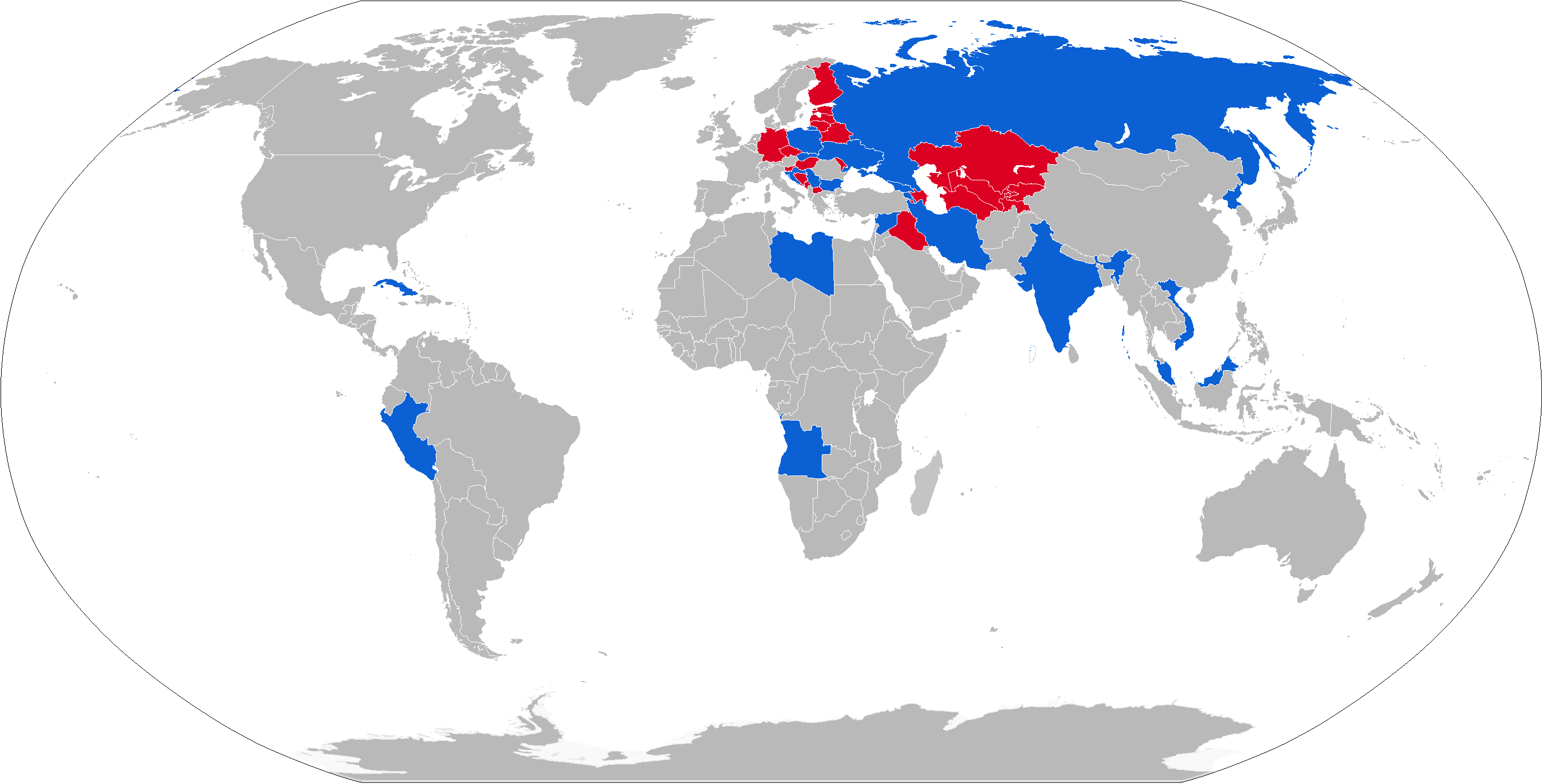
Map with R-60 operators in blue and former operators in red

=== Current operators ===
- Algeria
- Angola
- Azerbaijan
- Belarus
- Eritrea
- Ethiopia
- Georgia
- India
- Iran
- Kazakhstan
- Libya
- North Korea
- Peru
- Poland
- Russia − Used by the Air Force and Naval Aviation
- Serbia
- Sudan
- Syria
- Turkmenistan
- Ukraine
- Uzbekistan
- Vietnam

=== Former operators ===
- Afghanistan
- Bulgaria
- China
- Croatia − R-60 and R-60MK
- Cuba − Used on MiG-21, MiG-23, and MiG-29, aircraft no longer operational.
- Czechoslovakia − Passed on to successor states.
- Czech Republic
- East Germany
- Finland − Was used on the MiG-21bis
- Germany
- Hungary
- Iraq
- Malaysia
- Romania
- Slovakia
- Soviet Union − Passed on to successor states.
- South Yemen
- Yemen
- Yugoslavia − Passed on to successor states.
- Zimbabwe
