= Gerbera (drone) =

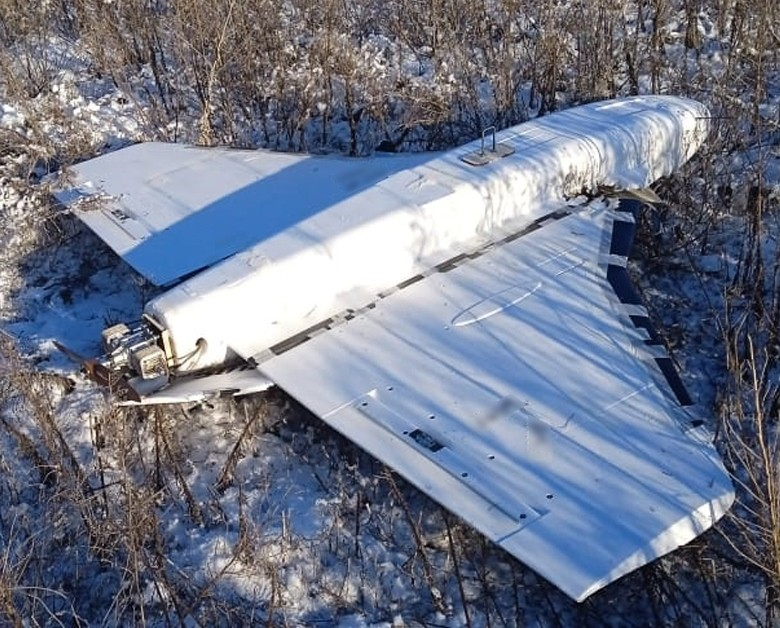
- Gerbera drone, downed in Ukraine (January 2025)
- Type: Loitering munition
- Place of origin: Russia

Service history
- In service: July 2024–present
- Used by: Russia
- Wars: Russian invasion of Ukraine

Production history
- Manufacturer: JSC Alabuga; Skywalker Technology Co. (alleged by Defense Intelligence of Ukraine)
- Unit cost: US$10,000

Specifications
- Length: 2 m (6.6 ft)
- Wingspan: 2.5 m (8.2 ft)
- Operational range: estimates 300 to 600 km (190 to 370 mi) (decoy version)
- Flight altitude: up to 3,000 m (9,800 ft)
- Maximum speed: up to 160 km/h (99 mph)

The Gerbera (Russian: Гербера) is a Russian multi-purpose drone, described as a cheaper and simplified version of the Iranian Shahed-136 (also known as the Geran-2 in Russia). It is designed for kamikaze missions, reconnaissance, and signal relaying to extend the operational range of other drones or enhance their resilience against electronic warfare.

The Gerbera was first deployed by Russian forces in July 2024 during the Russo-Ukrainian war. It was originally used as a decoy to distract and overwhelm Ukrainian air defense due to its visual similarity to the deadlier Shahed-136. By mid-2025, it was also being used for reconnaissance and strikes.

During two separate incidents in July 2025, one confirmed and one suspected Gerbera drone entered Lithuanian NATO airspace, in what some analysts described as hybrid warfare provocations. In September 2025, drones of this type entered Polish airspace.

== Development ==
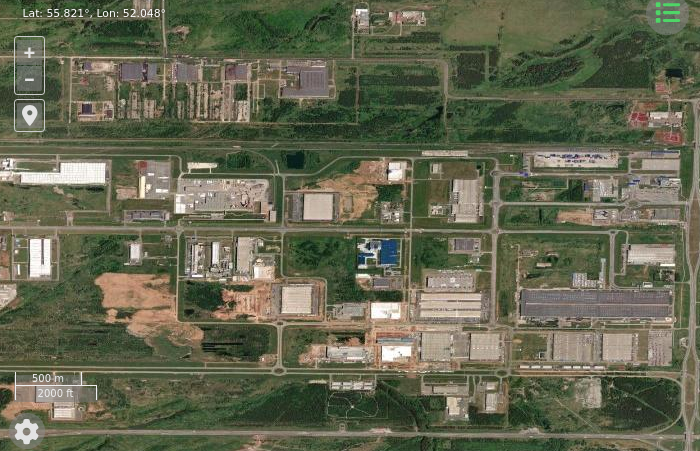
Satellite imagery of the Yelabuga drone factory

Initial reporting on the Gerbera, based on uncorroborated material from a Russian social media account, claimed that the drone was developed by the Russian company Gastello Design Bureau. The Defense Intelligence of Ukraine claims that the Chinese company Skywalker Technology is the real developer.

According to Ukrainian intelligence, Skywalker Technology assembles drone kits and ships them to the Alabuga drone factory in Yelabuga, Russia, where they are finalized for operational use. Gerbera is not listed in Skywalker Technology's product catalog, suggesting it was developed specifically under a contract with the Russian Federation.

The drone incorporates chips and components from Analog Devices and Texas Instruments (USA), NXP Semiconductors (Netherlands), STMicroelectronics and U-Blox (Switzerland), and XLSEMI (China).

Ukrainian officials estimate that the Gerbera drone costs around $10,000 to produce, a fraction of the price of the Shahed-136.

== Description and features ==
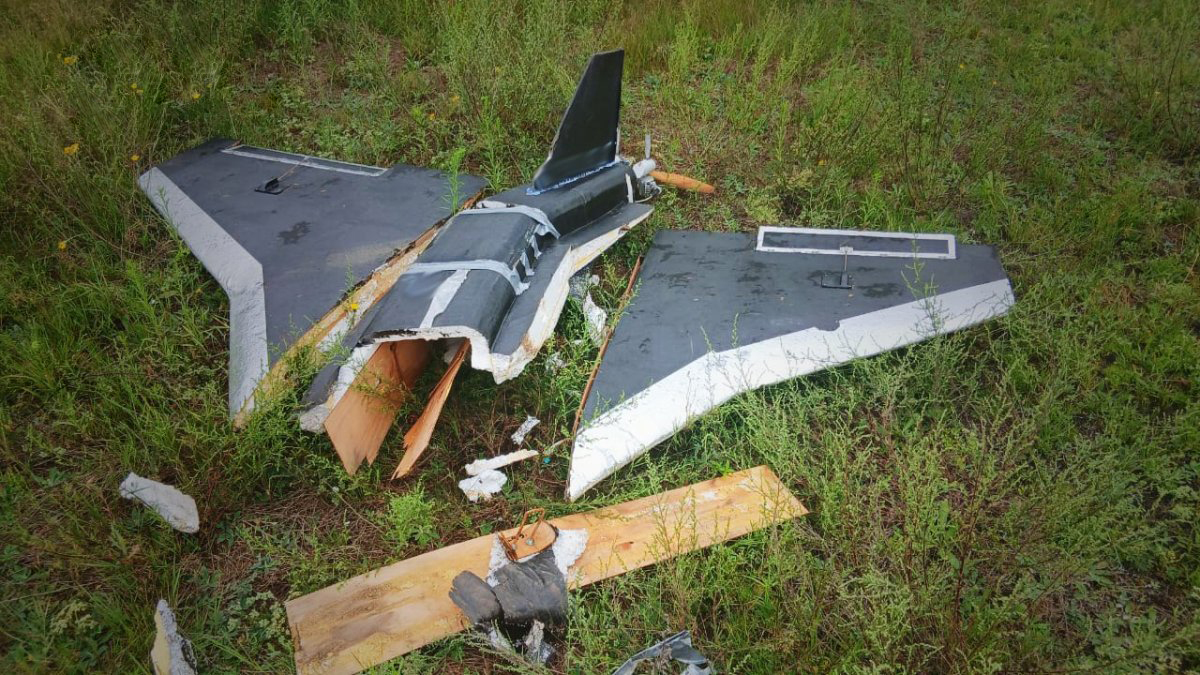
Downed Gerbera, with its foam-and-plywood construction visible

The Gerbera is made of inexpensive materials. It is composed of an internal plywood frame covered by a body made of polystyrene foam. The Gerbera has a similar cropped delta-wing shape to that of the Shahed-136, but is somewhat smaller.

Like the Shahed-136, the Gerbera has a pusher propeller driven by an internal combustion engine. The engine is typically a DLE60 60 cc engine produced by the Chinese company Mile Hao Xiang Technology, which costs $430–$550 on Chinese marketplaces. The Stinger 70 cc engine produced by the Chinese company RCGF Stinger has also been observed.

The Gerbera drone has been observed equipped with components, including:

- A stabilized camera from Topotek (KHY10S90).
- A Mesh Network XK-F358 modem from Xingkay Tech.

These two components cost approximately $8,500 USD together. The mesh network allows interconnected drones to share data and relay signals from the operator, functioning as repeaters. This configuration increases resistance to electronic warfare, making it harder to disrupt the drone's operations.

Some but not all Gerberas carry an explosive charge. Ukrainian forces have observed Gerbera drones equipped with various small warheads containing up to 5 kilograms (11 lb) of explosives. This is significantly less than the Shahed's standard 50-kilogram (110 lb) warhead, or its newer 90-kilogram (200 lb) variant.

According to most sources, the Gerbera drone has a range of roughly 300 kilometres (190 mi) when not equipped with a combat payload, and a shorter range when so equipped. However, the sanctions database of the Defense Intelligence of Ukraine indicates a flight range of 600 kilometres (370 mi).

== Capabilities ==
According to the Russian social media post from July 2024 introducing the Gerbera, the drone can be deployed in three configurations:

- Kamikaze drone - Equipped with an explosive warhead for suicide missions.
- Reconnaissance - Conducts surveillance and intelligence-gathering.
- Decoy - Distracts air defense from other targets.

== Operational history ==
=== Russo-Ukrainian war ===
The Gerbera drone was first seen on the battlefield in late July 2024. Gerbera decoys were used in large numbers during Russian barrages, distracting Ukrainian air defenses from other drones and missiles.

In October 2024, Ukraine began deploying Sting drone-to-drone interceptors, developed by the non-profit organization Wild Hornets. Shortly thereafter, the first video of a Ukrainian front person view (FPV) interceptor drone taking down a Gerbera was released.

On 11 November 2024, the Defense Intelligence of Ukraine (DIU) reported that roughly half of the drones being launched by Russia were Shahed-mimicking decoys such as Gerberas and Parodiyas. According to AP News reporting around the same time, about 75% of new Russian drones being produced in Alabuga were such unarmed decoys. This Russian military deception tactic was dubbed Operation False Target by Russia. In November, the DIU also identified some versions of the Gerbera with warheads and reconnaissance capabilities.

In April 2025, the first known case of a Gerbera drone armed with a warhead being used for a direct tactical strike was documented.

On 18 May 2025, the Unmanned Systems Forces (USF) of Ukraine claimed that the Darknode unit of the 412th UAV Regiment, whose formation was announced in early April, had thus far used drones to intercept 100 enemy drones, of which 76 were Shahed-136s and 24 were Gerberas. The USF noted that interceptor drones can cost around $5,000, making them much cheaper than air defense missiles.

In July 2025, the Ukrainian defense company "General Chereshnya" posted the first footage of its "General Chereshnya AIR" drones intercepting multiple Gerberas mid-air.

On 5 August 2025, the State Border Guard Service of Ukraine reported that it was becoming more common for Gerbera drones to be found carrying warheads and urged anyone who found one not to approach it.

=== Incidents in Lithuania ===
Locations of the two crash sites in Lithuania

On 10 July 2025, an unmanned aircraft entered Lithuanian airspace from Belarus. It was initially thought to be a Shahed drone and was later identified as a Gerbera. It crashed near the Šumskas border checkpoint, about one kilometer from the Belarus–Lithuania border. Lithuanian Prime Minister Gintautas Paluckas and Speaker of Parliament Saulius Skvernelis were taken to a shelter as a precaution.

On 28 July 2025, another similar aircraft entered Lithuania from Belarus, prompting a large-scale emergency alert. On 1 August, the crashed drone was found at the Gaižiūnai military training area in central Lithuania, about 100 kilometres (60 mi) from the Belarusian border. The drone was armed with 2 kilograms (4 lb) of explosive material. Preliminary assessments suggested that it was a Gerbera. The Lithuanian Ministry of Foreign Affairs summoned a representative of the Belarusian embassy and demanded an explanation of the 28 July incident and the prevention of any further violations.

On 28 July, the Lithuanian military analyst Egidijus Papečkys stated that the incursions were most likely accidents, but noted the possibility of provocations or surveillance missions. On 1 August, Mindaugas Sinkevičius, the interim leader of the ruling Social Democratic Party, suggested that the incidents were likely intentional provocations, referencing the fact that the second drone had been found at a military training area. Lithuanian diplomat Eitvydas Bajarūnas likewise argued that the incursions were part of Russia's hybrid warfare. Defense Minister Dovilė Šakalienė stated that the leading theory was that the drones were disoriented by Ukrainian defenses and entered Lithuanian airspace by accident, but that the investigation was ongoing.

=== Incursion into Poland ===
On 9 September 2025, Gerbera drones were among over 19 drone incursions reported over eastern Poland, causing multiple F-35 fighter jets to engage targets. This is the first ever time NATO aircraft engaged enemy targets over NATO airspace. Two analysts quoted by BBC Verify concluded "that the scale of the incursion suggests it was almost certainly a deliberate act on Russia's part."

== See also ==
- Garpiya
- Italmas
