= Maksym Ustymenko =

Ukrainian fighter pilot (1993–2025)

- Максим Устименко
- Born: Максим Юрійович Устименко; 1993; Kharkiv, Ukraine
- Died: 29 June 2025 (aged 31); Near Sumy, Ukraine
- Alma mater: Ivan Kozhedub National Air Force University
- Military career
- Allegiance: Ukraine
- Branch: Ukrainian Air Force
- Service years: 2017–2025
- Rank: Pidpolkovnyk
- Conflicts: Russo-Ukrainian War †
- Awards: Order of the Gold Star (Posthumously); Order of Bohdan Khmelnytsky, 3rd class

Maksym Yuriiovych Ustymenko (Ukrainian: Максим Юрійович Устименко; 1993 – 29 June 2025) was a Ukrainian fighter pilot with the rank of Pidpolkovnyk in the Air Force of the Armed Forces of Ukraine. He was a participant of the Russo-Ukrainian war, during which he was killed in 2025. He was posthumously awarded the title of Hero of Ukraine.

== Biography ==
Born in 1993, he was a classmate of the fallen pilot and Hero of Ukraine Andrii Pilshchykov.

On the night of 29 June 2025, Ustymenko participated in efforts to intercept a massive Russian attack in an F-16 fighter jet, managing to destroy seven Russian Projectiles. While practicing on the last target his aircraft was damaged and began to lose altitude. He turned the aircraft away from populated areas but did not have time to eject, crashing near Sumy. His funeral was held on July 3 2026 in Kyiv.

== Personal life ==
Ustymenko had a son who was four years old at the time of his death.

== Awards ==
- Titled Hero of Ukraine with the Order of the Golden Star (29 June 2025, posthumously)
- Order of Bohdan Khmelnytsky, 3rd class (28 February 2022)

== Military ranks ==
- Colonel (as of 2025)
- Pidpolkovnyk (as of 2022)
