= Geran-5 =

- Geran-5 shown in a video presentation during the 2026 Moscow Victory Day Parade
- Type: One-way attack drone Cruise missile
- Place of origin: Russia

Service history
- Used by: Russia
- Wars: Russo-Ukrainian war

Production history
- Manufacturer: JSC Alabuga
- Unit cost: $90,000–$140,000
- Produced: 2026–present
- Variants: Geran-5 K5; Geran-5 K5-K

Specifications (original variant)
- Mass: 800 kg (1,800 lb) (MTOW)
- Length: 6.5 m (21 ft)
- Wingspan: 3.2 m (10 ft)
- Warhead weight: 90 kilograms (200 lb)
- Engine: Telefly TF-TJ2000A turbojet engine
- Operational range: 950 km (590 mi)
- Flight altitude: 5,000 m (16,000 ft)
- Maximum speed: 450–600 km/h (280–370 mph)
- Guidance system: GNSS, INS
- Launch platform: Rocket-assisted take-off or air launch

The Geran-5 (Russian: Герань-5, lit. 'Geranium-5') is a Russian turbojet-powered one-way attack drone. Its design significantly differs from previous Geran/Shahed drones as it closely resembles a cruise missile. The drone is produced by JSC Alabuga and was first utilized in attacks on Ukraine in early 2026.

== Overview ==
=== Development and production ===
The drone was first mentioned in a Ukrainian report from early 2026, which noted that Russia planned to conduct combat trials with the Geran-5. Unlike previous Geran drones, the Geran-5 is closer to a cruise missile. According to a senior researcher at the Norwegian Institute for Defence Studies, the Geran-5 was developed as a low-cost cruise missile placed between the cheaper Russian piston engine drones and the more expensive cruise and ballistic missiles such as the Kh-101 and the Iskander.

With a warhead of about 90 kg (200 lb), the drone is less destructive than regular cruise missiles. However, at an estimated value of around $115,000, the drone costs only a fraction of the traditional weapons systems. This instead enables Russia to manufacture these types of drones en masse.

Serial production of the Geran-5 along with the Geran-4 takes place at the Yelabuga drone factory. Various other components are provided by Russian enterprises. By August 2026, production of the two types of jet-powered drones reached 3,000 per month, surpassing the Geran-2 production which was reported at around 2,800 drones per month. Production of the two jet-powered drones reached 4,000 per month by October 2026.

=== Design and components ===
Compared to previous delta wing Geran drone designs, the Geran-5 resembles a cruise missile with a length of 6 m (20 ft) and a wingspan of 3.2 m (10 ft). The Ukrainian Main Directorate of Intelligence (HUR) noted the Geran-5 shows similarities with the Iranian HESA Karrar and alleges that it was likely developed from the Iranian drone.

The engine used on the Geran-5 is a Chinese 200 kgf (2,000 N; 440 lbf) Telefly TF-TJ2000A, enabling the drone to reach speeds of up to 600 km/h (370 mph). The estimated range is around 950 km (590 mi) with an endurance of two hours and a maximum altitude of around 6 km (3.7 mi). The fuselage, wings and empennage are made of carbon fiber, while the structure is from aluminium and iron.

For navigation, the Geran-5 is equipped with a Kometa-M12 satellite navigation system, and a telemetry data transmission system based on a Raspberry Pi microcomputer with 3G/LTE modems, and a Chinese mesh radio network modem. The electronic components identified by HUR originate from China, the United States, and Germany. The American and European microchips are imported by Russia via China.

In addition to its regular warhead, the drone could carry R-73 missiles. Besides launches from the ground, Russia also plans to develop a way to launch the Geran-5 from the air using Su-25 aircraft.

=== Geran-5 K5/K5-K ===
Ukrainian EOD specialist neutralizing the explosive remains of a "Geran-5 K5-K", Boryspil Raion, 1 November 2026

In late September 2026, it was reported through OSINT that Russia introduced a new variant of the Geran-5, designated as the Geran-5 K5. This new variant uses a redesigned fuselage and integrates an optical trajectory correction system. It was further noted that such upgrades bring the Geran-5 closer to a regular cruise missile in capabilities.

The new Geran-5 was further used in attacks in October and November 2026, with several wrecks identified. Although the new low-cost cruise missile/drone uses an entirely different airframe design, intelligence reports that it is still designated as a "Geran-5", with two variants identified as the "Geran-5 K5" and the V-tailed "Geran-5 K5-K".

Following the analysis of a recovered drone, HUR noted the Geran-5 K5-K variant, classified as a small-sized cruise missile, is smaller than the original Geran-5 at 4 m (13 ft) in length and a wingspan of 3 m (9.8 ft). It uses the TRD-200 turbojet engine, produced at Alabuga using Chinese parts, and can maintain a cruise speed of over 450 km/h (280 mph) while being able to reach a maximum speed of 1,000 km/h (620 mph). The warhead weight remained the same at 90 kg (200 lb), and the examined example featured a TBBC-90 thermobaric warhead. Compared to the original variant, the K5-K has a maximum range of 1,000 km (620 mi) and can reach an altitude of 6,000 m (20,000 ft).

The avionics of the K5-K variant are similar with those found on the Geran-4 Seeker variant, featuring a SADRA Seeker inertial navigation system, and a 16-element interference-resistant navigation system. The missile also features a Susanin electro-optical system using a Chinese Coke Pi microcomputer, and a "Borshch tracker" which uses a Raspberry Pi microcomputer. Most electronic components of the Geran-5 K5-K originate from the United States, China, and Switzerland.

=== Geran-6 ===
On 18 November 2026, Verkhovna Rada representative Fedir Venislavskyi revealed that Russia is testing a new Geran-6, capable of speeds up to "1,000 km/h" according to the data gathered by Ukrainian intelligence. According to Venislavskyi, such "drone-missiles" are difficult to shoot down even with jet-powered interceptors. Surface-to-air and air-to-air missiles remain the most effective way to counter such targets.

== Service history ==
The first combat missions of the Geran-5 were carried out in January 2026. The same month, Ukraine managed to shoot two such drones down, allowing for their detailed analysis. According to an address by President Volodymyr Zelenskyy, by September 2026, Ukraine managed to shoot down only 57% of the jet-powered drones, as Ukraine's current drone defenses are not sufficient. To combat the Russian jet-powered drones, Ukraine is testing new types of interceptor drones which are confirmed to have shot down a small number of Geran-5s.

During the 2026 Moscow Victory Day Parade, Russia publicly unveiled the Geran-5 in a video presentation. At the beginning of October, Ukrainian aviation expert Anatolii Khrapchynskyi noted that Russia is attempting to increase the drone's speed, with recent photos and videos showing the drone with the engine integrated into the fuselage. On 16 October, it was reported that Geran-5 drones had reached speeds of 800 km/h (500 mph) while flying over northern Ukraine.
