= Yelabuga drone factory =

Russian combat drone manufactory

- Military production facility
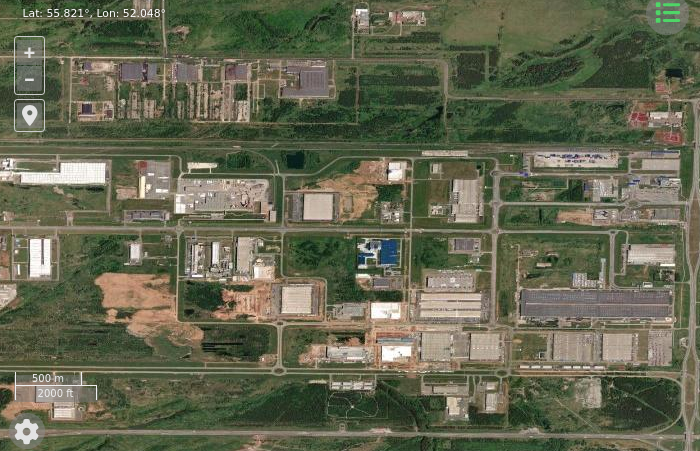
- Satellite imagery of the Yelabuga drone factory inside the Alabuga SEZ
- Owner: Russian Federation
- Location: Alabuga Special Economic Zone, Republic of Tatarstan, Russia
- Interactive map of Yelabuga drone factory
- Coordinates: 55°49′17.2″N 52°02′53.6″E

The Yelabuga drone factory (Russian: Елабужский завод беспилотников) is a Russian arsenal factory within the Alabuga Special Economic Zone in Tatarstan. Operated by the Russian company Albatross, the factory produces a large amount of Shahed-type (Geran) and other military drones used by Russia in Russo-Ukrainian war. It has been reported that the facility is largely staffed by students, including minors. The location of the factory allows for ease of transportation between Russia and Iran, with Iran being the source of many drones produced in Yelabuga. The factory, long short-staffed, has sought thousands of workers, mainly females and girls as young as 15 from Africa. In 2023, the factory's goal was to produce approximately 10,000 Shahed-type drones per year. The factory also produces reconnaissance drones, with the facility operating 24 hours a day. Based on Ukrainian Air Force data analyzed by Agence France-Presse, Russia fired 5,438 long‑range drones in June 2025, which equals an average of ~181 drones per day.

== Overview ==
The manufacturing plant develops Shahed-style loitering munitions and "Albatross" reconnaissance drones. It is located in the Alabuga Special Economic Zone, near Yelabuga, Republic of Tatarstan, Russia, more than 1,300km from the Ukraine-Russia border. Within the Special Economic Zone, the drones are reportedly referred to as "boats" (Russian: лодки). "Big boat" refers to the Shahed-136, called the "Geran-2" in Russian service, while "small boat" refers to the Shahed 131, called the "Geran-1" in Russian service. The project as a whole has been called "Project Boat." Other code words used by engineers include "bumpers" to refer to explosive payloads, and "Ireland" or "Belarus" to refer to Iran. The agreement between Iran and Russia has been described as a franchise by The Washington Post, in which Iran shares project documentation, locally produced or reverse-engineered components, and technical knowledge.

The facility was built near the Kama River, allowing direct transportation via ship directly from Iran through the Caspian Sea. The plant was built with materials provided by Iran. The plant is operated by Albatross, a Russian company that previously made agricultural technologies, and now produces drones for use in the Russian invasion of Ukraine. Albatross has developed long-range reconnaissance drones for use in the war, called "Albatross" or "Albatros M5" drones. Before and during the plant's development, Iran supplied loitering munitions for Russia to use in the invasion of Ukraine. The factory opened in July 2023.

Russia initially intended to build 6,000 drones by summer 2025 at a rate of 310 drones per month, operating the factory 24 hours a day. Following that, Russia planned to produce an additional 6,000 Shahed attack drones per year, in addition to surveillance drones. It predicted the cost of production of one Geran-2 would be US$48,000, or 25% of the cost to purchase. By April 2024, Western sources reported the plant had already produced 4,500 Shahed drones, and that, due to upgrades, the cost of production per unit has increased to around US$80,000. Russian soldiers were trained to operate the drones in Syria by the Islamic Revolutionary Guard Corps and the Iran-backed militant group Hezbollah, each designated terrorist organizations by several nations. (Note: Further information and sources can be found in List of designated terrorist groups § Islamic Revolutionary Guards Corps and Hezbollah foreign relations § Designation as a terrorist organization.)

== Employment ==
Leaked documents showed Alabuga has struggled to staff the factory. The initial plan included hosting 810 staff members working in three shifts to operate the manufactory 24 hours a day. However, the staff lacked expertise in various aspects of drone development. Consequently, numerous employees, including managers, engineers, students, and manual labourers, have travelled to Iranian drone manufactories for training. By the end of spring 2023, 200 employees and 100 students had been trained at Iranian centres.

In an effort to recruit girls and women ages 16 to 22, Alabuga advertised subsidized housing and a wage starting at $550 a month. Due to employee discomfort in building weapons for the Russian invasion of Ukraine, Alabuga has since increased salaries. Some employees working at the drone manufactory earn ten times the median Russian wage. Management have also seized passports to prevent people from quitting.

In July 2023, an investigation revealed the factory employs students as young as 15 of Alabuga Polytech, a branch of the Yelabuga Polytechnic College. As of August 2023, the factory had several hundred students employed. The students were promised a job and a locally competitive salary of up to 70,000 rubles (US$700) per month for a work experience program. Instead, students enrolled were forced into working at the drone facility, where their salaries are contingent on meeting production quotas, sometimes working 15 hours shifts without overtime pay, and "often without proper breaks or meals, and under hostile conditions that have deeply affected their mental health." School staff instructed students not to tell their parents about the drone assembly work, or they would be fined 1.5 million to 2 million rubles, per their employment contract with Alabuga Polytech.

Russian businessmen have been advertising and recruiting in Africa for the drone factory, specifically targeting girls and women. The Wall Street Journal reported one event in which the businessmen rented a hall at a school in Kampala, the capital of Uganda, to pitch employment opportunities to young female students. The pitch advertised a work-study program for skilled labour, offering a wage triple what the women would earn in Uganda, free accommodations, and a university diploma. The Wall Street Journal also reported the tone and message of the work-study pitches were intended to be anti-colonial, "echoing some of the language of the Cold War and reflecting Russia’s attempts to use soft power to dilute Western influence in East Africa." According to Ugandan officials, over 1,000 women from across Africa have gone to the Special Economic Zone, predicting a further 1,000 would join in 2024.

== Drone development ==
Starting in January 2023, the plan for the drone factory was to implement production in three phases: The first phase was to reassemble (as knock-down kits) 100 drones per month, imported from Iran. The second phase would include the drone factory producing its own airframes (the drones' hollow bodies). The third phase would include producing another 4,000 drones by September 2025 with little assistance from Iran.

During the first phase, Russia reported that around 25% of drones shipped from Iran were damaged or inoperable.

=== Iranian Shahed-136 ===
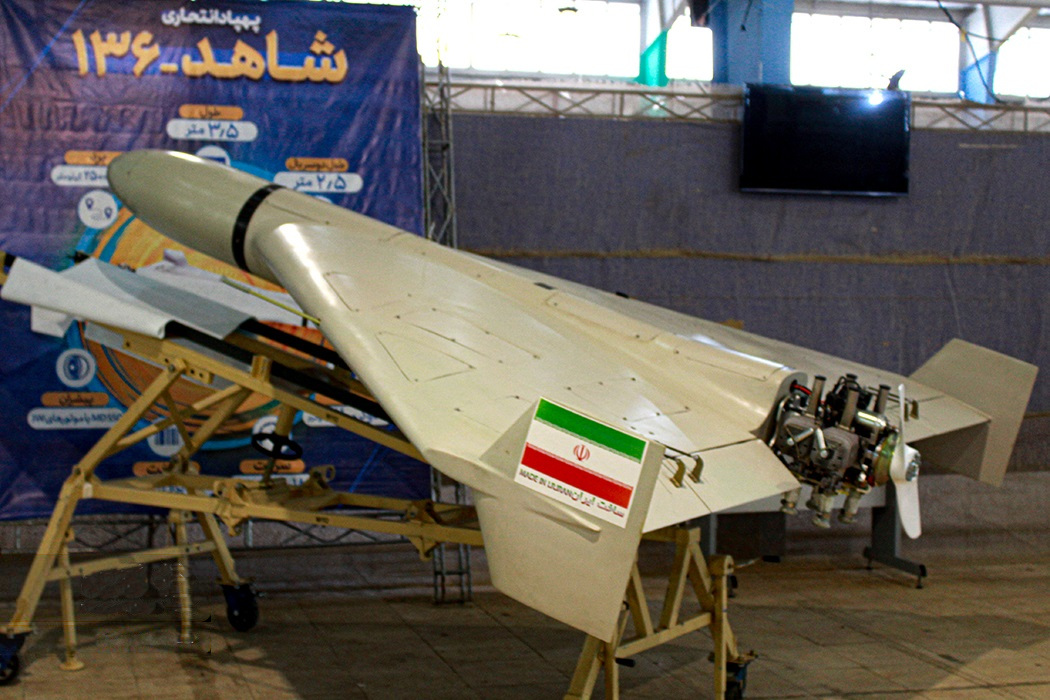
A Shahed-136 at an exhibition, September 2023

Leaked data provided by Iran to Russia indicated that 90% of an Iranian Shahed-136's computer chips and electrical components are manufactured in the West, primarily in the United States. The components are sold as civilian products. The American companies that produce these components include Texas Instruments, Analog Devices, and Xilinx, a company acquired in 2022 by AMD. Without further elaboration, a leaked document listed supplies available in Russia and indicated that Mouser and DigiKey could be potential suppliers for components.

The Shahed-136 is powered by a Mado MD550 engine made by Mado, based on a German Limbach Flugmotoren L550E engine illicitly obtained by Iran. An investigation submitted by Ukraine to the G7 in September 2023 revealed Shahed drones are built with commercially available parts sold by companies headquartered in the United States, Switzerland, the Netherlands, Germany, Canada, Japan, and Poland. The document suggested there is no deliberate wrongdoing on the part of the companies, and that, due to the commercial availability of the parts, the parts are simply poorly regulated or are uncontrolled. The document also reported the components are imported to Iran from Turkey, India, Kazakhstan, Uzbekistan, Vietnam and Costa Rica.

=== Russian Geran-2 ===
Geran-2 drone displayed by the Defense Intelligence of Ukraine in 2026

In July 2023, Albatross's co-founder, Ilya Voronkov, said in interviews that 70% of its drones' components are made in Russia, while other parts such as the engine are from China. Albatross's website advertises cameras, electronics, and other equipment from European, American, and Asian companies. American officials later reported China had supplied Russia with military hardware in addition to optics, microelectronics and other dual-use materials that could be used in drones. Ukraine reported that Russia sourced engines for their attack drones from the Chinese company called Beijing MicroPilot UAV Flight Control Systems. Other supplies are provided by Iranian front companies often based in places like Hong Kong or Dubai.

The airframe is constructed from materials provided by Russian and Belarusian companies. A sample of a material used to make the wings was provided by the Chinese company Metastar to the drone manufactory. Since production has commenced at the drone factory in Yelabuga, Russian engineers have replaced both glue and Chinese electronics deemed inadequate, and have waterproofed and redesigned the airframe. Russia has also begun producing its own warheads. Further improvements include an effort to make the Geran-2s capable of swarm strikes, in which the drones autonomously coordinate an attack on a target.

As of late spring 2025 Russia has been producing around 170 Geran-2 drones per day, with indication that a total of around 26,000 Gerans were produced by Yelabuga drone factory.

In early 2026 Sysrky has claimed that Russia was producing 404 "Shaheds" of different types each day, though it is unclear if the number includes other Shahed-like drones like Garpiya and Gerbera.

In October 2026, it was estimated by the CSIS, that the facility could potentially be producing more than 3,000 propeller-powered Geran drones and 3,500 jet-powered Geran-4 and 5 drones (or over 78,000 per year). This is not a verified production number, but an estimate of production capacity. Direct and extensive Chinese assistance at the facilities was reported.

== History ==
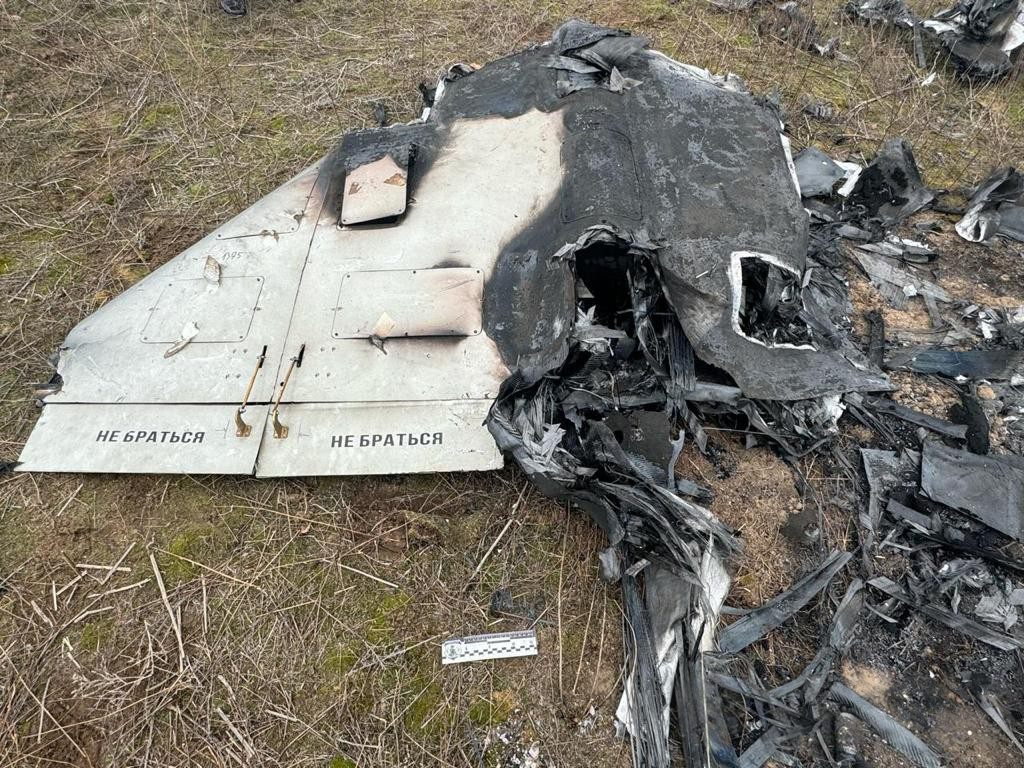
A downed Geran-2 in Ukraine, February 2024

Shahed drones were previously built by Shahed Aviation Industries in Iran, where, allegedly, every drone manufactory has two backup sites in the event of an aerial attack at one site.

In December 2022, the Biden administration publicly accused Iran and Russia of moving to cooperate in the construction of a drone manufacturing plant in Russia. In June 2023, the White House released a U.S. intelligence report revealing Iran was supplying Russia with materials to construct the drone manufactory, predicting it would be fully operational by early 2024. Photo and video evidence from Russian social media indicated Albatross commenced some reconnaissance drone production in January 2023.

In September 2023, during the seventy-eighth session of the United Nations General Assembly, the United States directly accused Iran of both supplying Russia with drones during the invasion of Ukraine, and of assisting Russia with the development of a drone manufacturing plant. Despite mounting evidence, president of Iran Ebrahim Raisi denied sending drones for use in the invasion, responding, "We are against the war in Ukraine." Iran had also said it provided drones to Russia only before the start of the war. Russia has also dismissed reports of it working with Iran, saying Russia relies on its own research and development. The Ukrainian report to G7, submitted in August 2023, further detailed the Iranian government was trying to "disassociate itself from providing Russia with weapons" and that "[Iran] cannot cope with Russian demand and the intensity of use in Ukraine." US officials determined that Iran continues to supply the Russian military with suicide drones, having shipped hundreds by May 2023, shipping them from the Amirabad Special Economic Zone and Port, Iran to Makhachkala, Russia.

On 2 April 2024, the drone factory was struck by an improvised drone apparently adapted from a civilian light aircraft, likely an Aeroprakt A-22. Ukraine's military intelligence claimed the strike "caused significant destruction of production facilities." Local governor Rustam Minnikhanov said the attack brought no serious damage or disruption to production. Russian media reported a nearby workers' dormitory was damaged, with 12 injured.

By December 2024 satellite imagery showed how the production facilities had been expanded significantly.

On 15 June 2025 Ukrainian drones again attacked the factory. All drones were reportedly shot down, with their debris causing a fire either in the drone factory or according to the regional governor in a nearby automobile factory. According to the governor, the attack caused one fatality and thirteen injuries.

As of June 2025, North Korea reportedly has been sending tens of thousands of workers to Russia to help produce attack drones.

In August 2025, it was reported that defensive towers topped with Pantsir anti-aircraft systems had been erected around the facility. In October 2026, Radio Liberty analyzed open source satellite images which showed there were now 33 air defence positions surrounding the drone production complex. There is a mixture of concrete towers and elevated earthen embankments for use by Pantsir and Tor short range air defence systems. There are also smaller towers equipped with anti-aircraft heavy machine guns within the grounds of the facility, as well as extensive anti-drone netting.

== See also ==
- Iranian involvement in the Russo-Ukrainian war (2022–present)
- Geran (weapons family)
