= Middle strike campaign =

Ukrainian drone campaign targeting Russian military supply trucks

- Part of Russo-Ukrainian War
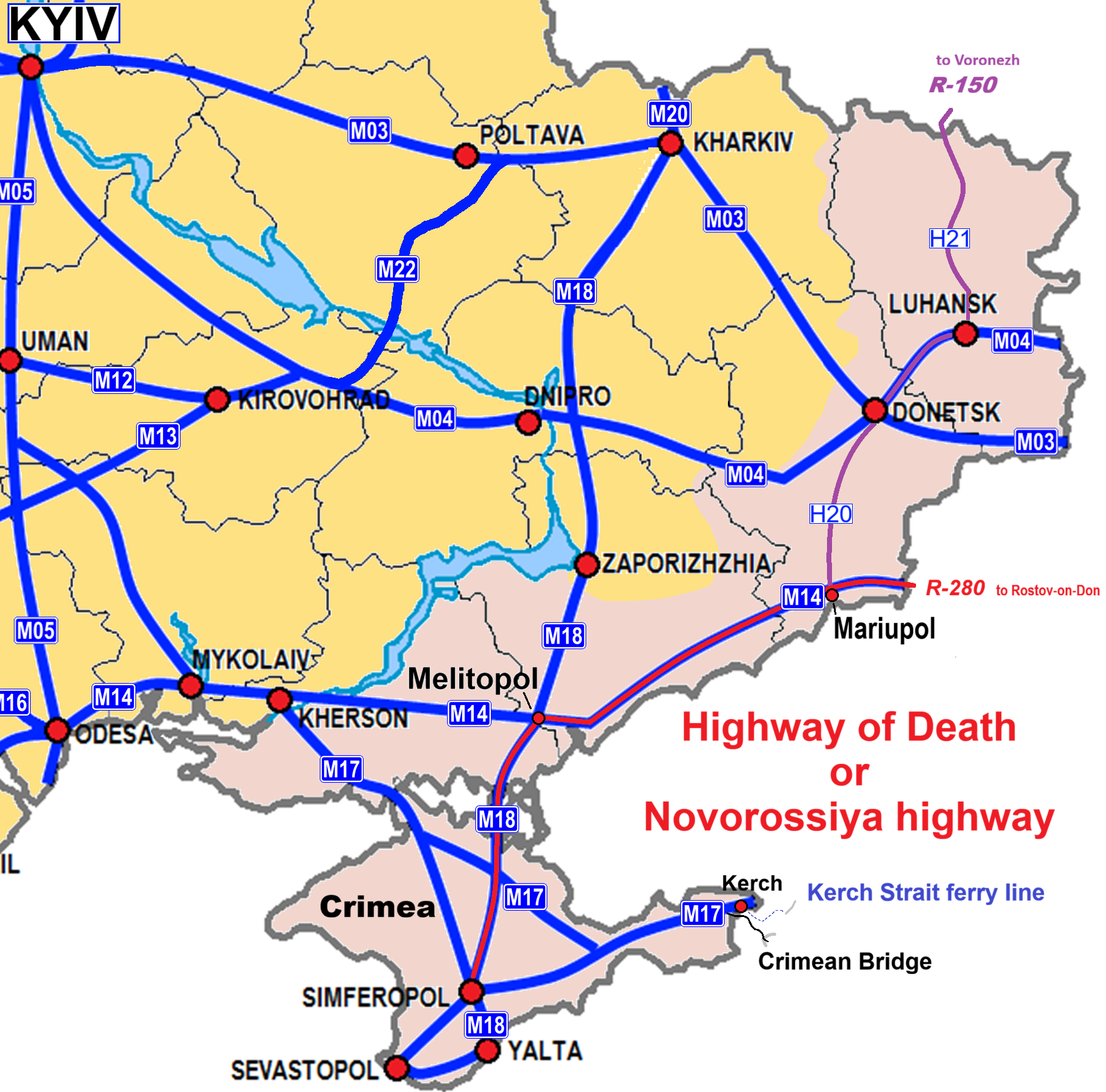
- Roads in Ukraine targeted by the middle strike campaign Extended R-280: the Highway of Death, or Novorossiya highway. It is also labelled as part of M14 and M18. Extended R-150. It is also labelled as part of H21, M04, and H20.
Location	Russian targets within c. 25–200 km of Ukrainian-controlled territory

Belligerents
Ukraine	Russia

Commanders and leaders
Robert Brovdi	

The middle strike campaign, (Note: Also called "mid-range strike campaign" or "intermediate-range strike campaign".) launched by the Unmanned Systems Forces of Ukraine in early April 2026 during the Russo-Ukrainian war, has been aiming to achieve a "logistics breakdown" for Russia in the Russian-occupied territories of Ukraine, especially Crimea. The primary targets of the middle strike campaign, characterised by the rapid technological advancements and effectiveness of Ukraine's one-way attack drones, have been Russia's military supply trucks driving on the highway on the land corridor between Rostov-on-Don and Simferopol and Sevastopol in Crimea, which became known as the Highway of Death (Note: Ukrainian: шосе смерті, romanized: Shose smerti.) or the Novorossiya highway. (Note: Russian: автодорога «Новороссия», romanized: avtodoroga "Novorossiya" or Russian: трасса «Новороссия», romanized: trassa "Novorossiya".)

This 700-kilometre motorway on the northern coast of the Sea of Azov in the Russian-occupied territories of Ukraine has been playing an important role in the 2022 Russian invasion of Ukraine as ground line of communication (GLOC) for Russia's military logistics, particularly for supplying Crimea. It is a combination of two stretches from the existing Highway M14 of Ukraine (part of European route E58) from the Russo-Ukrainian border via Mariupol until Melitopol, and from there the existing Highway M18 of Ukraine (part of European route E105) to Simferopol. At the Russo-Ukrainian border, Highway M14 connects with Russian federal highway R-280 (or R280) via Taganrog to Rostov-on-Don. The pair of two highway stretches was dubbed the "Novorossiya highway" by Russia in the mid-2020s, and formally added to the existing R-280, a move rejected by Ukraine.

A similar situation exists for the Russian-designated highway R-150, which is a connected combination of stretches of Highway H20 of Ukraine from Mariupol to Donetsk city, Highway M04 of Ukraine between Donetsk and Luhansk city, and Highway H21 of Ukraine from Luhansk city via Starobilsk to the Russo-Ukrainian border.

On 9 June 2026, commander Robert "Madyar" Brovdi of the 414th Unmanned Strike Aviation Brigade ("Birds of Madyar") reported that because of the middle strike campaign, Russian military cargo traffic along the highway of death had fallen by 71% during the previous two weeks. This soon resulted in severe fuel shortages, as well as food and goods shortages, in Crimea and other occupied regions in southeastern Ukraine.

== Background ==
The Novorossiya highway became crucial in supplying Crimea over the "land bridge" through occupied southern Donetsk, Zaporizhzhia and Kherson oblasts instead of the Crimean Bridge (Kerch Bridge), that was severely damaged in 2025 and remains vulnerable.

"Russia heavily relies on road-borne logistics transiting the Novorossiya highway to supply fuel and military materiel to sustain its occupation of Crimea, as well as to supply Russian troops occupying parts of Kherson and Zaporizhzhia oblasts. Indeed, the creation of a "land bridge" to Crimea was a key Russian war objective."

— The Kyiv Independent
(25 June 2026)

Since then, the Bridge has been closed off for heavy vehicles, meaning the only remaining ways for supplying Crimea are via air (but mutual air denial has practically eliminated this option since the start of the full-scale invasion in February 2022), the Kerch Strait ferry line, and the M14 and M18 highways over the land bridge. However, the ferry line has a limited capacity, and the highway has come under the fire control of the Ukrainian military around early 2026, particularly with the rapidly advancing developments in drone warfare technology.

Before the launch of the middle strike campaign in early April 2026, Ukrainian mid-range drones, aimed at striking "Russian targets at operational depth behind the front — typically defined as between 25–200 km (16–124 mi) from the front lines" — had been in routine use for well over a year. However, the targets had until that time been predominantly air defence systems, command centers, and ammunition dumps (some of which were moved back into Russia after successful Ukrainian attacks on Russian air defence systems, radars, and command, supply and ammo depots on occupied Ukrainian territory).

The middle strike campaign changed the focus to destroying Russian supply trucks and disrupting logistics instead.

== Middle strike campaign ==
=== Objectives and preparations ===
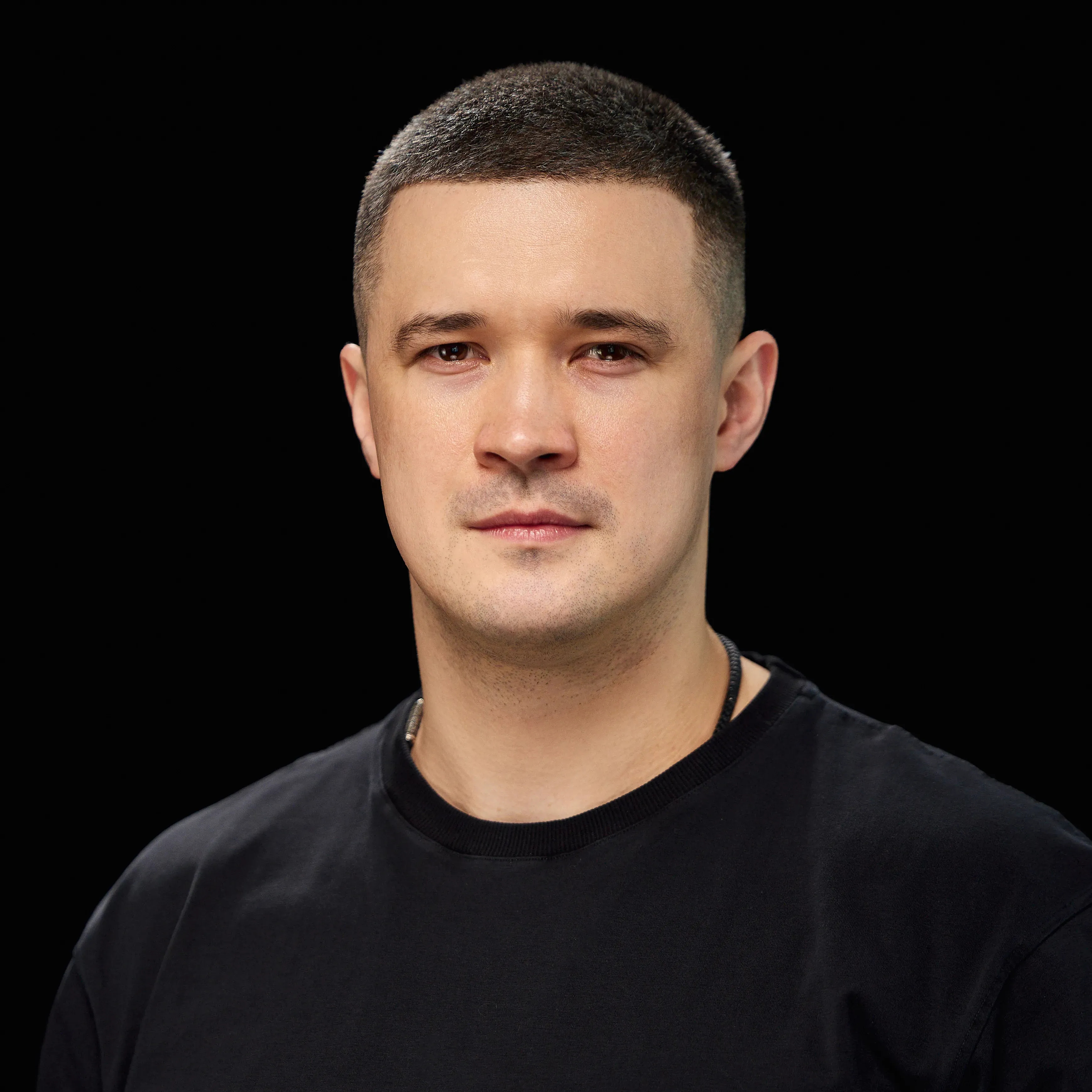
Mykhailo Fedorov, Minister of Defence of Ukraine from January 2026 until his controversial dismissal in July

As set out by Mykhailo Fedorov, the Minister of Defence of Ukraine, the targeting of the R-280 highway since mid-April 2026 was designed to achieve a "logistics breakdown" (or "logistics lockdown") for Russia.

Unlike a year earlier, by mid-May 2026, Ukraine's rapidly expanded capacity to produce and deploy advanced drones enabled an unprecedented and sustained campaign to pressure and isolate Crimea. The low cost of Ukraine's latest drones, such as the Hornet and Dart, also financially defeated the much more expensive MANPAD missiles and about equally expensive proximity-fused shells for a heavy anti-aircraft gun that the Russian military tried to intercept them with. Ukrainian anti-bridge drones striking the Chonhar and Henichesk Bridges, such as the Behemoth, cost less than US$50,000, a fraction of a Storm Shadow/SCALP cruise missile at US$2,000,000 apiece that Ukraine used to take out the Chonhar Bridge in 2023.

On 27 May 2026, Fedorov announced an additional 5 billion Ukrainian hryvnia (US$113 million) in funding for the frontline units that had proven most effective in carrying out operations of the middle strike campaign.

On 22 June 2026, SBU major general Viktor Yahun told UNIAN that the campaign's objective was not (yet) a Ukrainian ground offensive to liberate Crimea, but to make maintaining the Russian military occupation of Crimea "as difficult and expensive as possible for the enemy". "That is why the key targets are not seaside resorts, nor even military bases. The targets are bridges, railway junctions, fuel depots and logistics centres." USF commander Robert "Madyar" Brovdi similarly told Reuters: "The aim is to deprive the Kremlin of the ability to use Crimea as a springboard for new offensive operations."

=== Initial observations ===
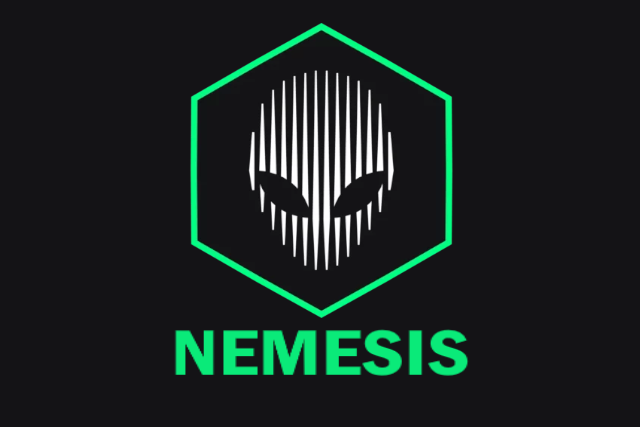
412th Unmanned Systems Brigade ("Nemesis")

By May 2026, Ukrainian drones had become highly effective at targeting and destroying Russian military supply trucks all over M14 and M18 highway stretches, earning it the nickname "Highway of Death", or "Highway to Hell". The motorway became a prime target for the 412th Unmanned Systems Brigade ("Nemesis") and other Ukrainian UAV units during the "middle strike campaign" of early 2026. Reportedly, the fixed-wing U.S.-made Hornet drones and Ukrainian-produced Morrigan drones have been significantly involved in striking Russian military trucks on the road.

On 25 May 2026, an Institute for the Study of War (ISW) report noted that "Ukraine significantly intensified its intermediate-range strike campaign against dynamic targets in Spring 2026 in order to degrade Russian logistics at operational depths ahead of a planned Ukrainian manoeuvre." Both Russian officials and milbloggers were confirming "in mid-to-late May 2026 that Ukrainian drones were increasingly targeting Russian vehicles and logistics … at distances over 160km from the frontline." By geolocation, the ISW was able to verify approximately 35 attacks on vehicles on the motorways M14 and M18, as well as the H20 between Mariupol and Donetsk, with circumstantial evidence suggesting the real number was much higher.

On 29 May, OSINT monitoring group Tochnyi managed to "geolocate 55 strikes on Russian logistics vehicles in April and 130 strikes in May, with the number increasing on a daily basis." A 31 May Kyiv Independent analysis of video footage of Hornet drones, released by the 1st Azov Corps alone (since mid-April), was able to confirm more than 50 strikes on key logistics corridors, including the R-280.

=== Formations involved ===
Unmanned Systems Forces of Ukraine

20th Unmanned Systems Brigade ("K-2")

According to a June 2026 article by the Kyiv Post, about 5,000-8,000 Ukrainian drone operators and maintainers were involved in the middle strike campaign, targeting the supply lines that about 250,000 to 300,000 "Russian ground forces occupying Ukraine's Donetsk, Zaporizhzhia, Kherson, and Crimea regions are dependent on." The Russian forces mostly fell under the command of the 5th and 8th Combined Arms Armies. Most Ukrainian USF forces consisted of 300 to 500 personnel, who would launch at most 30 to 40 one-way attack drones plus a smaller number of reconnaissance drones per strike package.

Ukrainian formations involved in the middle strike campaign:

- Unmanned Systems Forces of Ukraine (USF or SBS)
  - 1st Center of the Unmanned Systems Forces (for SEAD/DEAD)
  - 413th Regiment of Unmanned Systems ("Raid", split from the 1st USF Center in 2024, for Russian drone warehouses and SEAD/DEAD in Berdyansk and Mariupol)
  - 20th Unmanned Systems Brigade ("K-2", for anti-logistics operations in northern Crimea)
  - 412th Unmanned Systems Brigade ("Nemesis", for the R-280 highway)
  - 414th Unmanned Strike Aviation Brigade ('Birds of Madyar')
    - 2nd Battalion "Wormbusters" (for logistics hubs around Mariupol and freight vehicles along the H-20 Donetsk-Mariupol highway)
    - 9th Battalion "Kairos" (for SEAD/DEAD, supply trucks and trains, and oil depots)
  - 422nd Unmanned Systems Regiment (for fuel and freight trucks in southern Zaporizhzhia)
- Ukrainian Ground Forces
  - 1st Separate Assault Regiment
  - 475th Assault Regiment "Code 9.2" (for bridges and causeways)
- Ukrainian Military Intelligence (HUR) (for fuel tankers on the R-280 highway)
- National Guard of Ukraine
  - Pilum Regiment of the 1st Corps of the Ukrainian National Guard "Azov"

=== Drone types involved ===
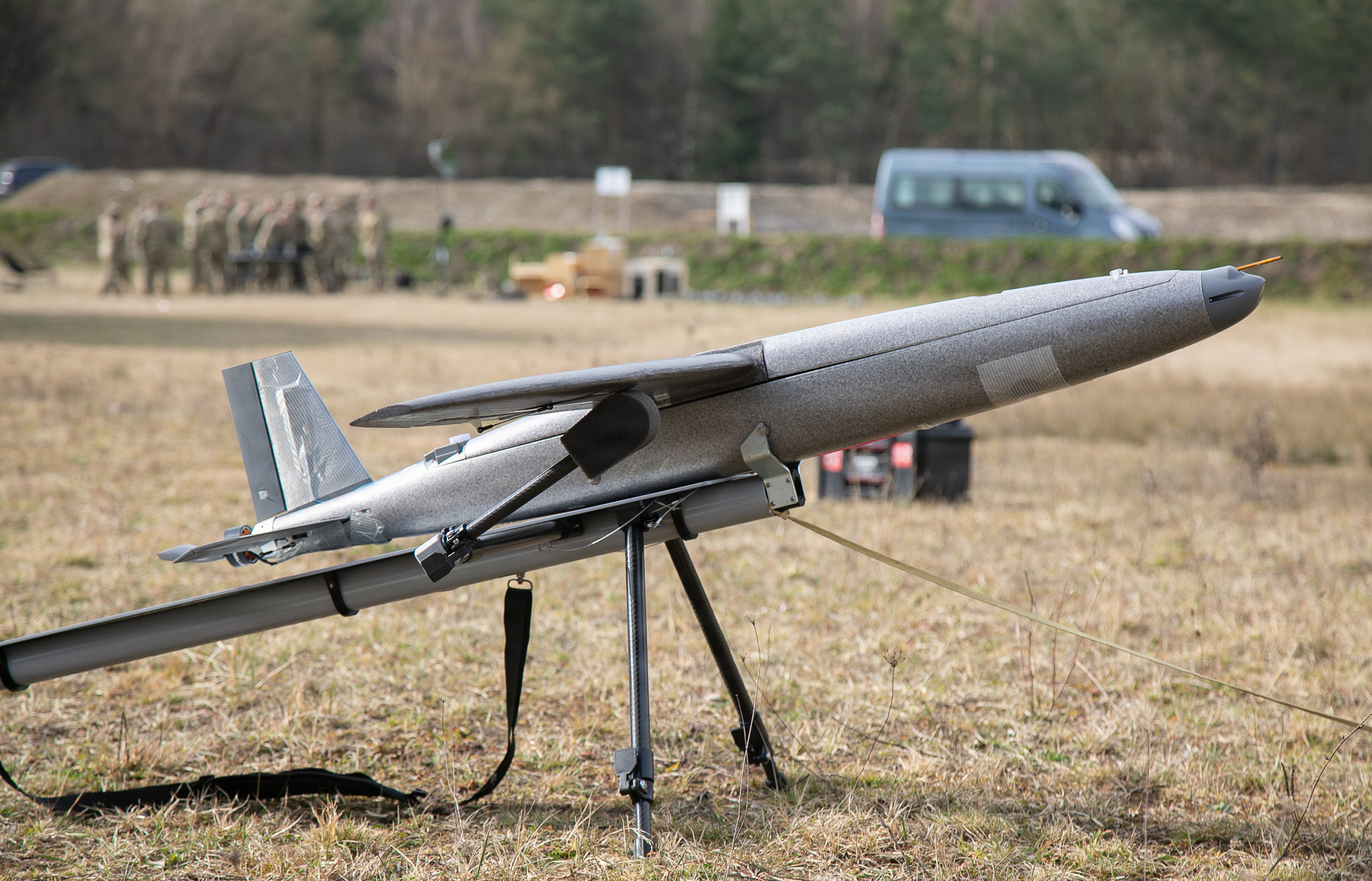
A Hornet drone at the Grafenwoehr Training Area in March 2026

Ukrainian drones (mostly one-way attack drones, including loitering munitions) frequently used in the middle strike campaign:

- Morrigan:
  - 2 metre-long lightweight fixed-wing drone, operated by the 412th Unmanned Systems Brigade ("Nemesis")
- Dart 250:
  - c. US$2,000
- Hornet:
  - 5 kilogram warhead, range of 150 or up to 200 kilometres, cost (up to) c. US$5,000, operated by the Pilum Regiment of the 1st Azov Corps
- Behemoth:
  - heavy, anti-bridge warhead, less than US$50,000, operated by the 475th Assault Regiment "Code 9.2"
- FP-2:
  - heavy, anti-bridge warhead, operated by the 475th Assault Regiment "Code 9.2"

=== Escalation ===
On 19 June 2026, French OSINT statistical analyst Clément Molin noted an intensification of Ukraine's medium-range strike campaign, reaching a rate of 30 struck targets a day on Russian supply lines in occupied Crimea and southern Ukraine. For 22 June, Molin counted 47 successful drone attacks, and for 22 June 56 successful strikes. From 19 to 23 June, the total of Russian trucks and other pieces of military equipment (including bridges, crossings, trains and railways) on the highways was counted as 193, with the total number of such targets successfully attacked since early May 2026 estimated at nearly 800. Molin attributed this to the increasing effectiveness, availability, deployment of Ukrainian drones on the one hand, versus the "typically sluggish response" of the Russian military, a shortage of classic short-range air defence systems within the Russian military to equip mobile anti-air defence teams to protect the supply lines (only on key roads, not detours), and the effectiveness of Russia's radars and electronic warfare systems being undermined due to systematic Ukrainian targeting. The Russian mobile anti-air defence teams assigned to protect the supply lines have themselves become the target of Ukrainian drone strikes, and have much more frequently been observed to flee, or forced to abandon their positions, rather than successfully counter-attacking and shooting down incoming Ukrainian drones.

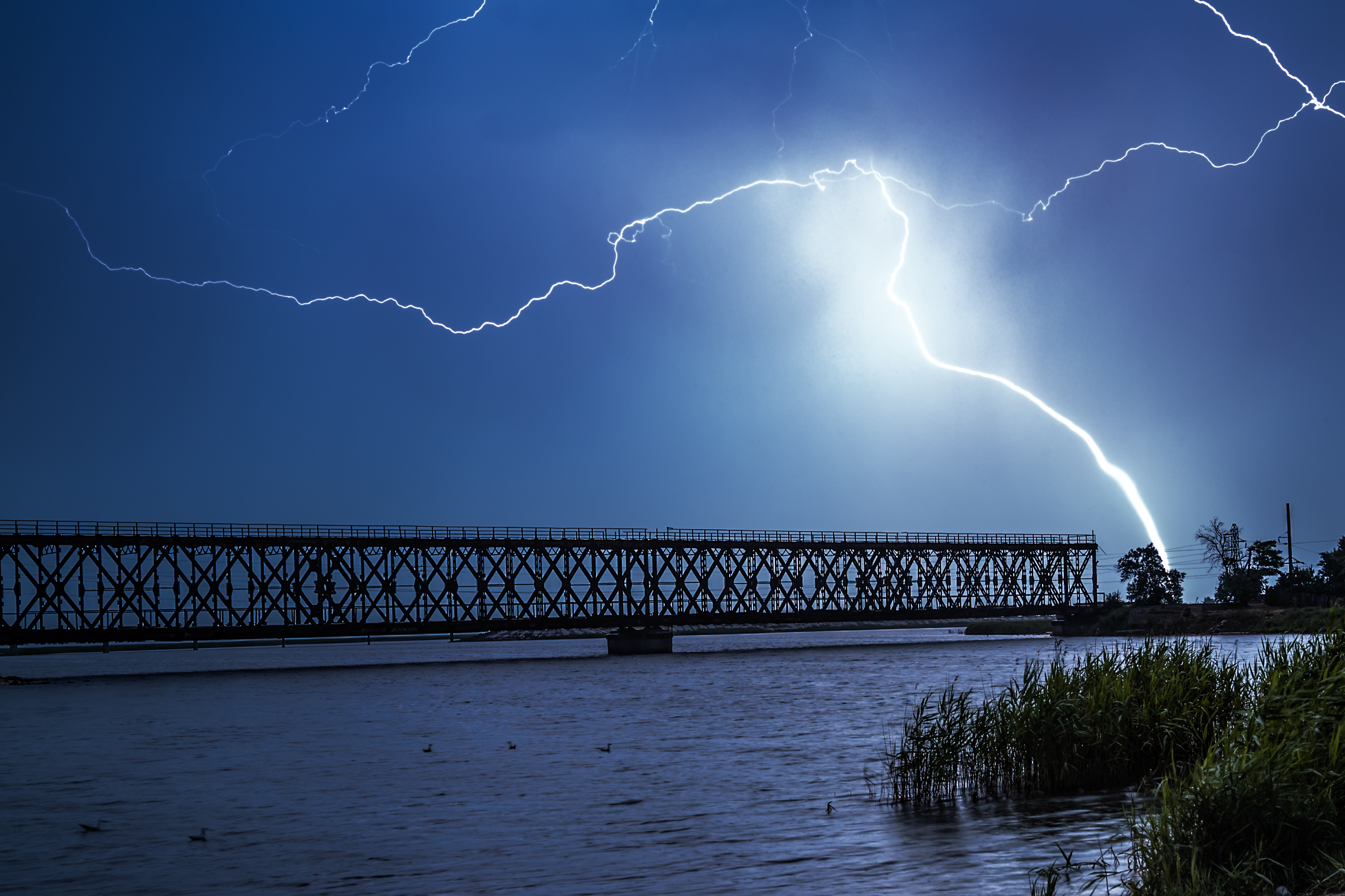
Henichesk Iron Bridge, June 2021

The 22 June 2026 ISW report noted that Molin verified footage confirming at least 500 Russian trucks and vehicles in occupied Ukraine hit by Ukrainian attacks between 1 May and 18 June 2026, and that 270 of such attacks had been confirmed using geolocation since January 2026, most of them between 1 May and 18 June 2026. It also invoked Meduza's observation that Ukrainian forces shifted focus from "heavily targeting sections of the M-14 Rostov-Crimea highway in southwestern Donetsk Oblast and eastern Zaporizhia Oblast" in May "westward toward occupied Kherson Oblast and occupied Crimea" in June. The ISW observed geolocated evidence of at least 210 Ukrainian intermediate-range strikes in occupied Ukraine in all of May, versus 145 from 1 to 22 June, noting that some intermediate-range strikes were now being redirected to Russian rear areas in the Pokrovsk, Kostiantynivka, and Sloviansk directions. Apart from the Kerch Bridge in the east, at least ten Ukrainian attacks were carried out against seven other bridges connecting Crimea to mainland Ukraine in the north in a single week in mid-June 2026.

On 2 July 2026, Foreign Policy painted a grim picture of Russian losses on the Highway of Death due to Ukraine's ongoing middle strike campaign:

Hundreds of burned-out and charred wrecks of tractor trailers, tanker trucks, and assorted military transports line the shoulders of Russia’s chief supply route to Crimea and occupied southern Ukraine from Russia proper. Mile after mile of vehicle carcasses lie overturned and jackknifed in roadside ditches, supply transports that never reached their destination. This 390-mile stretch—the most direct route from the Russian supply hub of Rostov-on-Don to the Black Sea region—has earned itself the moniker “Highway of Death,” assigned to it by Ukrainian and Russian soldiers.

=== November 2026 destruction of the Crimean Road Bridge ===
Beginning on 16 November 2026, as part of the Russo-Ukrainian war, Ukrainian forces have repeatedly targeted the Crimean Bridge with missiles and drones, causing severe damage to the bridge and the destruction of the main span of its road bridge, as well as repeatedly stopping traffic across the bridge.

The first attack, on 16 November 2026, caused one of the road bridge's structural arches to shift by about 15 degrees according to Russian media, forcing the partial closure of road traffic over the bridge. The second attack, on 17 November, collapsed the arch structure and main span of the road bridge below it. Both train and vehicle traffic on the bridge were suspended, with train traffic resuming later that day. A third attack, on the rail bridge, occurred on 19 November.

== Effects and responses ==
=== Military logistics disruptions and restrictions on civilian traffic ===
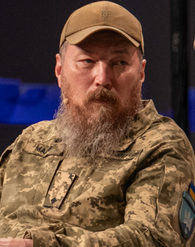
Robert "Madyar" Brovdi in July 2025

As a result of the strikes, in late May 2026, Russian occupying authorities almost completely closed off the road to all civilian traffic. The Russian-appointed governor of Kherson Oblast, Vladimir Saldo, restricted civilian truck movements on the R-280 on 21 May. In early June 2026, the Chonhar Bridge across the Syvash on the M18 was heavily damaged by Ukrainian drone strikes, prompting the Russian military to close that fixed link off as well. In its stead, on 7 June, Russia reopened the pontoon bridge near the damaged bridge, first laid in 2023 when the Chonhar Bridge was hit by a Storm Shadow missile; after it was repaired, the pontoon bridge had not been used in three years. Similarly on 6 June 2026, the Russian-appointed governor of Luhansk Oblast also restricted passenger and commercial traffic on highway R-150 through Luhansk to Mariupol.

On 9 June 2026, commander Robert "Madyar" Brovdi of the 414th Unmanned Strike Aviation Brigade ("Birds of Madyar") reported that Russian military cargo traffic along the highway of death had fallen by 71% during the previous two weeks.

On 15 June 2026, Petro Andriushchenko of the Centre for the Study of Occupation stated that civilian fuel truck drivers in early June were offered 100,000 rubles per return trip to Crimea by the Russian government, but 1.5 weeks later, the government had already increased the offer per return trip to 300,000 rubles (c. 150,000 Ukrainian hryvnia, or c. 3,000 euro). As nobody could guarantee their safety, many civilian fuel truck drivers refused nonetheless. Only some civilians driving small fuel trucks disguised as other cargo, or lorries transporting cargo other than fuel, remained willing to drive to Crimea over the Highway of Death. In addition, repair tractor drivers refused to work on damaged roads on the bypass around Mariupol, even when offered increased salaries, because they were afraid of getting hit by drones. Andriushchenko closed by saying: "Probably, soon no one will be there to transport fuel, repair roads, and so on."

=== Initial fuel shortages ===
The middle strike campaign caused significant shortages of commodities, most notably fuel supplies, in Crimea and parts of occupied mainland Ukraine. In late May, the emerging fuel crisis already caused inhabitants of occupied Melitopol in southern Kherson Oblast and Mariupol in southern Donetsk Oblast to post footage on social media of soaring fuel prices and long queues at filling stations. By late May, the Russian-appointed governor of Sevastopol reported that filling stations in the city were running out of petrol, with diesel only occasionally available. Before fuel sales were rationed by coupons, the price of petrol in Sevastopol had reportedly risen by 50% compared to the average price in Russia. Fuel rations were first introduced in Crimea on 30–31 May. By early June, residents of occupied Crimea complained of kilometre-long queues at petrol stations, where authorities have introduced coupons limiting the sale of gasoline to 20 litres per person. Public transportation across Crimea was reduced in order to save fuel.

=== Certain food shortages ===
As early as 8 June 2026, the National Resistance Center of Ukraine claimed that residents of Crimea were also reporting shortages of specific food products, including sugar, salt, pasta, grains, and flour, due to supply chain disruptions caused by the Ukrainian drone strikes on Russian logistics routes. Petro Andriushchenko, head of the Center for the Study of Occupation, observed: "Following a series of strikes on the R-280 Novorossiya motorway and the logistics infrastructure of the land corridor to Crimea, fuel shortages began to gradually give way to supply shortages of certain goods."

Some retailers began restricting product sales to individual customers. The Telegram channel Crimean Wind (Krimsky Viter) reported on 8 June that Crimea's PUD retail chain had introduced restrictions on the sale products such as butter, pasta, grains, flour, and water. One Dobrostroy shop in occupied Crimea may have begun limiting customers to three bottles of vegetable oil and three packets of pasta as early as 6 June. These measures heightened fears amongst the population.

Some specific food shortages may have been the result of panic-buying (or hoarding) rather than supply chain disruptions, as sugar was reportedly sold out across multiple shops in Sevastopol around 23 June.

=== Severe fuel shortages and sale bans ===
"Hell is beginning. Logistics are being cut off. Crimea is being isolated."

— Mykhailo Fedorov
(Minister of Defence of Ukraine, 17 June 2026)

In subsequent weeks, more videos appeared of burnt-out Russian supply trucks and tankers that journalists managed to geolocate to the highway between Melitopol and Crimea. One Russian military blogger acknowledged that "Petrol tankers and lorries are regularly set alight" by Ukrainian drones attacking the land corridor; "One by one, the links connecting the peninsula to the mainland are being severed." A Kyiv Post review of battle video footage, unit statements and open source reports concluded that from 1 to 18 June alone, "hundreds of fuel trucks" driving on occupied territory had been destroyed by Ukrainian mid-range drones.

On 21 June, the oil terminals in the Port of Kerch and Port Kavkaz were heavily damaged by Ukrainian drones, as were the remaining large road ferries on the Kerch Strait, all three of which caught fire and were subsequently put out of service by the occupation authorities. In addition, Ukrainian forces struck Russian radar systems near Kurortne and west of Kerch. The situation became so dire that the Russian-appointed government of Crimea banned all fuel usage by ordinary citizens and business, restricting availability only to government agencies. Also on 21 June, the Kremlin-appointed governor of Sevastopol decreed that public transport, shops, supermarkets, restaurants, bars, and cafes in the city were allowed to operate only by day, and had to close at 8 p.m., while street lights were turned off at night to save power, and thus fuel.

Summer camps for children had also been cancelled across Crimea from late June until 1 September 2026 by order of Sergey Aksyonov. Almost 400 planned children's holiday camps throughout Crimea were thus cancelled, along with other major events. Some trains bringing Russian children to Artek summer camp in Gurzuf were stopped mid-way, with one passenger reporting that the "Artek" kids seemed to have been pulled off the train in a hurry, "[leaving] all their food and snacks behind." Another Ukrainian drone strike on the Crimean Bridge on 22 June 2026 damaged it, further disrupting traffic and logistics across that route.

"At the moment, Ukraine's Armed Forces are regulating fuel supplies to Crimea."

— Oleg Kryuchkov
(Advisor to the Head of the Republic of Crimea, 23 June 2026)

On 23 June, the Crimean occupation authorities' spokesperson Oleg Kryuchkov stated: "There is still no real breakthrough that would allow us to say that petrol will be available at filling stations next week. The situation is quite difficult. A decision has now been made to supply fuel only to emergency services and services responsible for essential functions, including food distribution groups." Due to the fuel shortage, each ministry only had one service vehicle at its disposal "for the prompt resolution of urgent tasks". "At the moment, Ukraine's Armed Forces are regulating fuel supplies to Crimea," Kryuchkov said. Around the same time, reports surfaced of power outages in several urban centres in Crimea (including for backup generators), along with increasing fuel shortages and residents resorting to cycling whenever possible to avoid having to use their cars. Also on 23 June, Russian deputy prime minister Alexander Novak stated that the Russian federal government was considering a "total ban" on exports of diesel, after previously halting exports of petrol and jet fuel. These measures were not just in response to the Crimean situation, but the wider Russian fuel crisis due to Ukrainian long-range strikes against oil refineries, including in Tuapse (16 April 2026) and Perm (26 April).

Logistical problems in the occupied Donetsk and Luhansk oblasts were exacerbated by the Ukrainine middle strike campaign on the M14, the extended "R-150" from Russia to Luhansk, Donetsk and Mariupol, and other critical transport links. Ever since a pipeline carrying drinking water from the river Donets to the city of Donetsk was destroyed during the 2022 Russian Donbas offensive, the city had faced water shortages, which worsened when water supply trucks on the highway were increasingly taken out by Ukrainian drone strikes in May and June 2026. A Donetsk city resident told BBC News in late June 2026: "People are just getting by... water comes once every three days. There's very little petrol, and it's the most expensive in the country. Drinking water has to be bought." There were very few cars on the streets anymore, and "everyone who could and did want to leave has already done so". He added that prices were rising, the range of available goods was shrinking, and that elderly people, children and people living in refugee centres were becoming particularly vulnerable.

=== Power outages and restrictions ===
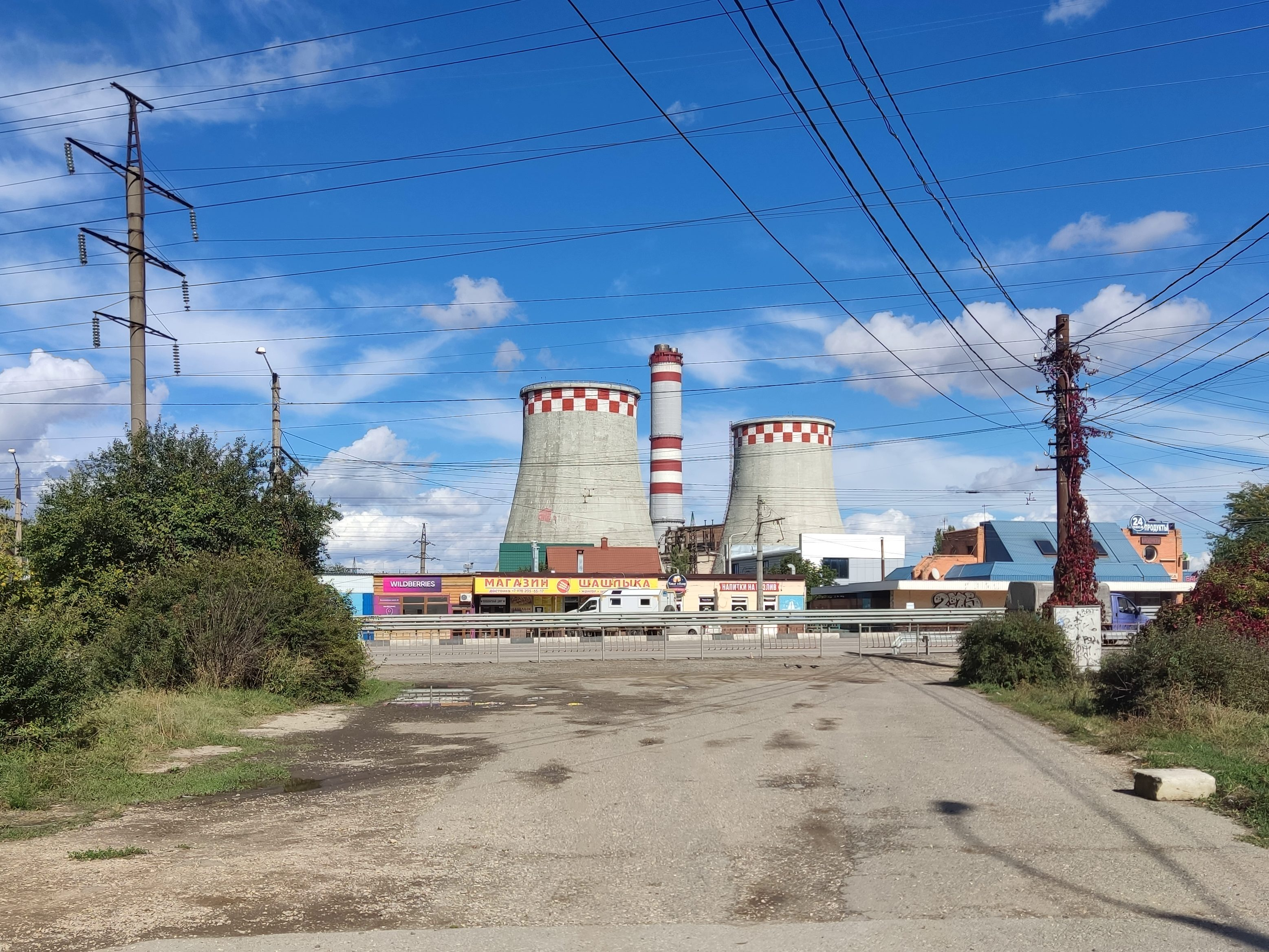
Simferopol Thermal Power Plant in October 2022

On 24 June 2026, Ukrainian drones managed to strike the old Simferopol Thermal Power Plant (built in 1958) and Sevastopol's main electric substation, further disrupting the power grid and leaving large parts of Crimea without electricity. On 20, 22 and 25 June 2026, the new Taurida Thermal Power Plant (built in 2018–2019) was also hit by successive Ukrainian drone strikes. Finally, the other new Balaklava Thermal Power Plant (built in 2018) was damaged by UAV attack on 25 June.

On 25 June 2026, the Kremlin-appointed city governor Mikhail Razvozhayev of Sevastopol announced further restrictions on how much electricity residents across the city were allowed to use, as Sevastopol was continuously plagued by power outages. Air raid sirens had become more regular occurrences in Sevastopol, sometimes multiple a day. While public transport was still running, petrol stations no longer sold fuel to the public. This led to public transport such as trolley buses being overwhelmed and overloaded, since no one could get to work using their private vehicles anymore. Several videos appeared from Simferopol, showing empty streets and public spaces that were usually full of cars and other vehicles. Another video posted on 24 June 2026 showed empty shelves in a local supermarket after cafes and canteens closed down, indicating the beginnings of food shortages. This was due to the fact that food supply businesses could no longer acquire fuel to transport their food products to retailers and markets across Crimea. In a 25 June interview, Razvozhayev also said that power restrictions had been implemented, intended to avoid overloading the Sevastopol power grid, although this caused several water supply outages due to a lack of electricity.

One attempted counter-measure by the Russian military as of late June 2026 has been to escort groups of tanker trucks with mobile anti-aircraft teams, with many soldiers on anti-drone duty. The Kyiv Independent commented on 25 June: "It doesn't seem to have helped much, as videos of numerous Russian logistics vehicles being destroyed by the Unmanned Systems Forces and a host of other Ukrainian military units are published on a daily basis. The mobile anti-aircraft teams themselves are frequently victims of Ukraine's prowling drones."

On 26 June, the Russian occupation authorities of Crimea and Sevastopol issued a joint declaration of a state of emergency. The stated goal was to "streamline economic issues", such as restoring energy facilities, securing operational management and essential supply purchase, as well as providing financial compensation for residents whose essential appliances were damaged due to power surges.

By 7 July, most parts of Crimea went completely dark at night due to a lack of electricity.

Due to rolling power cuts Crimean authorities have installed free landline phones, as Ukrainian drone strikes disrupted power and mobile services.

=== Disruption of tourism and exodus from Crimea ===
On 15 June, The Moscow Times reported news from tour operators, hotels and wineries reporting a surge in booking cancellations of Russian tourists wanting to spend holidays in Crimea. Given that about 80% of tourists normally travelled to Crimea by car, increasing (concerns over) fuel shortages prompted thousands of would-be tourists to reconsider their vacation plans. Industry representatives estimated 70~90% of trips booked for June had been cancelled, as well as about half of all reservations for July and August 2026. As the economy of Crimea had become heavily dependent on the tourism industry from Russia ever since the 2014 Russian annexation of Crimea, a flop of the 2026 holiday season could mean a serious blow for the republic's economy.

On 22 June, the Russian Union of Travel Industry acknowledged that holidays bookings to Crimea had fallen by 58% in the previous two weeks compared to the same period in June 2025, concluding that the 2026 tourist season had been effectively derailed. The cancellation of almost 400 summer camps for children, as well as other major events, greatly contributed to Russian tourists avoiding Crimea for the summer of 2026, while children at summer camps that had already begun would all be sent home.

In late June 2026, hundreds of vehicles trying to leave Crimea via the Crimean Bridge from Kerch (left) to Taman, Russia (right) caused traffic jams.

By 24 June, growing traffic jams of hundreds of vehicles trying to leave Crimea via the Kerch Bridge were reported. NRC commented on 25 June: "The Crimean Bridge may still be open for passenger traffic, but it has become a magnet for traffic jams. According to public sources, on Wednesday [24 June] there was a queue of more than eight hundred vehicles waiting to leave the peninsula for Russia – travellers are warned to expect a waiting time of around three hours. The delays are mainly caused by thorough security checks." Satellite images taken that day suggested the traffic jam was over 10 kilometres long, with Radio Svoboda estimating the involvement of 1,500 vehicles.

While a guesthouse owner in the holiday resort town of Novyi Svit claimed on 25 June that tourists from Russia were still arriving and were "cautious, not panicked", other Russian tourists complained about a complete lack of fuel in Crimea, with one woman from Russia recommending travelling with their own fuel rather than trying to refill on the peninsula. Other Russian tourists decided to cut their holidays short, and leave Crimea, while Russian military bloggers expressed increasing concerns about the peninsula's situation. By the evening of 25 June, independent Russian Telegram channel Astra concluded from OSINT analysis that the traffic jam on the Kerch side had grown to at least 15 kilometres.

On 26 June, the ISW quoted a Crimean Telegram channel as saying that, after the Crimean Bridge was closed down for 6 hours following a Ukrainian drone strike on the night of 25–26 June, a long queue of about 2,450 vehicles on the Kerch side of the Crimean Bridge, while no lines were observed on the Taman side, indicating that thousands of people were trying to leave Crimea towards Russia. The ISW estimated that "people leaving occupied Crimea likely include Russian tourists or residents of occupied Crimea, Russian military and security personnel associated with the Russian Black Sea Fleet (BSF), and occupation administrators." Ukrayinska Pravda instead quoted the "Krymsky Most: Operativnaya Informatsiya (Crimean Bridge: Operational Information)" Telegram channel as saying 750 vehicles were waiting on the Taman side (waiting time: about three hours), while 1,750 vehicles were waiting on the Kerch side (waiting time: over four hours). The Bridge was closed again for two hours on the night of 26–27 June, with occupation authorities claiming Russian forces had to intercept attacking Ukrainian drones first.

=== July 2026: unfolding polycrisis ===
On 3 July 2026, Ukraine destroyed seven Russian Sukhoi aircraft and two Shahed drone sheds at Saky air base, as well as severely damaging the Kerch oil terminal on 6 July. By 11 July 2026, almost all bridges to Crimea (except the Kerch Bridges) had been damaged or destroyed, while shipping in the Sea of Azov was relentlessly attacked in the first half of July, both supplies from Russia to Crimea and exports of oil (by the Russian shadow fleet), grain and other goods from the Don river through the Kerch Strait. Ukrainian Navy spokesperson Dmytro Pletenchuk told Suspilne that using fuel tankers to supply Crimea via the Sea of Azov was the only option Russia had left after the land corridor was effectively cut off, and "As far as we know, they don't use the Kerch Bridge for [fuel] transportation in the necessary volumes". Moreover, the Ukrainians were systematically targeting electricity substations and energy facilities to disrupt power distribution throughout the occupied peninsula.

"The fuel supply situation remains tense and will continue for some time. On certain days there will be no fuel available to be freely sold."

— Sergey Aksyonov
(Kremlin-appointed Head of the Republic of Crimea, 8 July 2026)

Consequently, there was virtually no fuel available anymore throughout Crimea by mid-July. On 8 July, Aksyonov stated that the fuel crisis in Crimea would probably last for some time, with fuel only intermittently being available. Fuel sales to civilians had been entirely banned in Sevastopol by 10 July. This suggested that the occupying government was forced to manage a deeper logistical crisis instead of just a short-term supply problem. Occupation authorities promised in early July to solve all supply problems within two weeks, without specifying how they would do so. The Crimean fuel crisis led to ever worse power outages (with one resident reporting "only five hours of electricity over four and a half days", causing problems for water supply, refrigerators and air conditioning), communications disruption (the Internet being "effectively down" in many places), and shortages of food and water. Russian tourists still seeking to travel to Crimea reported obligatory background checks including interviews with officials before being allowed to proceed, or said they cancelled their Crimean holiday plans because of fears of drone attacks. Local Crimeans reported empty beaches as most tourists from Russia had left or were leaving. Some stranded tourists were requesting assistance to evacuate Crimea, as they could no longer leave the peninsula by their own means. Hotels trying to save the tourist season with cut-price deals were reportedly only attracting Crimean residents themselves. Electricity shortages effectively forced many small businesses to shut down, or only accept cash, but sell their products or services at steeply higher prices.

The crisis also undermined Russia's ability to use Crimea as a hub for its military logistics inside occupied southern Ukraine. Military trucks, generators, air defence systems, naval support and logistics movements (including for ammunition and troop transport) were all fuel-dependent, and all fuel supply disruptions increased the cost and long-term sustainability of the Russian occupation.

=== August 2026: weeks without power, water and fuel ===
By mid-August, all of Crimea was affected by long-term lack of electricity (including electric light and Internet connection), running water, and fuel, with many people having lived without any electricity for weeks. The situation is the worst in northern Crimea, where some people may only have two to three hours a day to turn on electricity to charge appliances running on batteries. Most household appliances such as electric kettles do not work on the low voltage intermittently available there. The Russian occupation authorities attempted to restart the transformers several times in places such as Dzhankoy and Armyansk, but did not succeed. The Crimean Soda Plant in Krasnoperekopsk (Yany Kapu) and Crimean Titan in Armyansk were shut down, and no infrastructure would be provided during the winter, prompting most of their workers to quit their jobs and return home to the villages in southern Kherson Oblast where they came from.

The western and southern coasts have it somewhat better, with regular power outages of five to six hours a day. Many homes and shops throughout the peninsula had no electric lights or working refrigerators anymore, meaning a lot of foodstuffs spoilt and had to be discarded, while shops that could not refrigerate food that was at risk of spoiling had to close down. Several companies were ordered by the occupation authorities to go into idle mode as well, to save electricity and fuel. Discount supermarket chain Voda-Eda ran out of dairy products first, then cheese and sausage; it supplanted those empty shelves with beer and cognac, but such products cannot replace the nutritional value of dairy. Many shops also ran out of sugar. Of the remaining food types that were still available, the prices have risen sharply.

According to Serhii Danylov, deputy director of the Ukrainian Centre for Middle Eastern Studies in Kyiv, the "state of emergency" declared by the occupation authorities had the characteristics of martial law, although they did not want to say so for propaganda purposes. Since 2014, the Kremlin had been trying to "sell" an idealised picture of Crimea as a beautiful and peaceful place where there is no war. This not only serves as justification for the illegal annexation and continued occupation of Crimea, with continued real or imagined support from its residents, but also attract enough tourists from Russia proper during the summer season, which the Crimean economy had become dependent on. The occupiers promised in mid-June 2026 that the situation would be resolved "in two or three weeks", but instead, things got worse, leading to increasing popular resentment against the Russian occupation authorities. Danylov argued that the occupation authorities were unable to really change the economic situation, and instead focused on tightly controlling the information space, not providing adequate information on what is going on, or addressing civilians' requests for emergency assistance, essentially leaving most of them to their fate.

Significant groups of residents were observed departing from Crimea to the Russian Federation during the summer of 2026, including entrepreneurs from Sevastopol. Families of employees of Rosgvardiya and law enforcement agencies who had settled in Kherson Oblast were also observed returning to Russia. Danylov said: "In almost all cases that I know of, the Russians have taken their children's documents from local schools. They are not selling their housing in Crimea yet. They probably expect to return in the future. But now they are no longer sure about the upcoming school year." Concerns over how to get through the upcoming winter without electricity, water and poor communications, motivated especially families with children from Russia to return to Russia, and Ukrainian families to move to mainland Ukraine.

=== November 2026 Crimean Bridge destruction impact ===
The Crimean Bridge is a critical supply route for Russian forces in Crimea. The bridge has been described as a symbol of modern Russian imperialism and the occupation of Crimea, and the attack was described by the Kyiv Independent as a "dent in Russia's imperial ambition". Zelenskyy described the strike as an "unprecedented operation in response to Russian attacks on our infrastructure".

== See also ==
- Drone Line
- Operation MoLoChKa
- 2022 Crimean Bridge explosion
- 2023 Crimean Bridge explosion
- 2025 Crimean Bridge explosion
- 2026 Crimean Bridge explosions
- 2026 Penza Oblast mobilisation
- 2025 Russian fuel crisis
- 2026 Ukrainian counteroffensive
- 2026 Dobropillia offensive
- Bridges in the Russo-Ukrainian war § Bridges connecting Crimea
- Kerch Strait ferry line § During the full-scale Russian invasion of Ukraine since 2022
- Operation Spiderweb
- Russian Kyiv convoy (early 2022, northern front of the Russian invasion of Ukraine)
- Timeline of the Russo-Ukrainian war (1 January 2026 – 31 May 2026)
- Timeline of the Russo-Ukrainian war (1 June 2026 – present)
- Women drone operators in the Ukrainian military

== Bibliography ==
- Beaumont, Peter (11 June 2026). "'Highway of death': the Ukrainian drone campaign menacing Russian logistics". The Guardian.
- Crimea.Realities (8 June 2026). "Russia Suspends Train Service To Occupied Crimea After Ukraine Drone Strike; Gasoline Shortages Worsen". Radio Liberty.
- Eastwood, Brent M. (11 June 2026). "Russia's Last Supply Road to Crimea Has Earned a Grim New Name: The 'Highway of Death'". National Security Journal.
- Hockenos, Paul (2 July 2026). "The Strategy Behind the Battle for Crimea: Ukraine's new offensive on the territory has military stakes far beyond payback". Foreign Policy.
- Korshak, Stefan (18 June 2026). "Meet the Elite Ukrainian Drone Units, 'Ace' Pilots Targeting Russian Fuel Trucks, Logistics". Kyiv Post.
- Legalov, Evgeny (10 June 2026). "Сухопутный коридор в ад. Удары ВСУ по российской логистике" [Land Corridor to Hell: Ukrainian Armed Forces Strikes Russian Logistics]. Radio Svoboda (in Russian).
- Parker, Jessica (6 May 2026). "Oleshky the front-line city where Ukrainians are trapped". BBC News.
- Struck-Feshchenko, Julia (11 June 2026). "Ukraine Turns R-280 Into 'Highway of Death' Cutting Russia's Crimea Lifeline". Kyiv Post.
- Stuart, Riley (30 May 2026). "This road was Russia's key logistics route but now it's a 'highway to hell'". ABC News (Australia).
- "Ключова траса до Криму перетворилась на «шосе смерті» завдяки домінуванню українських дронів - The Guardian" [Key route to Crimea has become a ‘highway of death’ due to the dominance of Ukrainian drones - The Guardian]. Ukrinform (in Ukrainian). 11 June 2026.
