= MV Reyhan Sari =

- Lady Celine in Casablanca, Morocco

History

Turkey
- Name: Lady Celine (2011–2020); Eldoris (2020–2023); Reyhan Sari (2023–present)
- Owner: T ve O Denizcilik Ltd. Şti
- Port of registry: Valetta, Malta (2011-2023); Istanbul, Turkey (2023-present)
- Builder: Hyundai Mipo Dockyard. Ulsan, South Korea
- Completed: 2011
- Identification: IMO number: 9543342; MMSI number: 271051337; Callsign: TCA7486
- Status: In service

MV Reyhan Sari is a Turkish-owned, Turkish-flagged Handysize bulk carrier built in 2011 by Hyundai Mipo Dockyard in Ulsan, South Korea. Launched as Lady Celine and later renamed Eldoris, she took her current name in 2023 after passing to Turkish ownership, and is registered in Istanbul.

== Description ==
Reyhan Sari is a Handysize bulk carrier built by the Hyundai Mipo Dockyard in Ulsan, South Korea. It has a beam of 28 metres (92 ft), is 178 metres (584 ft) long, and has a draft of 28 metres (92 ft). Its gross tonnage is 23,072 GT and has a deadweight of 36,000 tons. The ship is owned by T ve O Denizcilik Ltd. Şti, and primarily engages in the tramp trade, transporting grain and coal.

== History ==
=== 2026 Black Sea drone attack ===
==== Attack and rescue ====
On 22 July 2026, Reyhan Sari was sailing in the Black Sea from the Russian port of Tuapse, Krasnodar Krai with a load of 36,134 metric tonnes of wheat flour bound for Trabzon, Turkey, when the vessel was attacked by multiple one-way attack unmanned aerial vehicles. Damage was reported to multiple sections of the ship, including the funnel and accommodation area, as well as damage to the ships communication systems.

The ship had a crew of twenty-two Turkish civilian sailors aboard, and reported no prior warning, challenge or order to stop. A Turkish Coast Guard helicopter evacuated two crew members, with Enes Torun suffering minor cuts, while Ufuk Yilmaz suffered serious injuries to both legs. In an interview with Ihlas News Agency, Torun described the attack:

I had just gotten up from my watch around 1:30 a.m. They hit my cabin with a drone. They pulled me out from under the wreckage. While I was in the sickbay, the second explosion happened. They blew up the deck completely.

Boatswain Savaş Çakar (54 years), was killed after being crushed due to structural damage to the crew quarters. The sailor was initially reported as missing, as rescue workers were unable to reach the damaged section of the ship. Despite sustaining significant damage, Reyhan Sari continued sailing under her own power, reaching the Turkish coast. The recovery of Çakar's body, buried under rubble, was conducted place and an explosives sweep was conducted by the Disaster and Emergency Management Presidency. A funeral took place on 24 July 2026 for Çakar in his hometown of Derince, Kocaeli Province and was buried at the August 17th Earthquake Cemetery.

==== Repairs ====
On 5 August, major repairs to Reyhan Sari began in Tuzla, Istanbul, consisting of repair to structural damage as well as interior refitting. On 11 September, the vessel fully returned to operational service.

==== Alleged communications ====
On 17 August, Abbas Çakar, editor of the Turkish news outlet Kocaeli Gündem, and brother of Savaş Çakar said that he received an email from Robert "Magyar" Brovdi, the commander of the Ukrainian Unmanned Systems Forces, following a news report demanding accountability for the attack. The message read that his brother "knowingly chose his path, helped enrich Russia, and got what he deserved". The Ukrainian ambassador to Ankara, Nariman Dzhelyalov rejected the claim, suggesting that the message was a fabrication and offering condolences to the family.

==== Submission to the International Criminal Court ====
On 8 October, a formal submission was made to the International Criminal Court in relation to the strike, submitted by Memisoglu Kurun Law Firm. The firm stated that an investigation of the ship showed that it had been hit by cluster munitions with an armoured piercing warhead, with explosives piercing the outer plating of the living quarters and launching a large number of projectiles into the interior, allegedly proving the intent to kill. The firm stated that 12 sailors had filed complaints, as well as the family of the deceased sailor Çakar. Kurun noted that there was no precedent regarding drone attacks on ships, and that the application could be effective in ending similar attacks in the future. It was further emphasised that Ukrainian authorities had shared information about the strike on official channels as part of Operation MoLoChKa, attributing the attack to a video published by the 413th Regiment of Unmanned Systems. The application alleged violations in Article 7 and Article 8 of the Rome Statute. A preliminary review of the case was placed to take place over the next six months.
