= Crimean Bridge explosion =

Crimean Bridge explosion may refer to:

- 2022 Crimean Bridge explosion
- 2023 Crimean Bridge explosion
- 2025 Crimean Bridge explosion
- 2026 Crimean Bridge explosions
