= Operation MoLoChKa =

2026 Ukrainian drone campaign against Russian shadow fleet vessels

- Part of the Ukrainian attacks on the Russian shadow fleet campaign, part of the Russo-Ukrainian war
Date	6 July 2026 – ongoing
Location	Sea of Azov and Black Sea
Status	Ongoing

Belligerents
Ukraine	Russia

Commanders and leaders
(Ukraine) Robert Brovdi ("Magyar")	No centralized leadership

Units involved
Unmanned Systems Forces of Ukraine: 20th Unmanned Systems Brigade; 412th Unmanned Systems Brigade; 414th Unmanned Strike Aviation Brigade; 427th Unmanned Systems Brigade; 1st Center of the Unmanned Systems Forces; 413th Regiment of Unmanned Systems; Security Service of Ukraine	

Casualties and losses
	300 vessels struck: Sea of Azov - 134; Black Sea - 166

Operation MoLoChKa (Ukrainian: Молочка) is an ongoing Ukrainian military campaign, launched on 6 July 2026, using naval and aerial attack drones against tankers and other vessels of the Russian shadow fleet in the Sea of Azov, later extending into the Black Sea. The joint SBS and SBU campaign is commanded by Robert Brovdi ("Magyar"), head of Ukraine's Unmanned Systems Forces.

== Background ==
On 25 June 2026, President Zelenskyy approved a 40-day influence operation of long-range, mid-range and SBU operations to push Russia toward ending the war, with a wide range of strikes including against shipping. The 40-day influence operation was extended on 4 August.

On 6 July, Robert Brovdi posted the first videos of drone strikes on the Sea of Azov shadow fleet, Captain Barmin and Sanar-3 were hit. Vessels were hit by guided mid range one way drones, including the FP-1 and FP-2 drones by Firepoint. Vessels struck include shadow-fleet oil tankers, gas tankers, cargo ships, ferries, tugboats, at least one LNG tanker. The drone strike campaign was meant to disrupt Russian trade routes that are critical to the Kremlin's war economy. The attacks were meant to complicate fuel deliveries to Crimea. On 15 July 2026, Robert Brovdi said that the Sea of Azov chapter had expanded to the Black Sea chapter.

== Naming ==
According to Robert Brovdi, the operation name "MoLoCHKa" stands for the first letters of the phrase "МОсква Ляже Через Крим", roughly translated to "Moscow will fall through Crimea". The abbreviation is also a common slang for "dairy".

== Course of the campaign ==
- 6 July: tankers Captain Barmin and Sanar-3 were hit
- 7 July: Ukraine said they had struck 10 vessels, including eight tankers from the Russian shadow fleet delivering fuel to occupied Crimea, in an unspecified area of the Sea of Azov. A video was posted with drone-view footage from multiple UAVs, in which said tankers were hit and caught fire. The same source also claimed that two more tankers were struck the same day. The Turkish flagged and owned tanker Yasa Polaris, chartered by Chevron, was damaged by a drone strike while approaching the Russian Port of Novorossiysk to undergo loading of Kazakh oil at the Caspian Pipeline Consortium oil terminal. The vessel reported damage to her superstructure, but no hull damage. As a result, Yasa Polaris was able to safely sail towards the safety of Turkey under her own power.
- 8 July: A following update by Brovdi stated that Ukrainian aerial and sea drones had struck 9 more vessels, bringing the total to 21 within 72 hours from the first attack, 19 of which were tankers allegedly part of the Russian shadow fleet.
- 9 July: 14 more ships, including 12 tankers were hit, bringing the total to 35. Those figures were later updated to a total of 36 ships struck, 32 of which were tankers allegedly part of the Russian shadow fleet.
- 10 July: Brovdi announced that with another 13 ships struck in the Sea of Azov, 10 of which were tankers, the number of Russian vessels hit reached "almost 50". Consequently, Russia halted shipping through the Volga-Don Canal, a move that impacted Russia's fuel transport and grain export.
- 11 July: Brovdi announced that overnight, another 28 Russian ships had been hit in the Sea of Azov, bringing the total number up to 76.
- 12 July: Ten tankers and four ferries were hit, bringing the total to 90 vessels targeted in one week, Brovdi said.
- 13 July: 15 more vessels were hit, bringing the total to 105
- 14 July: USF struck 11 more vessels, 5 tankers, 5 dry cargo ships, and 1 tugboat, for a total of 116 over 9 days
- 15 July 2026 - Brovdi said that 20 vessels in the Black Sea were hit by Ukrainian drones, including 17 oil tankers, 2 gas tankers, 1 tugboat.
- 16 July: 11 more ships in the Black Sea and Sea of Azov -
- 17 July: 12 Ships in the black sea The Liberian flagged tanker, Nordic Zenith, owned by Nordic American Tankers and chartered by ExxonMobil, was damaged by two drone strikes and caught fire as it approached the Russian Port of Novorossiysk to undergo loading at the Caspian Pipeline Consortium oil terminal. In an official press statement, the CPC stated that the fire was extinguished and thirteen crew members were evacuated. Furthermore, the tanker was declared unfit for mooring or loading operations at the oil terminal.
- 18 July: 13 vessels were struck in the Black Sea and Sea of Azov
- 19 July: The Caspian Pipeline Consortium reported in the Port of Novorossiysk, the Liberian flagged, Greek owned tanker Asia, and the Marshall Islands flagged, Greek owned tanker Nissos Ios, were attacked during loading operations, but that there were no injuries or oil spills. CPC did not identify a responsible party for the attack. The Ministry of Foreign Affairs of Kazakhstan issued a statement condemning the unmanned aerial vehicle strikes which took place on the 17th and 19th of July, stating that it would "consider such attacks to be an unacceptable infringement on the economic interests of the Republic of Kazakhstan."
- 31 July 2026: American Vice President JD Vance asked Ukraine President Volodymyr Zelenskyy to halt the drone strike campaign on the Black Sea tankers

== Impact and response ==
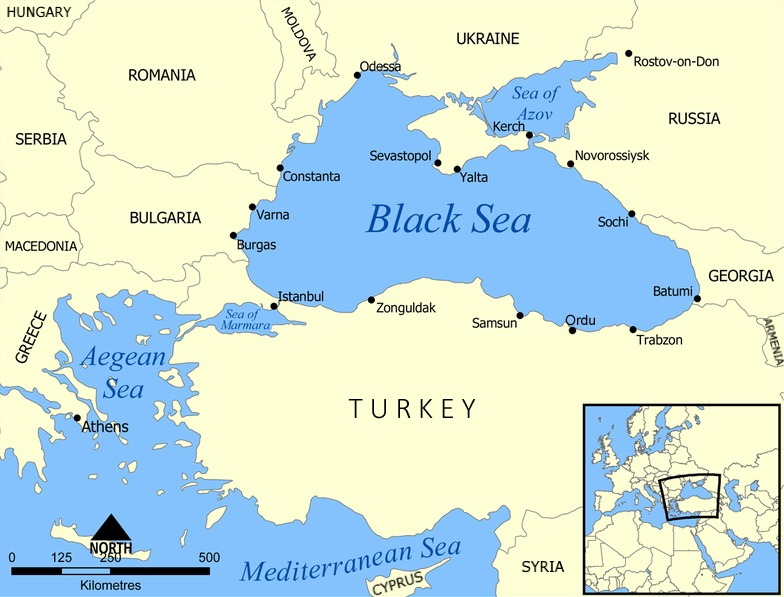
Map of the Black Sea

By 11 July 2026, Russia halted the shipping channel through the Don-Azov Channel as well as the Kerch Strait due to the strikes. Up to 25% of wheat exports from Russia pass through the Sea of Azov. The Russian Agriculture Ministry said they would begin rerouting grain shipments away from the Sea of Azov following the strikes.

In mid-July 2026, it was reported that four out of thirteen large grain terminals in the region had suspended services. Grain exporter Kernel Holding suspended operations at the Port of Chornomorsk on 13 July, citing significant destruction of its loading and processing infrastructure, as well as the loss of 45,000 tons of wheat and 9,000 tones of sunflower oil. Robert Brovdi estimated that the operation had reduced the Kerch Strait ferry crossing capacity by 75%. In the start of the campaign there were over 100 vessels near the Kerch Strait, by July 19 that number had reduced to about twelve. Russia's largest Black Sea oil port Sheskharis located in the Port of Novorossiysk halted loading on 21 July due to the operation.

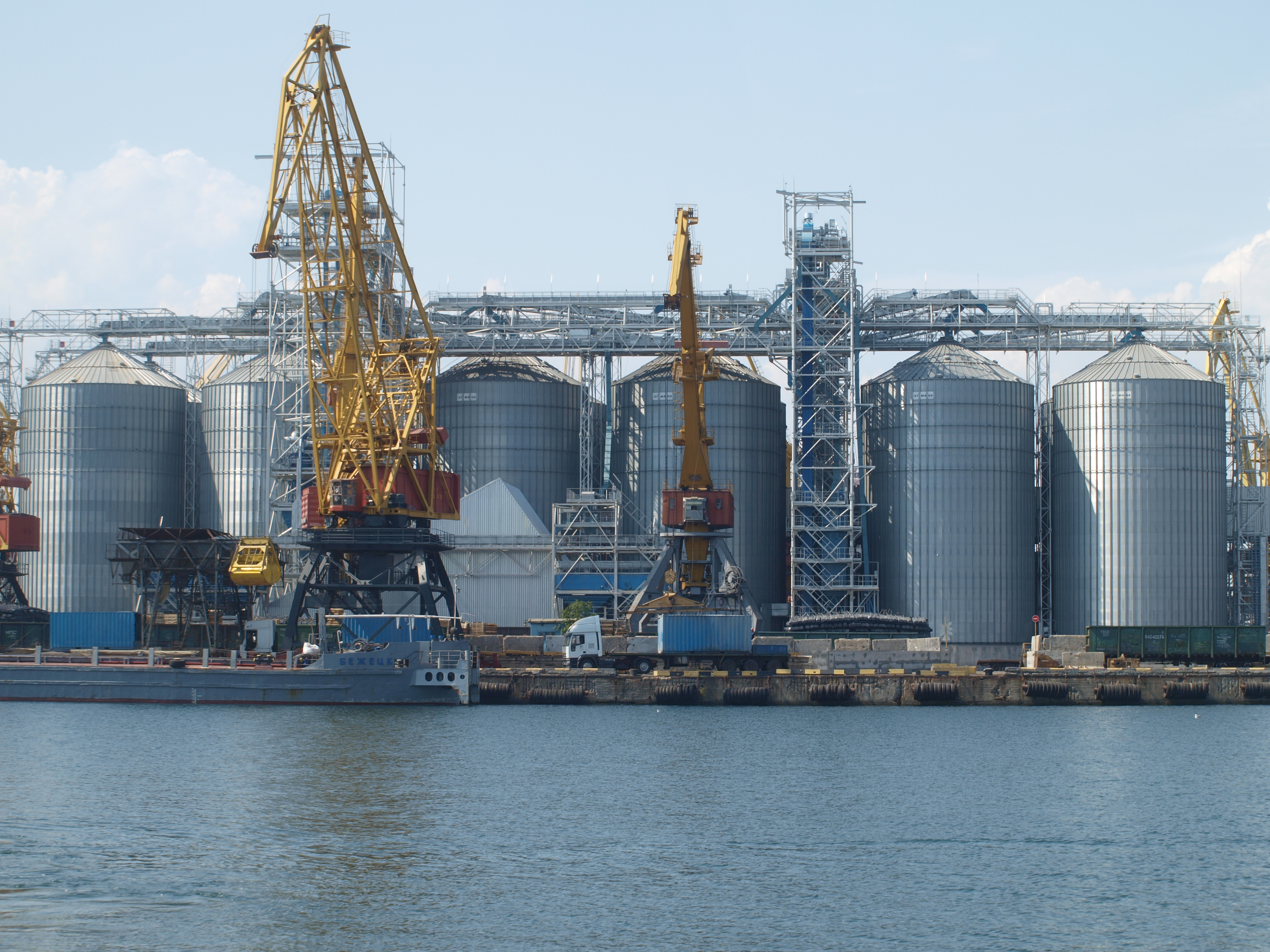
Grain elevators in the Port of Odesa

On 18 July 2026, in response to the attacks, Robert Brovdi reported that the Russian Rubicon drone unit had moved 200 of its crew away from the frontline and to protect the Sea of Azov and Black Sea along with the entire 51st Air Defence Division.

In response to the disruption of its own fuel and cargo logistics, Russia has escalated a persistent campaign of missile and drone strikes against Ukraine's shipping facilities in the Black Sea, targeting the ports of Odesa, Chornomorsk and Pivdennyi in particular. On 17 July 2026, Financial Times reported that Ukraine's Black Sea grain exports were facing a severe crisis, with attacks on Odesa resulting in a one-third reduction in grain storage capacity, leading traders to pause shipments due to heightened security risks. Traders have reported widespread logistical problems, including difficulties with procurement, sales and cargo accumulation.

The rate of attacks slowed in the week of August 2026, Unmanned Systems Forces of Ukraine commented that the campaign had forced the shadow fleet vessels to change their planning including routes, methods of cover, and approaches to transportation.

On 31 July 2026, American Vice President JD Vance asked Ukraine President Volodymyr Zelenskyy to halt the drone strike campaign on the Black Sea tankers. Ukraine agreed to not target Caspian Pipeline Consortium targets or non-Russian vessels as long as they were not under sanctions.

== Reactions ==
=== National ===
During a press conference held on 14 July 2026, Russia's foreign minister Sergei Lavrov called the strikes "terrorism".

=== International ===
On 13 July 2026, the International Maritime Organization (IMO) formally condemned the attacks against civilian merchant ships operating in the Sea of Azov and the Black Sea. The IMO's Secretary-General Arsenio Dominguez issued a statement which emphasised the protection of civilian crews, the upholding of freedom of navigation in international waters, and the significant ecological risks posed to the Black Sea. The organization stressed that merchant seafarers are neutral parties and that current actions create unacceptable dangers to shipping and the environment, noting that the operation represented the largest observed attack against merchant shipping since the beginning of the Russo-Ukrainian war. The IMO rejected the justification that a ship's destination makes the seafarers onboard valid targets.

== See also ==
- Unmanned surface vehicle
- Deep strike campaign
- Middle strike campaign
- Naval warfare in the Russo-Ukrainian war (2022–present)
- Ukrainian attacks on the Russian shadow fleet
- Russian shadow fleet
- 2022 Russian invasion of Ukraine
- Sanctions against Russia
- Kerch Strait ferry line
