= 20th Unmanned Systems Brigade =

Ukrainian Ground Forces unit

20th Brigade of Unmanned Systems K-2
- 20 бригада безпілотних систем К-2
- Insignia of the brigade
- Active: 2018 – present
- Country: Ukraine
- Branch: Unmanned Systems Forces
- Role: Unmanned Systems
- Size: 1,500 – 10,000
- Motto: Their Deaths Are Our Lives
- Engagements: Russo-Ukrainian war; Eastern Ukraine campaign; Battle of Marinka; Battle of Siversk; Battle of Soledar; Middle strike campaign; Operation MoLoChKa
- Website: Official Website

Commanders
- Current commander: Lt. Col. Kyrylo Veres

The 20th Unmanned Systems Brigade ('K-2') (Ukrainian: 20 окрема бригада безпілотних систем К-2) is a brigade of the Unmanned Systems Forces in Ukraine.

== History ==
Insurgency

The unit began in February 2017 as a small reconnaissance group within the 92nd Assault Brigade. It was led by Kyrylo Veres. With only about a dozen soldiers, the unit operated in high-risk areas near Marinka and Krasnohorivka, conducting ambushes, raids, and missions behind enemy lines. From the start, it used DJI Phantom drones for aerial reconnaissance, becoming one of the first Ukrainian units to do so. In January 2018, the group was moved to the 54th Mechanized Brigade and began using more advanced drones like the DJI Mavic. It took part in combat near Troitske and Popasna. Later in 2020, the unit was deployed to Avdiivka as part of the 54th Brigade’s second mechanized battalion, holding positions in the industrial zone and at the Zenit plant. Kyrylo Veres became deputy commander of the battalion during this time. In 2021, the unit returned to the Marinka-Krasnohorivka area, where it began using DJI Mavic and Autel drones more systematically for reconnaissance and started testing heavy bomber drones like the "Kazhan," "Vampire," and "Baba Yaga." These drones were used to drop TM-62 anti-tank mines from the air.

Invasion

When Russia launched its full-scale invasion in February 2022, K-2 had grown into a full battalion. During the Battle of Marinka in March 2022, it stopped a Russian armored advance by destroying two tanks and two infantry fighting vehicles. To reduce losses, Major Kyrylo Veres ordered a tactical retreat to a second defense line. The next day, Ukrainian forces retook the lost positions. For his leadership, Veres was officially named commander of K-2 in April 2022.From July 2022, K-2 took part in the Battle of Siversk, defending a 12-kilometer front line east of Verkhnyokamyanske. It resisted repeated attacks by the Wagner Group and prevented major Russian advances over two and a half years. The unit gained public attention by posting combat videos online, including one showing the destruction of a stranded Russian tank after it failed to retake the “T-shape” salient. In the summer of 2023, during the Battle of Soledar, K-2’s FPV drone pilots killed dozens of Russian soldiers, allowing other Ukrainian units to launch a successful counterattack with few casualties. By fall 2023, the battalion had grown to about 1,000 personnel.

Expansion

On December 8, 2024, K-2 was officially expanded into a regiment as part of Ukraine’s Drone Line project, a national effort to strengthen drone warfare capabilities. Along with four other elite units, K-2 became a central part of this initiative. The announcement led to a surge in interest: 7,000 people applied to join within a month, and that number grew to over 11,000 by April 2025. In September 2025, the regiment was expanded to a brigade.

Ground Drones

During 2025, the unit appeared to switch from Uncrewed Aerial Vehicles (UAV) to Uncrewed Ground Vehicles (UGV), or: ground-drones. It appears to be one of - if not the - leading Ukrainian units in the development of Unmanned Ground Systems.

== Structure ==
As of 2025, the brigade's structure was as following:

- 20th Separate Brigade of Unmanned Systems K-2
  - Brigade Headquarters & Headquarters Company
  - Unmanned Ground Systems Battalion

== Equipment ==
Name	Photo	Origin	Notes
Unmanned Aerial Vehicles
Ukrspecsystems Shark		Ukraine	
Vampire		Ukraine	
Kazhan		Ukraine	
Wild Hornets		Ukraine	
DARTS		Ukraine	
DJI Mavic		China	
Autel		China	
Vehicles
Toyota Land Cruiser Prado		Japan	
Mitsubishi Triton		Japan	
Renault Duster		France	
