= 412th Unmanned Systems Brigade =

412th Unmanned Systems Brigade "NEMESIS"
- 412-й окремий полк безпілотних систем «NEMESIS»
- Active: 2023-present
- Country: Ukraine
- Branch: Unmanned Systems Forces
- Type: Brigade
- Role: Unmanned Aerial Vehicle operations
- Part of: Armed Forces of Ukraine
- Nickname: NEMESIS
- Engagements: Russo-Ukrainian War
- Website: 412nemesis.army

Insignia
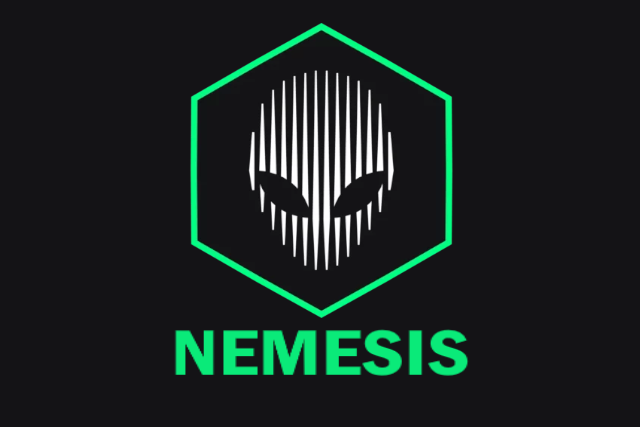
- Flag

The 412th Unmanned Systems Brigade ('Nemesis') is a military unit of the Unmanned Systems Forces of the Armed Forces of Ukraine.

== History ==
=== 2023 ===
The unit was established on December 29, 2023, as the 412th Separate Battalion of Unmanned Systems, with support from the 101st Guards Brigade of the General Staff. It was tasked with destroying air defenses, disrupting logistical routes, and targeting artillery, engineering fortifications, other equipment, and personnel. After the establishment of the Unmanned Systems Forces in 2024, the battalion became part of it.

=== 2024 ===
In October 2024, the 412th Separate Battalion Unmanned Systems NEMESIS destroyed a pontoon crossing in the Luhansk region.

In November 2024, a battalion operator dropped a munition on a Buk-M2 air defense system but initially missed, causing the system to attempt an escape. On the fourth attempt, a cumulative munition struck the turret, but the extent of the damage was unclear, and it did not result in the immediate destruction of the vehicle.

On November 2, 2024 the 412th Separate Battalion struck an Osa surface-to-air missile system on the Luhansk front.

On November 17, 2024 the 412th Separate Battalion hit a Tor air defense system, valued at approximately $25 million, on the Donetsk front.

On November 28, 2024 the FPV drone unit ASGARD, which operates airplane-type strike drones, became a part of the Unmanned Systems Forces and integrated into the 412th Battalion NEMESIS.

On December 5, 2024 battalion units destroyed a 9A331M2 combat vehicle of the Russian Tor-M2 air defense system in the Zaporizhzhia region.

=== 2025 ===
At the beginning of February 2025 the NEMESIS regiment destroyed an enemy Buk anti-aircraft missile system in the Zaporizhia direction and a Russian BM-21 "Grad" MLRS in Luhansk Oblast.

In late February 2025 the regiment claimed that it destroyed a M-1978 Koksan in Luhansk oblast. Footage of the claimed attack was published on Telegram.

In November 2025 the regiment was expanded to a Brigade.

Over a month, from December 2025 and January 2026, the 412th Brigade destroyed some $250 million worth of air defence systems including a S-350 Vityaz and “two Tor-M2 systems, two Buk-M1 systems, one Tor-M1 one Buk-M3, and one Strela-10 short-range air defense system”.

=== 2026 ===
In July 2026, the Nemesis took part in Operation Molochka, targeting Russian shadow fleet vessels in the Sea of Azov and Black Sea. During the 2026 Combined Resolved exercise in Germany, operators from the brigade served as part of the opposing force against United States troops. According to the Wall Street Journal, Ukrainian drone operators quickly located U.S. vehicles and simulated attacks using reconnaissance drones, first person view drones and drone drop munitions, which led the American forces to adjust its dispersal, camouflage and electronic warfare tactics.

== Structure ==
- Asgard group
- Technology Center "Dark Node"
