= 413th Regiment of Unmanned Systems =

413th Unmanned Systems Regiment "RAID"
- 413-й окремий батальйон безпілотних систем «Рейд»
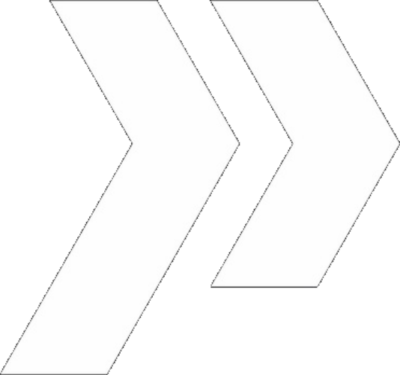
- Regimental symbol
- Active: 2024-present
- Country: Ukraine
- Branch: Unmanned Systems Forces
- Type: Regiment
- Role: Unmanned Aerial Vehicle operations
- Part of: Armed Forces of Ukraine
- Nickname: RAID
- Engagements: Russo-Ukrainian War: Russian invasion of Ukraine; Eastern Ukraine campaign; Kursk offensive (2024–2025)

Commanders
- Current Commander: Major Yevhen Karas

The 413th Unmanned Systems Regiment ('Raid') is a regiment of the Unmanned Systems Forces in Ukraine.

It was established as a separate battalion in 2024, detached from the 14th UAV Regiment. It was in combat following the Russian invasion of Ukraine and in the Kursk offensive.

== History ==
On 13 September 2024, the 14th UAV Regiment announced a reorganization of its structure. The "Reid" Battalion and 14th Regiment's deputy commander Yevgeny Karas left the regiment and established the 413th Separate Unmanned Systems Battalion.

In September 2024, the 413th separate battalion, in cooperation with the information from 78th Airborne Regiment destroyed a rare, state-of-the-art remote "Zemledeliye" minelayer.

On September 23, it was reported that the 413th battalion with support from the 78th Airborne Assault Regiment guided a HIMARS at a Russian Buk-M3, one of the most advanced air defense systems in the Russian military.

In October 2024, the Ukrainian Armed Forces reported that the battalion alone had inflicted losses of over $590 million on Russian forces. In November, a detachment of the Battalion directed Storm Shadow missiles that successfully hit and destroyed a Russian command post in the village of Mar'ino in Kursk Oblast.

The battalion was amongst the first to partake in the 2024 Kursk offensive destroying multiple high value targets like an S-400 north of Kursk, a Pole-21, a Zoo radar, 20 Russian electronic warfare systems including Borysoglebsk, R-330 Zhitel and a Krasukha-4. On 4 February 2025, the battalion destroyed a Russian Osa air defense system. On 27 June 2025, the battalion destroyed a rare North Korean manufactured M-1991 multiple rocket launcher system via FPV drone, with the initial explosion causing a rocket to fly through the vehicle's crew cabin and injure the two occupants.

In late 2025, the battalion was expanded to regimental status.

On March 10, 2026, the regiment's aerial reconnaissance units provided real-time surveillance and coordination during a strike on the "Kremniy EL" microelectronics plant in Bryansk, Russia. The operation was confirmed by the General Staff of the Armed Forces of Ukraine.

In July 2026, the 413th took part in Operation Molochka, targeting Russian shadow fleet vessels in the Sea of Azov and Black Sea.

== Commanders ==
- Major Karas Yevhen Vasilyevich (2024-)

== Structure ==
The structure of the regiment is as follows:

- Regimental Headquarters and Headquarters Company
- Commandant Platoon
- Dzhmil UAV Unit
- Nightingale UAV Unit
