= 2025 Crimean Bridge explosion =

Event in the Russian invasion of Ukraine

- Part of the Crimea attacks during the Russo-Ukrainian war
- Video of the explosion released by the SBU
- Date: 3 June 2025
- Time: 4:44 a.m. (UTC+03:00)
- Location: Crimean Bridge
- Perpetrator: Security Service of Ukraine

On 3 June 2025, an explosion took place near the underwater supports of the Crimean Bridge, connecting the Crimean peninsula with the Russian mainland. The explosion was carried out by the Security Service of Ukraine, as a part of the Russo-Ukrainian war. The attack resulted in the closure of the bridge for several hours.

== Background ==
The Crimean Bridge is a pair of bridges which span the Kerch Strait between the Taman Peninsula of Krasnodar Krai in Russia and the Kerch Peninsula of Crimea. It was built by Russia after its annexation of Crimea at the start of 2014, to connect Crimea with the Russian mainland. The 19 km (12 mi) long bridge was opened in 2018. In February 2022, Russia launched its major offensive on Ukraine, resulting in the most deadliest phase of the Russo-Ukrainian War, that has been fought between the countries ever since the Crimean conflict in 2014. The war continued into 2025, with casualties and attacks from both sides. Ukraine had already targeted the bridge in two attacks in October 2022 and July 2023, with the bridge continuing to remain in service after the attacks.

== Attack ==
On 3 June 2025, at about 4:44 a.m. local time (UTC+03:00), an explosion occurred near the Crimean Bridge. The attack targeted one of the underwater supports of the bridge.

== Aftermath ==
The Security Service of Ukraine (SBU) released a statement along with the video confirming the attack on the bridge. It further stated that mines were laid under the bridge over several months by its agents. As per the report from SBU, explosives equivalent to 1,100 kilograms of TNT was used in the attack. The SBU claimed that the attack "badly damaged" the bridge supports. The operation was reportedly planned and coordinated by Vasyl Malyuk, the head of SBU.

Reuters confirmed the location of the video released by the SBU with the aid of satellite imagery, but said that it was not able to verify its authenticity.

A later report by a Russian news channel indicated that a Ukrainian attack targeted one of the piers of the bridge. It further stated that the bridge has not sustained significant damage, and the attack might have been carried out by a Ukrainian underwater drone. Following the attack, Russian news outlets reported that the bridge was temporarily closed until till 7:00 a.m. local time, after which it was opened for regular operations.

== See also ==
- Bridges in the Russo-Ukrainian War
- Attacks in Russia during the Russian invasion of Ukraine
