= 2025–2026 Russian fuel crisis =

Fuel crisis primarily caused by attacks

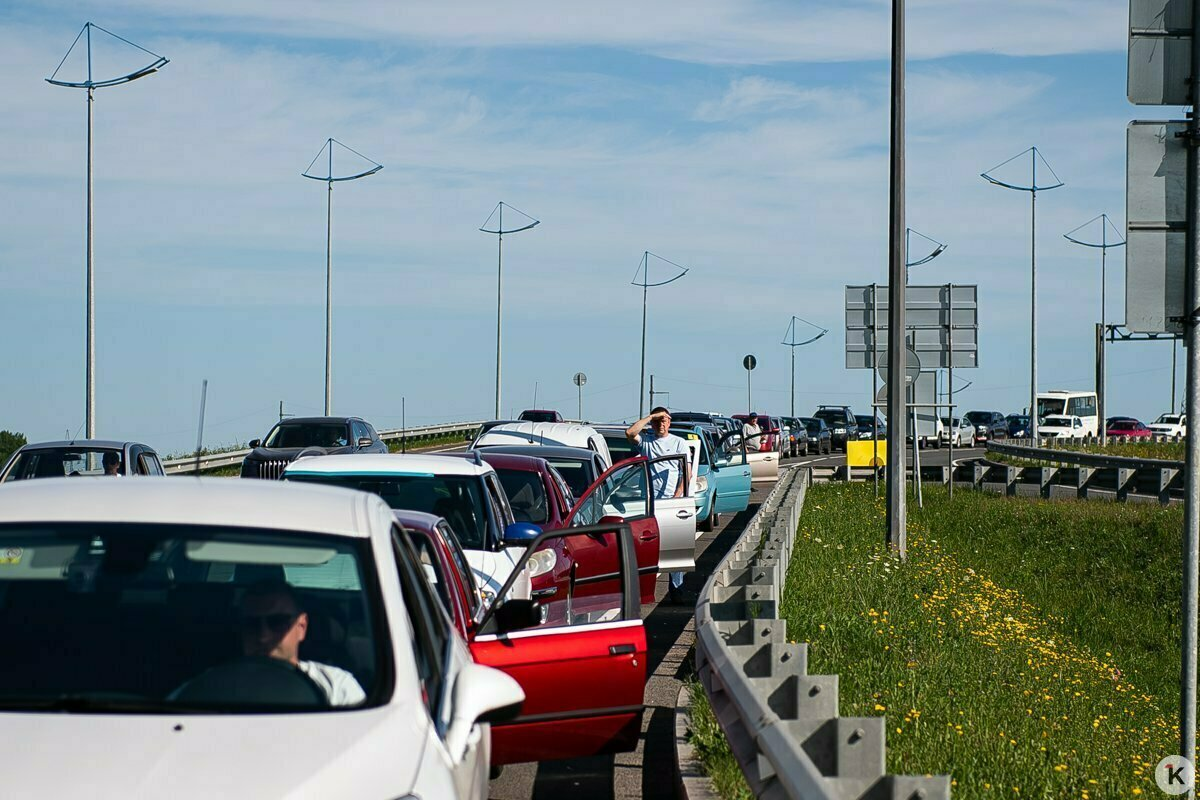
Line of cars waiting for fuel in Kaliningrad in July 2026

Starting in August 2025, increased Ukrainian drone attacks on Russian oil refineries during the Russo-Ukrainian War caused widespread damage and a significant decrease in production of refined products across the Russian oil industry, leading to a fuel crisis in the country. The crisis escalated in the middle of 2026, with Russian-controlled Crimea declaring a state of emergency in June and banning fuel sales.

By July 2026, most of Russia's regions were experiencing fuel restrictions, directly affecting 50 million people, approximately 35% of the Russian population. Russia suspended civilian shipping through the Don–Azov Shipping Canal and the Kerch Strait following concentrated attacks on oil tankers in the Sea of Azov and surrounding anchorages. A decree was signed allowing certain oil refineries to lower their production quality standards from Euro-5 gasoline to Euro-3 gasoline until the end of the year.

== Background ==
There have been several gasoline crises in Russia since the 2010s started, most recently in 2023. As part of the Russo-Ukrainian war, Ukrainian drones had occasionally targeted Russian refineries since 2024, causing expense and inconvenience.

== Ukrainian drone strikes in 2025 ==
War year	Number of strikes on Russia's oil facilities	
War year	In year	Cumulative
1st	3	3
2nd	13	16
3rd	92	108
4th	138	246
Feb '26– Jun '26	59	305

According to a 25 June 2026 analysis by CNN, Ukraine had struck Russian oil facilities over 300 times since the start of Russia's full-scale invasion on 24 February 2022. Only three strikes were performed in the first year of the war (February 2022 to February 2023), with an additional 13 in the second year. Ukraine's deep strike campaign on Russia's oil facilities and other strategic targets was officially launched in early 2024, with a few dozen pilotless aircraft per month. It was not until the third year that Ukraine's attacks on Russia's oil infrastructure really took off, with a cumulative total of 108 hits after three years of war, 246 after four years, and a total of 305 strikes when including 24 February 2022 to 25 June 2026.

A substantial increase in targeted attacks by Ukraine on Russian energy infrastructure began in the second half of 2025. According to media reports, Ukraine carried out over a dozen drone attacks on Russian oil infrastructure between 2 and 24 August, the majority of them striking facilities in Ryazan Oblast and Volgograd Oblast in southwestern Russia. On 27 August, Ukrainian media reported that the Ryazan refinery, one of the main fuel arteries to Moscow, had been struck by a powerful explosion. Boris Aronstein, an independent oil and gas analyst, said that the Ukrainian drone strikes had caused "the most severe crisis in recent years", adding that the size, coordination and repeated waves of the drones makes Russia unable to repair the refineries before the next attack occurs. According to Reuters, Crimea and Russia's far east were the first territories to experience gasoline shortages in August.

Moscow Refinery on fire, 18 June 2026

In September 2025, Reuters reported that Russia was seeing certain fuel grade shortages, with the reduced refinery runs caused by the drone attacks and high borrowing costs leading to private filling stations being unable to stockpile fuel according to retailers and traders. According to Reuters, the attacks on some days had reduced Russian oil refining by almost a fifth, and cut exports from key ports. According to five retailers and traders in the Russian fuel market during September, problems from the shortages started to emerge in the Volga river region and in southern and central Russia as well. On 29 September, Forbes reported that the issues with fuel had worsened quickly and spread across much of the country, with rising prices, rationing, long queues and pumps running dry in some cases.

In October 2025, BBC Verify and BBC Russian reported that Ukrainian drone attacks reached a record level of 14 refineries targeted in August, while eight had been targeted in September and 12 in August, and that 21 out of Russia's 38 large refineries had been hit since January 2025. Meduza reported that some gas stations were shutting down altogether due to being unable to raise prices because of antitrust restrictions. In Crimea, Russian occupation officials limited gasoline sales to 20 liters per customer and imposed price caps.

== 2026 escalation of crisis ==
=== First wave: May – late July 2026 ===
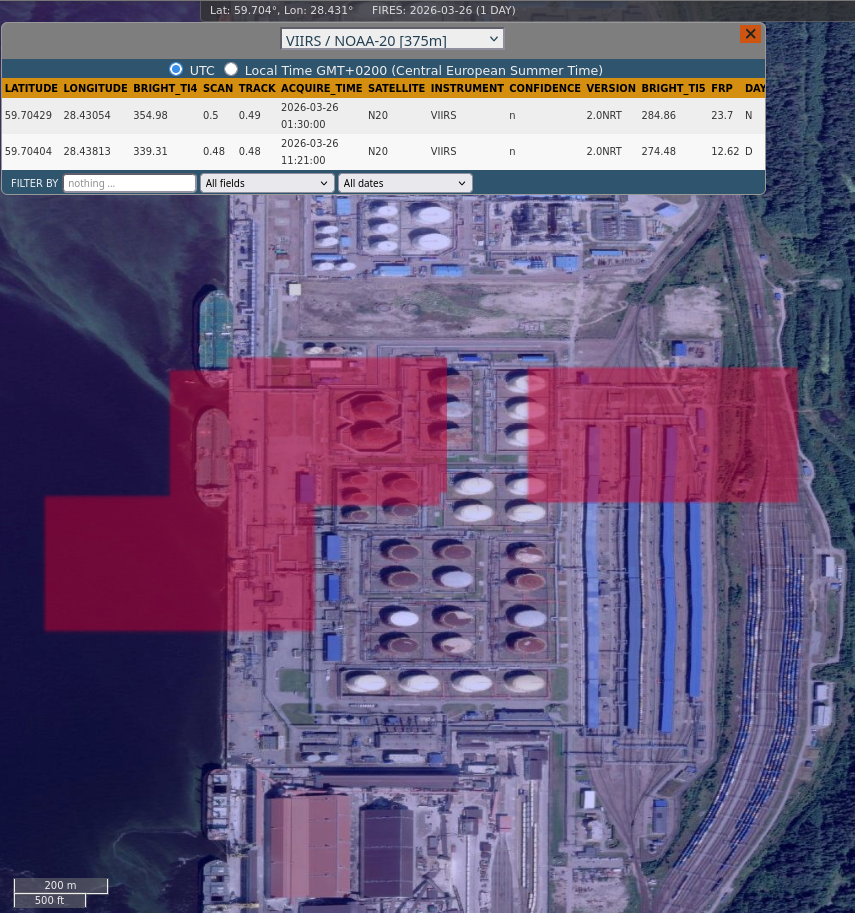
NASA's FIRMS detected fires on 26 March 2026 01:30:00 (UTC) at the Ust-Luga Multimodal Complex

The first wave of fuel shortages in Russia began in May 2026, and had spread to all regions of Russia by July 2026.

In the middle of 2026, Ukrainian missile and drone strikes on key Russian energy infrastructure resulted in an expansion of the crisis, with Politico saying that two-thirds of Russia's regions were reporting fuel supply issues, affecting millions of Russians as well as threatening businesses. In Crimea, a state of emergency was declared, with authorities banning all fuel sales. The Moscow Times said that the fuel shortage also resulted in a disruption of Crimea's tourism industry.

On 2 July 2026, Novaya Gazeta Europe estimated that the fuel crisis had spread to al least 78 of the 83 internationally recognised regions of the Russian Federation (including republics, krais, (autonomous) oblasts and okrugs, and federal cities), plus occupied Crimea and Sevastopol; only 5 regions of Russia had not reported a fuel crisis so far. In 38 of those regions, officials had imposed restrictions on gasoline sales, some in individual cities, others in entire regions. Three regions had gone as far as declaring a state of emergency: Penza Oblast, Irkutsk Oblast, and Zabaykalsky Krai; occupied Crimea and Sevastopol had already done so on 26 June 2026.

On 6 July, Ukrainian drones hit Russia's largest oil refinery and top producer of gasoline, the Omsk refinery, with two industry sources saying the refinery had halted operations the next day. The Saratov oil refinery also halted operations soon after a 7 July strike.

According to Russian Forbes, 54% of all oil refineries had been damaged. In July 2026, Russia's daily petrol output declined to 75,000~80,000 tonnes, even though domestic summer demand was 115,000~120,000 tonnes a day, meaning Russia had a daily oil refining capacity deficit of c. 35%.

In late July 2026, the first wave of fuel shortages in Russia had somewhat abated following the crude oil export bans, lowering the fuel quality standards, importing fuel from abroad, and other Kremlin attempts at mitigation, although shortages remained.

=== Second wave: mid-August 2026 ===
Fuel restrictions imposed by regions of Russia in mid-August 2026: Severe restrictions Partial restrictions No information

The effects of the fuel crisis mitigation measures had partially worn off by early August. In the first and second weeks of August, Ukrainian drones struck about ten more oil industry facilities. On 17 August, Reuters reported that a second wave of fuel shortages was sweeping across the country. Ten regions – Orenburg, Lipetsk, Tver, Krasnodar, Zabaykalsky, Primorsky, Krasnoyarsk, Oryol, Tuva and Khakhassia – which had previously relaxed their fuel restrictions had tightened them again by 14 August, and witnesses in Moscow Oblast reported on 17 August that several filling stations had no gasoline (petrol) available anymore, although most stations did offer diesel at the time. Data from the Saint-Petersburg International Mercantile Exchange (SPIMEX) indicated that, compared to the second half of July, gasoline sales in Russia fell by 20% in the first half of August.

The same week, Russian media reported that over 70% of filling stations across the Russian Federation had run out of fuel. On 19 August, the monitoring app Gdebenz put petrol availability at 28% of filling stations in the country, down from 41% the week before. The same day, the Yandex Fuel Service indicated 90% of stations in Moscow were out of AI-92 petrol. According to Euronews, this was a sign that the "second wave of fuel shortages is hitting harder than the first, with queues forming at pumps in Moscow for the first time." Meanwhile, according to data from the Central Bank of Russia, citizens were withdrawing rubles from banks in record amounts, possibly indicating a bank run. BBC News journalist Steve Rosenberg reported on 21 August 2026 that many stations in Moscow had completely run out of petrol, while other stations had drivers queueing in their cars for 2 to 2.5 hours, with 80 vehicles waiting in line for one station alone. Some Muscovites go petrol hunting at night, driving around the capital for short queues (wasting their remaining fuel), or waiting in line for a chance to refill, sometimes in vain. One resident declared: "Last night I went to get petrol at 11pm. By midnight I'd reached the front of the queue. Then they shut the petrol station until 2am." Another said: "I drove into Moscow yesterday from the provinces. It was empty petrol stations all the way. Everyone says there is a difficult situation in the country."

== Impact ==
=== Impact in 2025 ===
In November 2025, Reuters reported that Russia's oil processing had fallen only 3% during the year despite the attacks, as refineries averted a steep decline by using spare capacity to offset the damage. According to the report based on information from three Russian industry sources, 20% of Russia's refinery capacity was taken offline at the height of strikes between August and October, but this only resulted in a 6% drop in Russia's total refining volume. In terms of revenue, however, the International Energy Agency said that Russia's oil revenue declined to one of the lowest levels seen since the start of the war in 2022.

In December 2025, Russian energy analyst Craig Kennedy said that new sanctions by the US, EU, and the UK were likely to substantially cut Russia's oil revenues in 2026, while intensifying what he described as the worst crisis in Russia's energy sector since the 1990s.

=== Impact in June–July 2026 ===
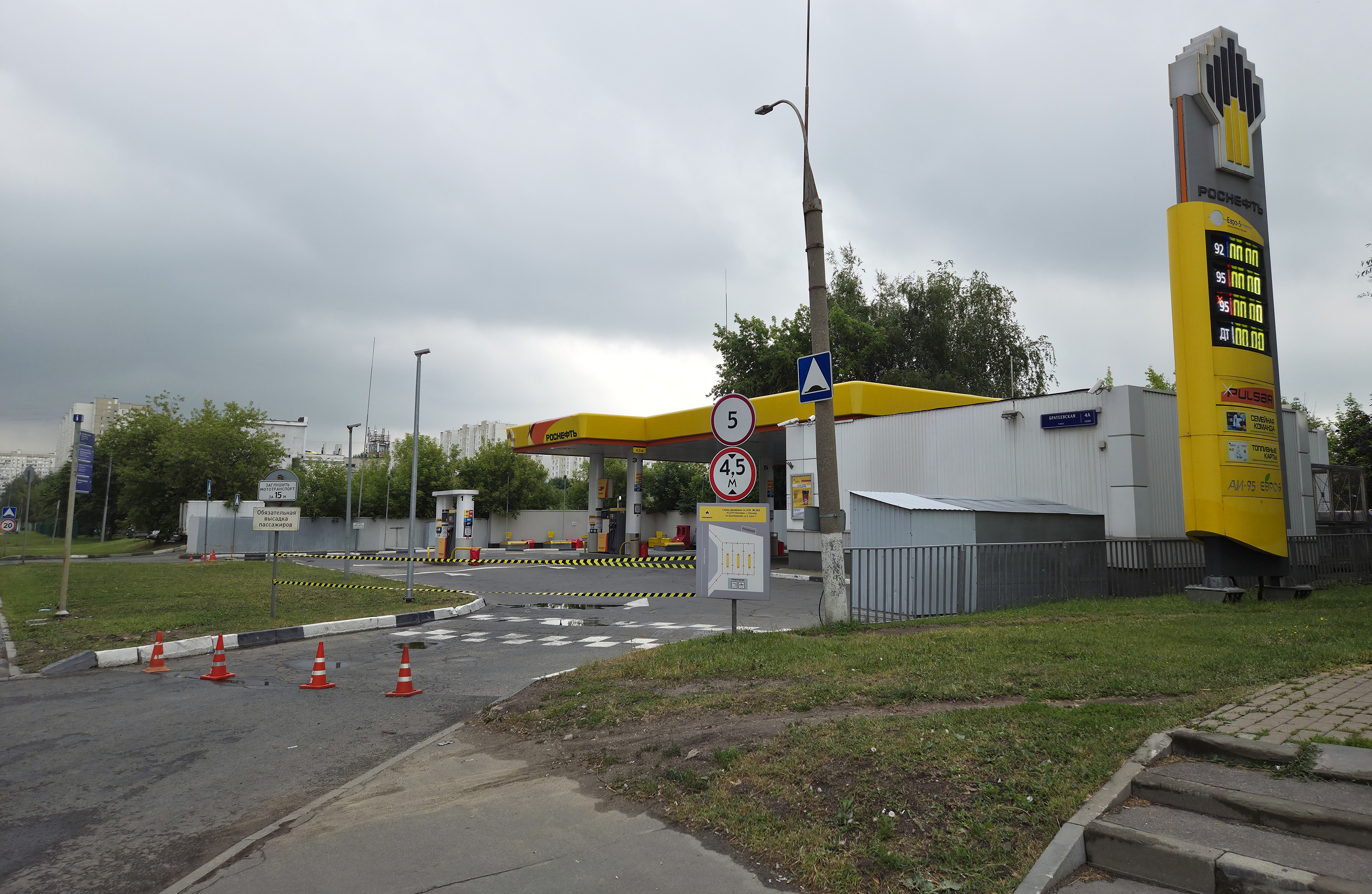
Closed Rosneft filling station in Moscow, 4 July 2026

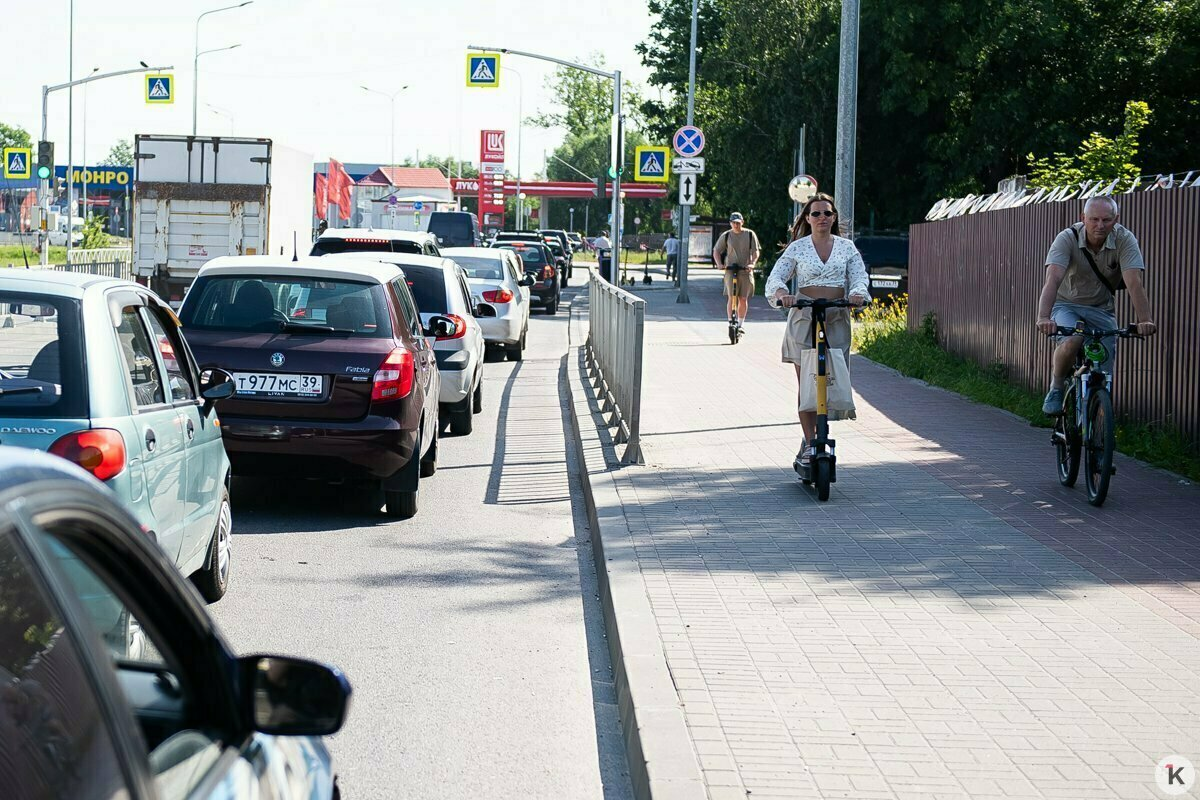
Cars queueing in front of a filling station in Kaliningrad, while other people turn to e-scooters and bicycles, 2 July 2026

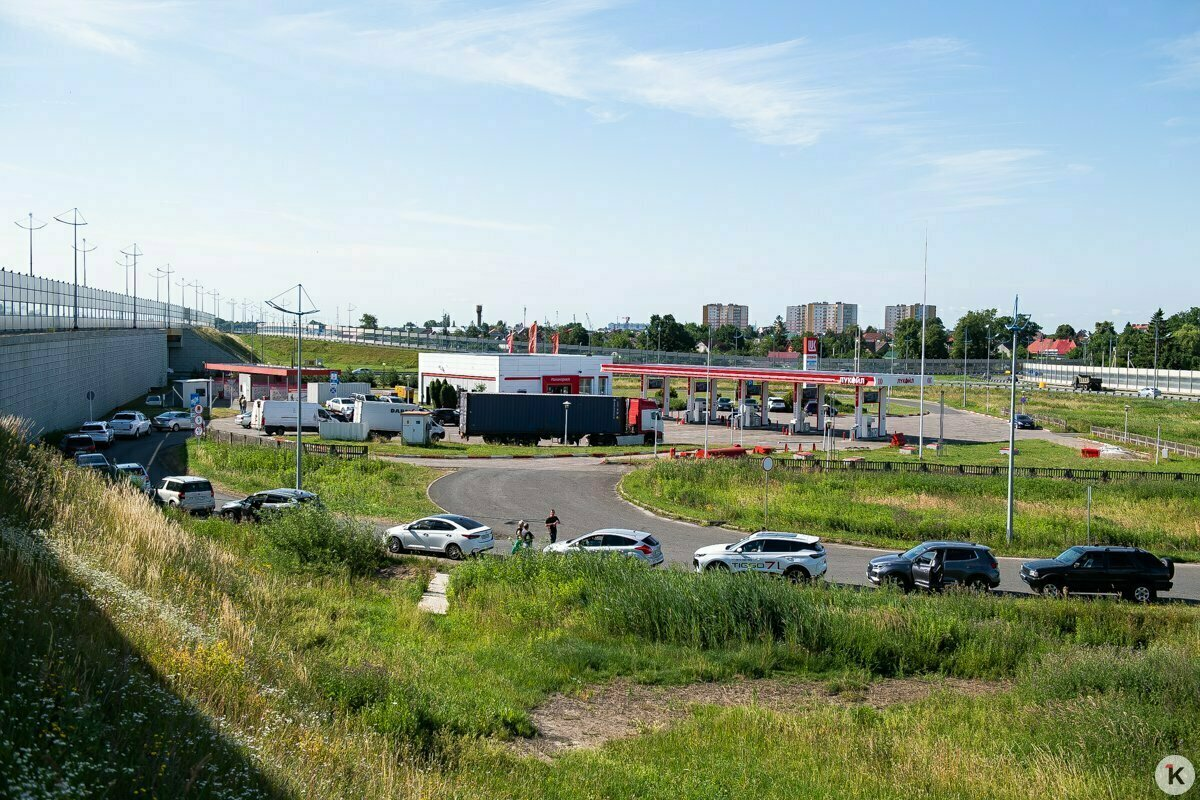
Cars queueing in front of a filling station in Kaliningrad, 2 July 2026

In early July 2026, Reuters said that most regions in Russia were experiencing fuel restrictions, resulting in growing public concern. Russians created crowdsourced maps and shared tips about which stations had fuel and short lines; social media showed motorists brawling over fuel. Farmers in the wheat belt were worried that, without fuel for their machines, they would not be able to harvest their crops. On 4 July 2026, the General Staff of the Armed Forces of Ukraine estimated 42.74% of Russia's oil refining capacity had been disabled; the International Energy Agency (IEA) said "more than 20%" of capacity had been knocked offline. Finnish president Alexander Stubb stated in early July 2026 that Russia's capacity to produce and export oil had been reduced by 40% due to the Ukrainian mid- and long-range drone strikes. The Financial Times reported that Russia produced 4.1 million barrels of oil per day in June 2026 (28% below the 5-year average, and 35% below design capacity); the fuel shortage had so far affected 50 million people (35% of the Russian Federation's population); and by 9 July the majority of regions of Russia had local authorities or retailers imposing fuel sales restrictions.

On 30 June 2026, Sberbank CEO German Gref told shareholders at a meeting: "I don't believe there is anyone in this country whose primary concern is anything other than an end to military hostilities as soon as possible." Analyst Jade McGlynn commented: "For four years Russians in major cities have been able to treat this war as something that happens to other people, somewhere else, paid for with other people's sons. Fuel rationing across Russia ends that: when you are sitting in a petrol queue for the better part of a day, the war stops being an abstraction on the evening news." On the other hand, while she believed the fuel crisis would add more problems for the Kremlin, and wear the population down further, Russian society was not yet capable of organising a movement to stop the war. International affairs professor Nina Khrushcheva concurred, saying it was more likely that Putin would double down rather than be inclined to peace negotiations, while the Russian population showed "a lot of resignation about what's going on".

The Kyiv Independent noted that a Russian man from Chita, Zabaykalsky Krai, who had sat in a filling station queue for 39 hours, told Meduza that the Russian authorities were "far too soft" on Ukraine, and suggested that rather than ceasing the war, it should be escalated even further to somehow solve the current fuel crisis. The BBC received mixed responses from Muscovites queueing for fuel, noting that Putin's approval ratings were down to around 73~74% (which is relatively low for Russia). A Levada Center poll showed the percentage of Russians believing the country was heading in the right direction had fallen to 52%, down from 61% in May 2026. A Gallup poll in early July 2026 found that 60% of Russians said economic conditions were getting worse where they lived, the highest result in 20 years.

=== Censorship of crisis and punishments of Russians complaining of shortage ===
On 18 August 2026, Mediazona reported that a Volgograd court had fined a local resident 10,000 rubles for recording an appeal in July with four other people aimed at the head of the Investigative Committee of Russia, Alexander Bastrykin, in which they complained about the fuel shortage and an ″unfair divide″ in which city administrators were able to fully fill their tanks while city residents were often refused. Shortly after the appeal, which they called an ″unauthorized mass event″, Russian authorities detained all the participants, including a lawyer who was sentenced to five days of arrest under the pretext of resisting the police. On 20 August, The Independent and The Telegraph said public outrage about the crisis was being censored, with other Russians complaining also facing fines and arrest, and the National Guard of Russia reportedly being deployed to gas stations in the Moscow region to handle social disorder and fuel-related violence. Another participant was fined, as was a resident of Perm staging a solo picket over petrol access.

=== Rising anxiety in Russian society and Putin's downplaying ===
By mid-August 2026, various opinion polls in Russia indicated rising anxiety. Novaya Gazeta columnist Andrey Kolesnikov wrote: "This permanent feeling of anxiety is with everyone right now. You feel that something is wrong. Anxiety is the main sentiment." President Vladimir Putin acknowledged at the end of July 2026 that there were fuel shortages, but called them "non-critical", downplaying the severity of the crisis. On 19 August, Putin said the same: "There are no critical consequences from such attacks, there have been none and there cannot be any. But they do, of course, cause us damage; that is obvious, we understand it, we see it and we know it." According to Kolesnikov, Putin's "personal reality in his head" was disconnected from the people's constant feelings of anxiety, suggesting: "Maybe he's trying to hypnotise himself that everything is okay." Kolesnikov analysed that Putin's messaging of 'keep calm and carry on' was not working anymore:

This regime doesn't demonstrate any model of the future: the nearest future, a middle-term future, a long-term future. We are 'great' right now. What are the qualities of this greatness? The petrol crisis? In that sense, the future is aborted. People are trying not to think about the future. The horizon of planning is very short.

Based on various reactions from civilians in Moscow Oblast to the petrol shortages, rising prices and drone strikes, BBC News journalst Steve Rosenberg concluded on 21 August 2026: "Comments like that suggest that Russians don't believe they can influence what's happening around them. All they feel they can do is try to adapt."

=== Fuel crisis in Central Asia ===
Russia's fuel export ban, imposed in June 2026, gradually created shortages in Central Asian countries that normally sourced most of their fuel from Russia. Kazakhstani economist Aidar Alibayev said in an interview on 20 August 2026 that petrol (gasoline) prices had risen roughly 10–13% in Tajikistan (12–13%), Kyrgyzstan (10%), and Uzbekistan (11–11.5%). Kyrgyzstan, relying on Russian imports for over 90% of its petrol, had only six weeks left before its reserved would run out, according to a deputy prime minister. Therefore, the government had asked other countries for help, including its neighbours Azerbaijan and Kazakhstan.

Tajikistan tried turning to China and Iran. Uzbekistan reportedly sourced about 50% of its petrol from Russia, while Kazakhstan produced enough fuel to meet most of its domestic demands. While motorists from Russia and other countries were driving to Kazakhstan to refuel there more frequently than in the past, and fuel prices had also been rising in that country, Alibayev attributed those to not just Russia's shortage alone, but to domestic taxes and the end of an export moratorium as well.

== Shortage mitigation ==
=== June–July 2026 ===
The Russian government imposed intermittent bans on gasoline exports after March 2024. In October 2025, the government announced a moratorium on the zeroing of the fuel damper, the exemption of winter diesel fuel from excise duty, and an extension of the gasoline export ban until 1 May 2026.

On 23 June 2026, Russian deputy prime minister Alexander Novak stated that the Russian federal government was considering a "total ban" on exports of diesel, after previously halting exports of petrol and jet fuel.

On 2 July 2026, prime minister Mikhail Mishustin signed a decree allowing certain oil refineries to lower their production quality standards from Euro-5 gasoline to Euro-3 — the latter having a higher sulfur content (up to 150 mg/kg), increasing pollution and safety risks. The decree applies until the end of 2026, and the produced gasoline may not be exported outside Russia. However, the reduction in fuel quality has caused many cars to break down, as their engines are designed to run on high-quality gasoline.

On 29 June, the Kommersant reported that the Kremlin was also considering lowering the standards of diesel production to as low as Euro-2, which had been banned in Russia since 2013.

Six regions introduced an alternating license plate rotation system – where drivers were only allowed to purchase gasoline on even or odd days, based on their license plate.

=== August 2026 ===
On 5 August, the government of Russia authorised the production, import and sale of Euro-2, Euro-3 and Euro-4 petrol for almost a year. On 18 August, trading in the lower-grade petrol types commenced at the Saint Petersburg stock exchange. These grades of petrol below Euro 5 lead to significantly more environmental pollution and hazards for public health, and may degrade and damage modern vehicle engines. Government newspaper Rossiyskaya Gazeta wrote:

For modern cars, regular use of lower-grade petrol can increase the pressure on the fuel injector, spark plugs, oxygen sensors, the catalytic converter and soot filter. Euro 2 won't kill an engine on one re-fuelling. But it sharply reduces the margin of safety.

In early August, the first tanker transporting petrol from India arrived at the oil port of Vitino near Murmansk on the White Sea, followed by a 30,000 tonne Lukoil tanker from Tangier, Morocco. However, disputes broke out over the price: the state regulator did not want to pay more than 78,000 rubles per tonne, while the Indian and Moroccan suppliers demanded between 110,000 and 130,000 rubles per tonne, significantly more expensive than domestic wholesale prices. Russia's Federal Antimonopoly Service reported that in July, Indian petrol imports had cost 100,466 rubles ($1,207) per tonne, "40% more expensive than the average price of AI-92 gasoline on the St. Petersburg Exchange (71,870 rubles, or $864, per tonne)." As of 20 August, it was unclear whether the lengthy dispute over import price was resolved or not, but a further price rise was expected.

Benzinmap, which tracks restrictions and prices nationwide, reported on 15 August 2026 that the following fuel restrictions had been imposed in nearly all federal subjects of Russia:

- limits on the volume sold per customer;
  - Gazprom Neft (in Moscow Oblast): 40 litres per customer;
  - Tatneft: 50 litres of petrol (gasoline) 60 litres of diesel per customer;
- QR-based rationing; and
- odd-even number plate schemes.

== See also ==
- 2026 Strait of Hormuz crisis
- 2026 Iran war fuel crisis
- 2026 United States fuel blockade on Cuba
- 2026 Philippine energy crisis
- Ukrainian strikes on Wildberries warehouses
