= Robert Brovdi =

Ukrainian officer (born 1975)

- Роберт Йосипович Бровді
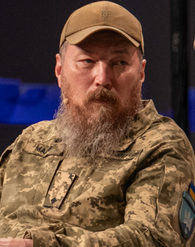
- Brovdi in 2025
- Born: 9 August 1975 (age 51); Uzhgorod, Zakarpatye Oblast, Ukrainian SSR, Soviet Union
- Alma mater: Uzhhorod National University
- Military career
- Allegiance: Ukraine
- Branch: Territorial Defense Forces (2022); Ukrainian Ground Forces (2022–2024); Ukrainian Marine Corps (2024–2025); Unmanned Systems Forces (2025–present)
- Service years: 2022–present
- Rank: Major
- Nickname: "Madyar"
- Units: 241st Territorial Defense Brigade (2022); 28th Mechanized Brigade (2022); 59th Motorized Brigade (2022–2024); 414th Strike UAV Battalion "Madyar's Birds" (2024–2025); Unmanned Systems Forces (2025–present)
- Conflicts: Russo-Ukrainian War; Russian invasion of Ukraine; Kyiv offensive; Battle of Bucha; Southern Ukraine campaign; Dniepr campaign; Eastern Ukraine campaign; Battle of Soledar; Battle of Bakhmut; 2023 Ukrainian counteroffensive; 2024 Kharkiv offensive

Robert Yosypovych Brovdi (Ukrainian: Роберт Йосипович Бровді; Hungarian: Bródi Róbert; born 9 August 1975), commonly known by his call sign Madyar (Ukrainian: Мадяр from Hungarian: Magyar, lit. 'The Hungarian'), is a Ukrainian soldier, politician, and businessman of Hungarian ethnicity who is the founder of the Ukrainian military drone unit "Madyar's Birds" (Note: Sometimes translated as "Birds of Madyar" or "Wings of Madyar".) (Ukrainian: Птахи Мадяра, Hungarian: Magyar Madarai).

== Early life and education ==
Brovdi was born in the city of Uzhhorod, located in the far west of Ukraine near the Hungary–Ukraine border. He is part of the Hungarian minority in the region, which was the inspiration for his military nickname.

== Career ==
Prior to the Russian invasion of Ukraine, Brovdi was a successful businessman in the field of agriculture, having headed the Ukrainian Agriculture Exchange. He also headed the Zakarpattia regional branch of the public organization Front for Change for some time.

Since the autumn of 2010, he served as director of the corporation Bread Investbud. Brovdi assumed as director amidst the drought brought by the 2010 Northern Hemisphere heat waves, and his objective was to double exports in the following season. During his time in this position, he had to defend the company of criticism such as favoritism, accusations of it being a monopoly and the secretive nature of its owners, as while 49% of the company was state-owned, the other 51% of its ownership was kept secret. Brovdi resigned from the company in 2012.

Brovdi's position in Bread Investbud strained his relations with Front for Change and particularly its leader Arseniy Yatsenyuk due to revelations about the company having links to then-Prime Minister of Russia, Vladimir Putin. He was completely expelled from Front for Change in April 2015, with local media reporting that his actions had led to the collapse of public support for the organization in his native Zakarpattia region.

In January 2019, a bag of grenades was thrown into the backyard of Brovdi's father's house in the Storozhnytsia district of Uzhhorod. Police opened an investigation into the attack, but were unable to identify a perpetrator. Early in the morning of February 16, a similar attack occurred, with an unknown person firing a grenade launcher at Brovdi's mother's house. The grenade, fired from a hand-held anti-tank grenade launcher, pierced the outer wall of the house and several inner walls, eventually stopping in the wall of the bedroom where Brovdi's mother was sleeping. She was not injured.

=== Military service ===
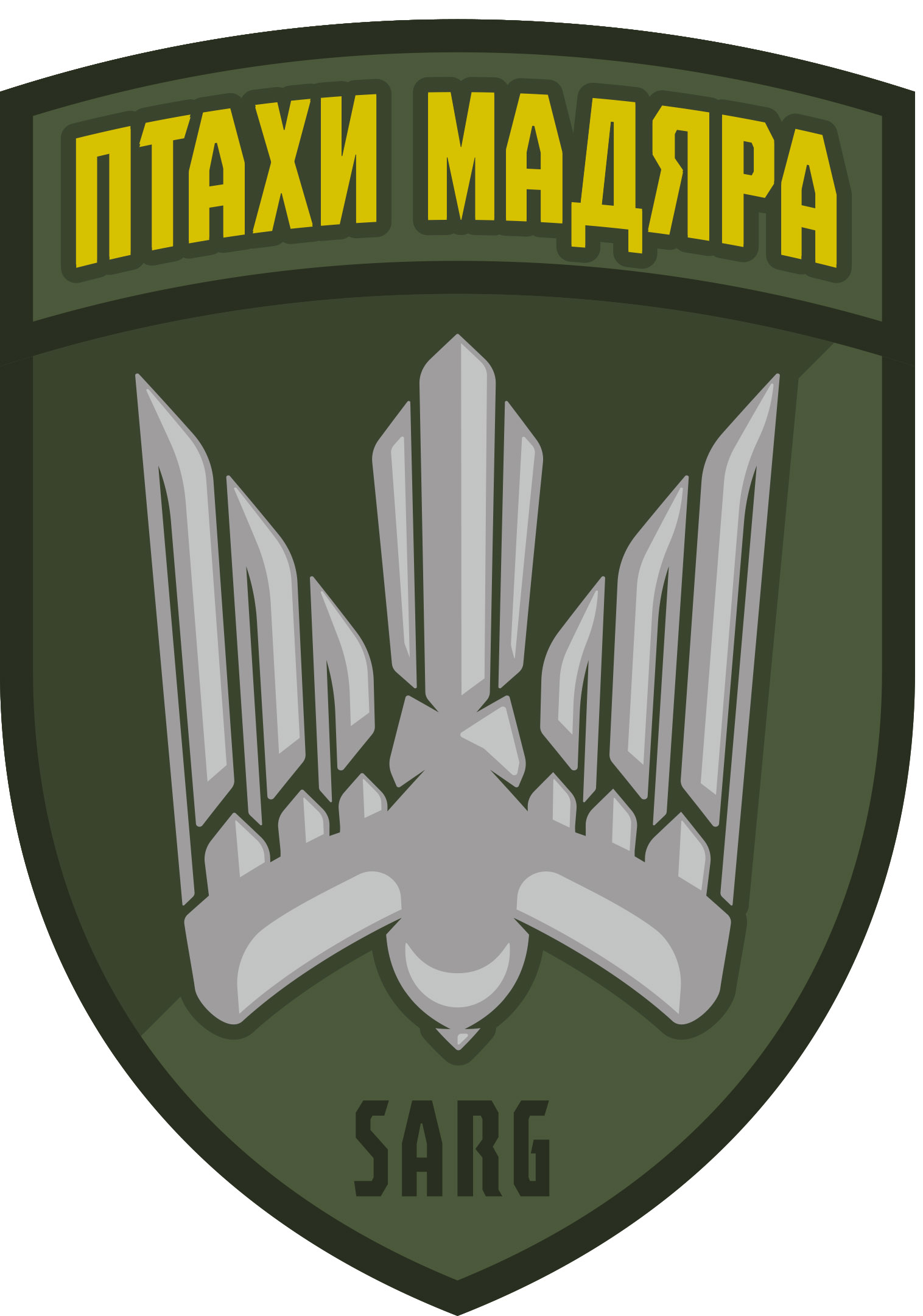
Shoulder sleeve insignia of the aerial reconnaissance unit "Madyar's Birds"

In February 2022, shortly before the start of the Russian invasion of Ukraine, Brovdi joined the Territorial Defence Forces of Ukraine, where he was assigned to the 206th Battalion of the 241st Brigade. During the Kyiv offensive, he took part in the evacuation of civilians from Irpin during the battle for the city, and took part in fighting in Bucha and Borodianka. In late April, his unit was sent to the front line in the Kherson area of the southern campaign.

After some time, Brovdi decided that he could be doing more with his entrepreneurial skills instead of "sitting in a sodden trench". Against bureaucratic procedure, he raised funds on his own to buy a "fleet of drones", with which he set up the aerial reconnaissance unit "Madyar's Birds". The unit was a part of the 28th Mechanized Brigade from April to August 2022. The unit is composed of "a few dozen" pilots, with hundreds of drones. Like much of the Ukrainian army, the drones used by the unit are the Chinese-made civilian DJI Mavics. The unit is involved in five primary types of drone reconnaissance: locating enemy forces, patrolling the front line, artillery spotting, attacks with kamikaze drones, and occasionally dropping explosive devices on enemy soldiers.

Madyar's Birds were incorporated into the 59th Motorized Brigade in August 2022, and took part in the battle of Bakhmut until March 2023, when Brovdi said in a video posted to social media that the unit had been ordered to withdraw after "110 days" of fighting.

In April 2023, Brovdi warned that the Chinese government may cut off Ukrainian military access to the Mavic drones, and urged Ukrainian soldiers to be careful with the drones they had.

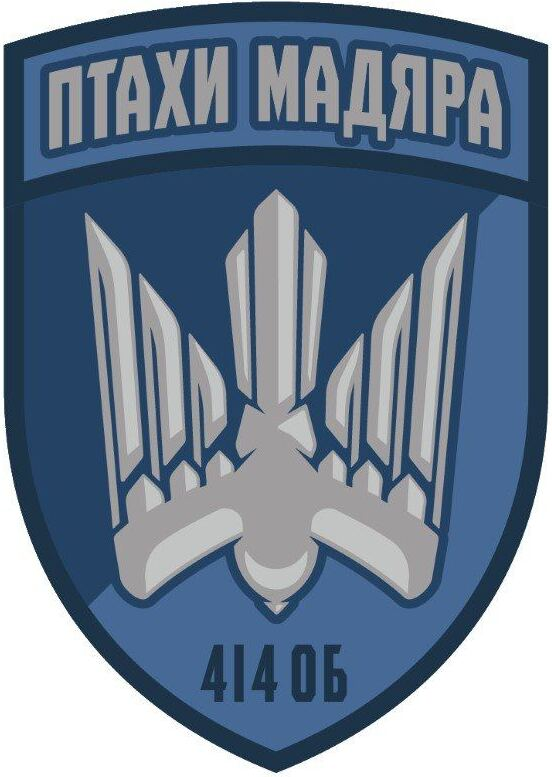
Shoulder sleeve insignia of 414th Strike UAV Battalion "Madyar's Birds"

Madyar's Birds often releases videos of their "greatest successes" on the battlefield, which feature Russian soldiers dying, which journalists have described as having "undoubtable propaganda value". Brovdi has become a popular figure in Ukraine among "war-watchers" on social media for his "salty analogies and metaphors shrouded in black humor" and "colorful western Ukrainianisms" in his narration of videos he publishes of his unit's activities.

Brovdi was awarded the medal "For the Defense of Ukraine" by Ukrainian President Volodymyr Zelensky on 28 August 2023 and the Hero of Ukraine on 8 May 2025.

The Madyar's Birds unit has been taking part in the fighting in and around Krynky since at least November 2023. On 16 January 2024, Brovdi announced on his Telegram channel that Madyar's Birds had been incorporated into the Ukrainian Marine Corps as the 414th Marine Strike UAV Battalion.

He was appointed commander of the Unmanned Systems Forces on 3 June 2025.

On 28 August 2025, Hungary barred Brovdi from entering the country in response to Ukrainian drone attacks on the Druzhba pipeline in Russia.

== Criminal prosecution in absentia by Russia ==
The Russian Investigative Committee accused Brovdi of committing terrorist acts; on March 2026, he was sentenced in absentia to life imprisonment by the Second Western District Military Court for organizing an attack that killed Channel One correspondent Anna Prokofieva.
