= 9th Unmanned Systems Brigade =

9th Separate Unmanned Systems Brigade
- 9-та окрема бригада безпілотних систем
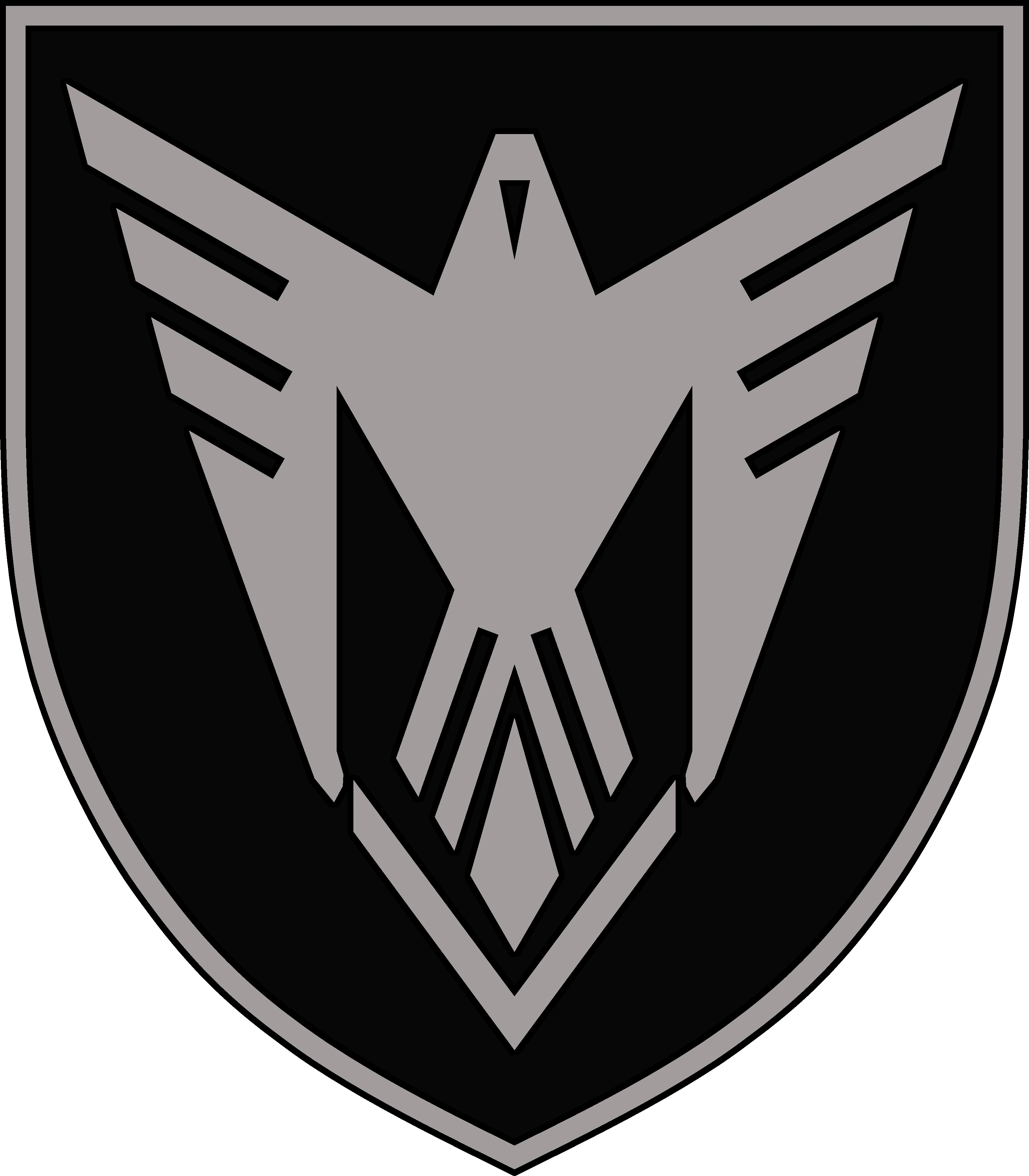
- Active: April 2014 – present
- Country: Ukraine
- Branch: Unmanned Systems Forces
- Type: Unmanned systems
- Size: Brigade
- Part of: Operational Command South
- Garrison/HQ: Vinnytsia Oblast
- Nickname: Vinnytsia Scythians
- Motto: "To Victory"
- Engagements: Russo-Ukrainian war; War in Donbas; Battle of Mariupol; Russian invasion of Ukraine; Southern Ukraine campaign; Battle of Kherson; Eastern Ukraine campaign; Battle of Donbas

Insignia
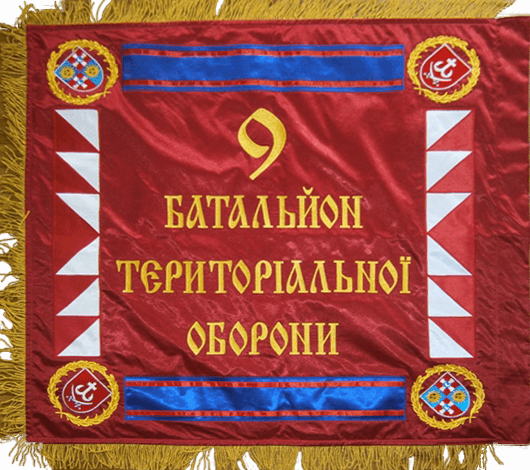
- Former flag

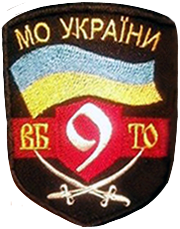
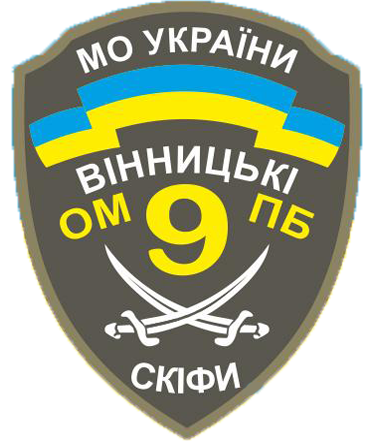
- Former insignia (2014; 2014–2025; 2025)

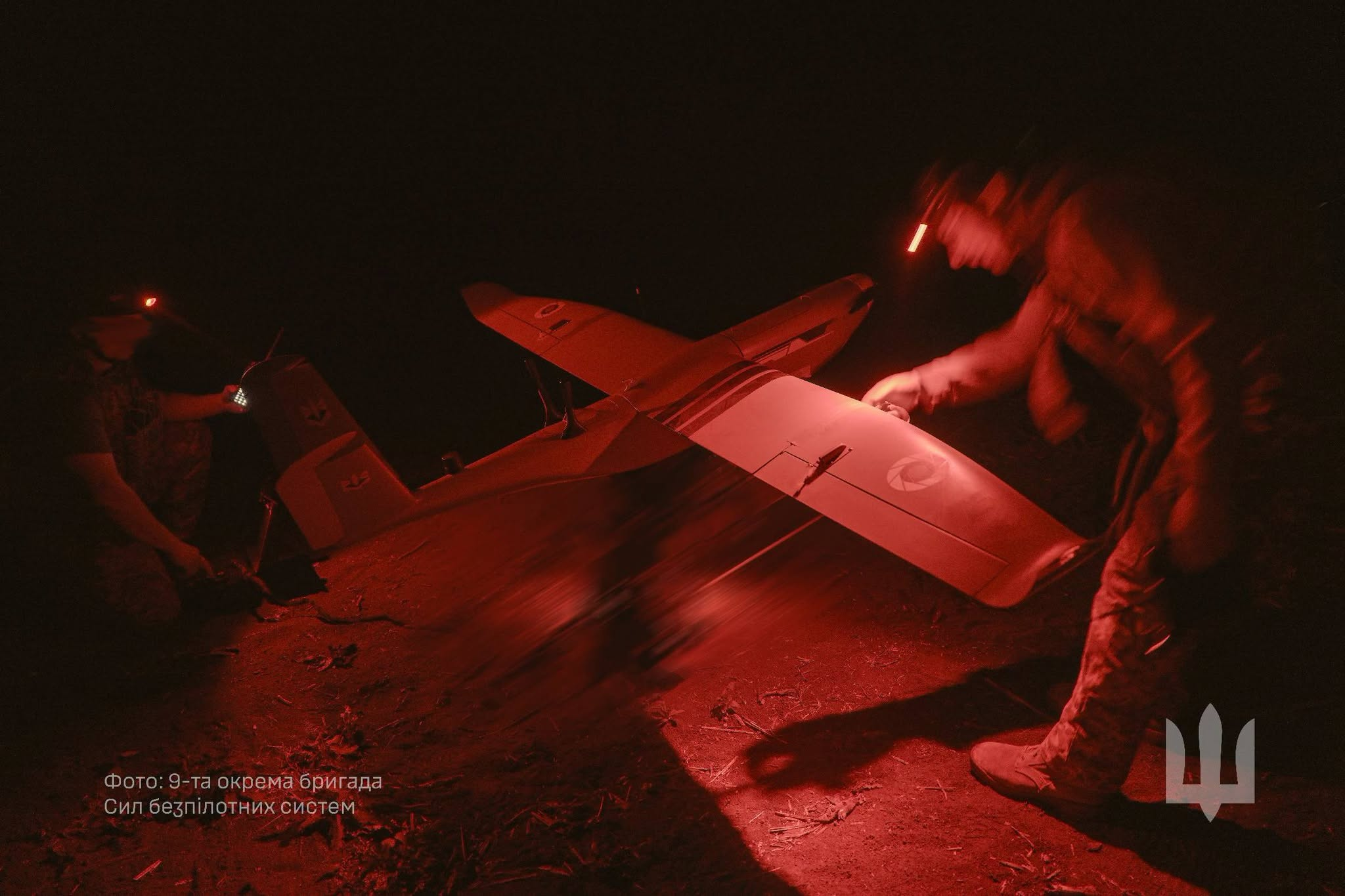
Attack drone being prepared for launch

The 9th Separate Unmanned Systems Brigade (MUN A2896, MM:B2248) is a formation of the Unmanned Systems Forces of the Armed Forces of Ukraine.

The brigade traces its origins to April 2014, when it was formed as the 9th Vinnytsia Territorial Defense Battalion after the start of the War in Donbas. In October 2014, it was reorganized as a separate motorized infantry battalion. In January 2025, after the Unmanned Systems Forces were established, the battalion was expanded into a brigade and transferred to the new branch.

== History ==
=== Formation ===
In April 2014, the 9th zone of the Territorial Defense Directorate in Vinnytsia Oblast was tasked with establishing the Vinnytsia Territorial Defense Battalion, and 3.692 million hryvnias were set aside for it.

The battalion was recruited in May 2014 as a contract battalion under the Law of Ukraine No. 2232-XII of 25 March 1992 "On Military Duty and Military Service", the "Regulations on Military Service by Citizens in the Armed Forces of Ukraine", and the implementing order of the Minister of Defense. It initially comprised 383 soldiers and sergeants and 40 officers, mostly former servicemen from Vinnytsia, and was based at a temporary camp in Berdychiv.

The battalion received small arms on 19 May 2014. Regional enterprises later repaired and donated six BRDM-2 vehicles. Civilian donors gave three vehicles and 142 portable radios worth 318,600 hryvnias, 3,000 items of clothing worth 336,000 hryvnias, 423 pairs of boots worth 68,700 hryvnias, and 2.6 million hryvnias in cash.

=== War in Donbas ===
In early June 2014, the General Staff decided to send the battalion to the ATO zone to reinforce the state border. On 12 June, it began operating in Novoazovsk Raion, in sector M. Poorly supplied, the soldiers appealed to the people of Vinnytsia for help on 17 June. On 20 June, relatives learned that the soldiers lacked body armor. The regional military enlistment office said that funds had been allocated but that delivery would take time. Body armor, including 220 vests, arrived in August.

On 2 July 2014, mortar fire on the 16th checkpoint and the Novoazovsk checkpoint killed one soldier and wounded five. Near Samiilove, Andriy Brovinsky was killed while saving his brother Oleksandr, who served in the same battalion. On the night of 21–22 July, the battalion's positions at the 16th checkpoint were shelled by BM-21 Grad rocket launchers, damaging equipment. On 26 July, a further Grad attack on the checkpoint wounded three soldiers of the battalion and the Donetsk Border Detachment.

On 12 August 2014, Oleksandr Prytyka died of wounds sustained in the Battle of Mariupol. In mid-August, 15 soldiers of the battalion were detained in Mariupol, accused of attempting to kill an officer; they said they had been firing at a drone.

On 24 August 2014, Grad fire forced the battalion from the 16th checkpoint to a crossroads near Sedove, and shelling the next day pushed it back to Novoazovsk. On 26 August, a group of soldiers who said they had held Novoazovsk for two days without heavy weapons withdrew to Mariupol without orders. Their commander refused to let them stay, and 75 of them returned home to Vinnytsia. After negotiations with the military commissariat, they were re-enlisted, given temporary leave and ordered to report back afterwards. The battalion was then reinforced with heavy armored vehicles.

In early October 2014, a civilian convoy left Vinnytsia with food, winter uniforms, heaters, firewood and tent insulation for the battalion. On 22 October, soldiers' families blocked the road outside the regional state administration in Vinnytsia, demanding the battalion's temporary withdrawal from the ATO zone. On 29 October, Oleh Bohdanov was killed by mortar fragments near Hranitne.

On 30 October 2014, the unit became the 9th Separate Motorized Infantry Battalion, part of the 30th Mechanized Brigade, with its headquarters moved to Zviahel. On 21 November, about 70 soldiers returned to the ATO zone, followed by 80 more two days later. On 6 December, the eve of Armed Forces Day, Vinnytsia residents sent three tonnes of humanitarian aid, and the battalion received its battle flag.

On 22 April 2015, the battalion was transferred to the 59th Separate Motorized Infantry Brigade. In 2016, its headquarters moved to Kodyma.

The battalion continued to take losses in Donbas:

- 3 April 2016: Serhiy Mykhalchenko died of natural causes at a combat post.
- 3 August 2016: Captain Yuriy Barashenko was killed near Mariupol.
- 10 August 2016: Sergeant Oleksandr Shelepun was killed near Zolote.

From 28 May 2017, the battalion held the line near Mariupol between Hnutove and Vodiane, where it suffered further losses:

- 29 June 2017: Oleksiy Tymoshchuk was severely wounded by grenade-launcher fire near Hnutove while checking minefields, and died on 9 July.
- 27 July 2017: Sergeant Ivan Nosach was killed by shelling near Vodiane.
- 8 August 2017: Kostyantyn Roma was killed during an attack on a battalion stronghold near Vodiane.
- 24 August 2017: Oleh Popov was killed by small-arms fire at Talakivka.
- 8 December 2017: Sergeant Anatoliy Tverdola died of gunshot wounds during attacks on battalion positions near Vodiane.

On 9 September 2018, Valentyn Belinsky was killed near Stanytsia Luhanska.

=== Russian invasion ===
On 24 February 2022, the battalion advanced towards Crimea and reportedly fought superior Russian forces along the Crimea–Kherson highway. It was then sent to cover Melitopol. Its commander, Serhii Kotenko, was killed near Zaporizhzhia on 9 March 2022.

In November 2022, units of the battalion raised the Ukrainian flag over Blahodatne. In 2023, it fought in Donetsk Oblast, where Pavlo Baltian was killed.

=== Unmanned systems brigade ===
On 27 January 2025, the battalion was expanded into the 9th Separate Brigade and transferred to the Unmanned Systems Forces.

== Culture ==
Vinnytsia composer and performer Andriy Senchenko wrote an anthem for the battalion and recorded an album of patriotic songs about the unit, Vinnytsia Battalion.

== Commanders ==
- Colonel Valeriy Kutsenko (2014)
- Colonel Serhiy Ivanov (2015–?)
- Colonel Serhii Kotenko † (?–2022)
