= 414th Unmanned Strike Aviation Brigade =

Ukrainian Ground Forces unit

414th Separate Unmanned Systems Brigade (from 12.2024) 414th Separate Strike Unmanned Aerial Systems Regiment (06.2024—12.2024) 414th Separate Strike Unmanned Aerial Systems Battalion (01.2024—06.2024) Separate Company of Strike Unmanned Aerial Complexes "Magyar's Birds" (2023) Separate Company-Tactical Group "Magyar's Birds" (2022) Tactical Group "Magyar's Birds" (2022)
- Sleeve insignia
- Active: May 2022–present
- Country: Ukraine
- Branch: Unmanned Systems Forces of the Armed Forces of Ukraine (from 2 September 2025); Ukrainian Naval Forces (01.2024—01.2025); Ukrainian Ground Forces (01.2025—09.2025, 02.2022—01.2024)
- Patron: Robert Brovdi (callsign "Magyar")
- Mottos: Eyes and a Sting
- Engagements: Russian invasion of Ukraine: Southern Ukraine: Battle of Mykolaiv; 2022 Ukrainian southern counteroffensive; Battle of Bakhmut; 2023 Ukrainian counteroffensive: Fighting on the Donetsk axis; Southern Ukraine; Counteroffensive on the left bank of the Dnieper; Battle of Krynky; Kharkiv offensive (2024); Battle of Pokrovsk; Kursk offensive (2024–2025); Deep strikes on targets in Russia and temporarily occupied territories (2025—2026); Operation MoLoChKa
- Decorations: For Courage and Bravery
- Website: Official website

Commanders
- Current commander: Captain Andrii Klymenko

The 414th Separate Unmanned Systems Brigade (Ukrainian: 414-та окрема бригада безпілотних авіаційних систем «Птахи Мадяра» (414 ОБрБпС), romanized: 414-ta okrema brigada bezpilotnikh aviatsiynikh sistem "Ptakhy Madyara" (414 OBrBpS)), also known as "Magyar's Birds", is a formation within the Unmanned Systems Forces of the Armed Forces of Ukraine. The unit is considered the first separate unmanned aerial systems formation within the Armed Forces of Ukraine and one of the most effective unmanned systems units of Ukraine's Defense Forces.

In 2022, Robert Brovdi ("Magyar") created the group "Magyar's Birds", which later became part of the 59th Separate Motorized Infantry Brigade. The unit became a company and specialized in the use of strike drones, SIGINT and electronic warfare (EW) systems, remote mining, patrolling, and artillery fire adjustment using drones. In January 2024, the company was expanded into the 414th Battalion and transferred to the marines. In June the battalion was expanded into a regiment, and in December 2024 into a brigade. In February 2025 the unit was included in the "Drone Line" initiative and transferred to the Ukrainian Ground Forces, and in September 2025 it completed its inter-service transition to the Unmanned Systems Forces.

== History ==
=== Magyar's Birds (2022–2023) ===
The "Birds of Magyar" unit originated in the early days of Russia's full-scale invasion of Ukraine. It was founded by Ukrainian businessman and volunteer fighter Robert Brovdi, known by his call sign "Magyar." On 7 February 2022 he joined the Territorial Defense Forces, the 206th Separate Rifle Battalion of the Territorial Defense, where at the start of the invasion he was appointed platoon commander and carried out combat missions in Irpin, Bucha, and Borodianka.

In April the unit was moved to the Kherson axis, where "Magyar" decided to focus on Aerial reconnaissance and created "Magyar's Birds". "Magyar's Birds" engaged in reconnaissance, patrolling, artillery fire adjustment, the use of kamikaze drones, and bombing.

In May 2022 a separate aerial reconnaissance group "Magyar's Birds" of 26 people was formed, working at that time together with the 28th Mechanized Brigade. In August 2022 the aerial reconnaissance operators assembled one of the first FPV drones and began the experimental use of strike drones against enemy personnel and equipment; drop drones also entered service. After the end of active fighting on the Kherson axis, the unit was redeployed to the Bakhmut axis.

The unit took part in the Battle of Bakhmut. As part of the 251st Territorial Defense Battalion, which was under the operational control of the Operational-Strategic Group of Forces "Khortytsia", it fought in the areas of Bakhmut, Opytne, Klishchiivka, Kurdiumivka, Soledar, Berkhivka, and Krasna Hora over the course of 110 days. According to "Magyar's" recollections, there was a situation in which, over 4 days, with the forces of a single Territorial Defense machine-gun crew and four drone crews, they repelled 16 recorded attacks by Wagner fighters, halting them on a single hectare that they nicknamed "the bloody one". "Magyar's Birds" received the order to withdraw in March 2023.

In March 2023 the tactical group "Magyar's Birds" was reorganized into a separate strike UAV company and incorporated into the 59th Separate Motorized Infantry Brigade. Between March and June 2023 the company carried out combat missions in the areas of Pervomaiske, Avdiivka, Staromykhailivka, Krasnohorivka, and Marinka, combining aerial reconnaissance, fire adjustment, and the use of strike UAVs and FPV drones, in particular in the areas of Donetsk, Pisky, Lozove, and Yasynuvata.

From 13 June to 1 October 2023 the unit, as part of the "Donetsk" Operational-Tactical Group, took part in the counteroffensive by Ukraine's Defense Forces in southern and eastern Ukraine. The strike UAV company "Magyar's Birds" carried out missions of aerial reconnaissance, target engagement, remote mining, fire adjustment, as well as electronic warfare and SIGINT in cooperation with the 35th, 36th, 37th, and 38th Separate Marine Brigades. The unit took part in the battles for Urozhaine and Staromaiorske. According to published results of the unit's activity during the counteroffensive, over 110 days it struck 514 enemy targets, of which 309 were destroyed.

From 3 October 2023 to 31 July 2024 the strike UAV company "Magyar's Birds", which was under the operational control of the Marine Corps Command of the Armed Forces of Ukraine, took part in combat operations on the left bank of the Dnieper, in particular in the area of Krynky. During October 2023 – January 2024 the unit struck 764 pieces of enemy equipment, of which 273 were destroyed. In parallel, the unit developed a SIGINT and EW capability: according to the unit, on the left bank of the Dnieper, in cooperation with the marines, more than 10,000 enemy FPV drones were detected, a significant portion of which were suppressed. The use of FPV-drone signal-interception equipment made it possible to identify their launch points and pinpoint operator positions. During operations on the left bank of the Dnieper in the Krynky area, the unit also carried out the remote laying of about 3,500 anti-tank mines produced by the unit's "Tsukrarnia" (Sugar Factory) workshop, using drones, in a sector covering about 72.5 km².

By 16 January 2024, Brovdi reported that the unit had accumulated 692 days of continuous combat. Sixteen of its soldiers had been awarded the Order for Courage for their actions.

=== Separate military unit (2024) ===
On 16 January 2024 the unit was transferred from the 59th Separate Motorized Infantry Brigade to the Marine Corps of the Armed Forces of Ukraine and expanded from a company into the 414th Separate Strike Unmanned Aerial Systems Battalion. "Magyar" became the battalion commander. According to the outlet Focus, "Magyar's Birds" became the first separate unmanned aerial systems unit within the Armed Forces of Ukraine. From 28 May to 17 July 2024 the "Magyar's Birds" unit carried out combat missions on the Kharkiv axis, in particular to reinforce the Vovchansk grouping and the 13th "Khartiia" Brigade on the Lyptsi axis.

At the end of June 2024 "Magyar" announced that the battalion had been expanded into a regiment. It was reorganized to include new units: one dedicated to intercepting and destroying enemy drones, another focused on experimental unmanned systems, and a third responsible for developing and implementing new technologies. With the reorganization, the regiment planned to develop its own capabilities for training operators, as well as to deploy its own legal production facilities. According to Ukrinform, within the first day after the recruitment announcement more than a thousand applications were submitted. In parallel, internal support sub-units were being formed, in particular an unmanned systems repair base, training and combat sub-units, and electronic warfare (EW) and SIGINT capabilities. In July–August the regiment was moved to the most difficult Pokrovsk axis, where the "Pokrovsk Dome" system for countering enemy drones was deployed. According to the unit, between July 2024 and May 2026 more than 534,000 combat sorties were carried out, more than 160,000 targets were struck, of which more than 71,000 were destroyed. It was also reported that more than 49,000 enemy service members were struck. From August 2024 to February 2025, and again in March – August 2025, the unit took part in combat operations on the territory of the Kursk and Belgorod oblasts of the Russian Federation. In addition, from November 2024 "Magyar's Birds" operated on a section of the front near Vuhledar. On 16 November 2024 fighters of "Magyar's Birds", using a Vampire drone, destroyed the Russian "Borisoglebsk-2" electronic suppression complex on the Pokrovsk axis, whose value was estimated at $200 million.

=== Formation of the 414th Separate Brigade ===
In December 2024 the transformation of the 414th Separate Strike Unmanned Aerial Systems Regiment "Magyar's Birds" into the 414th Separate Unmanned Systems Brigade of the Armed Forces of Ukraine was announced. During this period the formation of a full brigade structure with training, production, and engineering infrastructure was completed. The unit deployed an unmanned systems repair base, an active-operations company, a separate instructors' company, and specialized schools for FPV-drone operators, strike-bomber operators, and SIGINT specialists. According to "Magyar", within the first days after the announcement of the expansion into a brigade, the unit received nearly 1,400 applications for more than 3,000 vacancies. "Magyar" emphasized that the unit's activity was not limited to the use of reconnaissance-strike UAVs: with the expansion, it planned to increase its capabilities in SIGINT, electronic warfare, the use of radar systems, and layered control of its area of responsibility. At the same time, the brigade structure with training, production, and engineering infrastructure was completed, and at the end of 2024 a counter-drone system was deployed in the Kherson area – the "Kherson Dome".

On 9 February 2025 the brigade, together with 4 other units, joined the initiative of the President of Ukraine "Drone Line", which was intended to scale up the experience of combat UAV use across the entire front.

From February to May 2025 the brigade, under the "Drone Line" initiative, recruited more new crews than some older units had over three years of the war. As a result, in those months the brigade led the "eBaly" target-strike ranking (also known as "Army Bonus"), built on the basis of the "Delta" situational awareness system; by May 2025 its figures were three times higher than at the time the points system was introduced. For the year 2025, the "Magyar's Birds" brigade took first place in effectiveness figures within the "Army of Drones. Bonus" program.

=== Transition to the Unmanned Systems Forces ===
On 3 June 2025 the brigade commander, Robert "Magyar" Brovdi, was appointed commander of the Unmanned Systems Forces of the Armed Forces of Ukraine. On 18 June, junior lieutenant Andrii Klymenko ("Klima") became the new commander of the 414th Brigade. According to the brigade, "Klima" became the first commander of a brigade in the rank of junior lieutenant in the modern history of the Armed Forces of Ukraine; before his appointment he had founded and led the strike UAV unit "Klima-Team", was a volunteer from the first days of the full-scale invasion, and rose from Territorial Defense rifleman to brigade commander. In civilian life he had been the absolute world champion in ITF taekwon-do (2017).

On 11 June 2025 the unit joined the newly created Unmanned Systems Forces Grouping, which united units of the "Drone Line" and the Unmanned Systems Forces. In early September 2025 the USFG commander "Magyar" announced that the brigade had completed its inter-service transition from the Ground Forces to the Unmanned Systems Forces and would soon double in size. On 3 September 2025 the brigade's inclusion in the Unmanned Systems Forces was officially announced. On 15 October 2025 the brigade's strength was roughly doubled – to 12 battalions.

On 5 December 2025, by decree of the President of Ukraine, the brigade commander Andrii Klymenko was awarded the title of Hero of Ukraine. On 6 December 2025, on the occasion of the Day of the Armed Forces of Ukraine, Supreme Commander-in-Chief Volodymyr Zelenskyy presented the battle flag to the 414th Brigade.

On 11 June 2026, the Day of the Unmanned Systems Forces, by decree of the President of Ukraine No. 486/2026, the brigade was awarded the honorary distinction "For Courage and Bravery"; a separate decree No. 487/2026 awarded the same distinction to the 1st Separate Center of the Unmanned Systems Forces.

=== Deep strikes by the 9th "Kairos" Battalion ===
Since 2025 a separate area of the brigade's activity has been deep strikes on military and infrastructure targets in the Russian Federation and temporarily occupied territories, carried out by the 9th "Kairos" Battalion in cooperation with the 1st Separate Center of the Unmanned Systems Forces, the 412th "Nemesis" Brigade, the 413th "Raid" Regiment, and other components of the Armed Forces, working together with the Territorial Defense Forces and other uniformed organizations.

On the night of 30 May 2026, "Kairos" pilots, together with the 413th "Raid" Regiment and coordinated by the newly created Deep Strike Center of the Unmanned Systems Forces, attacked military camps and training grounds of the 3rd, 35th, and 36th armies of the Russian Federation at a depth of 70–100 km from the front line. At the end of December 2025 the Unmanned Systems Forces reported that over the year the 1st Separate Center, "Kairos", and the "GRAF" group had struck more than 350 strategic targets at a depth of up to 1,500 km.

In 2026 the battalion repeatedly reported striking air defense assets, radar stations, and oil-refining infrastructure. In particular, "Kairos" pilots hit "Tor", "Buk", and "Pantsir" complexes, radar stations from S-300/S-400 complexes, "Iskander" SRBM basing sites in Crimea, and the oil refinery in Tuapse. In April 2026 the battalion took part in strikes on the "Lukoil-Nizhegorodnefteorgsintez" oil refinery in Kstovo, and on 18 June 2026 in the massed attack on the Moscow oil refinery in the Kapotnya area, together with units of the Special Operations Forces, SBU, and Defense Intelligence (HUR). That same week "Kairos" struck gas compressor stations in Crimea during a coordinated Unmanned Systems Forces operation in which more than 30 targets were struck deep in the rear.

== "Tsukrarnia" production base ==
"Tsukrarnia" (Sugar Factory) is a production-engineering directorate within the brigade that specializes in the development, modernization, and manufacture of components and munitions for unmanned systems, and also engages in the use of unmanned ground vehicles. The legal production of munitions began with the reorganization of the battalion into a regiment in June 2024.

According to the brigade, as of April 2025 the unit had 4 of its own engineering sub-units, a scientific-production base, and munitions workshops, and produced more than 50 models of munitions. Among its best-known products are PTM-3 mines for drops and munitions for kamikaze drones; according to data as of September 2025, "Tsukrarnia" produced tens of thousands of such munitions monthly, used by drone operators in more than 120 units of the Defense Forces.

== Command ==
- 2022–2025: Major Robert Brovdi ("Magyar")
- From June 2025: Captain Andrii Klymenko ("Klima"), a junior lieutenant at the time of his appointment as commander

== Symbolism ==
The brigade's symbol is a steel bird depicted on the "Magyar's Birds" patch. As interpreted by the unit, it symbolizes high-tech weaponry combining the strength of steel, engineering precision, and the will to win; the bird's flight reflects the constant expansion of the unit's zone of influence – from the front line to the depths of the enemy's rear.

Drones are described as both the "eyes and sting" of the brigade: reconnaissance craft observe enemy movement, shelters, and equipment and relay data in real time, while strike assets hit targets at tactical, operational, and strategic depth.

== Casualties ==
On 29 August 2026, Brovdi said that the brigade had lost 79 service members killed since the war began. By comparison, he claimed that, since 21 July 2024, the brigade had inflicted losses of 50,336 Russian troops killed or wounded. (Note: Of these, he claimed that 29,023 were killed and 21,313 were wounded.)

== Notable deaths ==
=== 2024 ===
- August 27, 2024 — Yurii Revera ("Graf"). Born 20 June 1973, Lviv.
- November 26, 2024 — Roman Yermakov ("Yenot"). Born 15 July 1980, Russia; moved to Lviv at the age of 15.
- December 6, 2024 — Volodymyr Kucherenko ("Borys"), pilot crew commander. Born 28 December 1977, Oleksandriia; an actor of the Kyiv "Toteatr" theater.

=== 2025 ===
- February 27, 2025 — Vasyl Ratushnyi, UAV operator.
- April 2, 2025 — Vadym Balanovskyi ("Ptakh").
- April 15, 2025 — Artem Olehovych Hrabovskyi, junior sergeant, operator.
- November 24, 2025 — Vadym Valentynovych Marchak ("Volbit"). Junior sergeant, UAV crew commander. Born 1995, Holovanivsk settlement. Killed near the village of Novopavlivka, Dnipropetrovsk Oblast, as a result of artillery shelling.

=== 2026 ===
- 2 January 2026 – Dmytro Hrynevych ("Chaika"), born 30 January 1990. Driver-electrician of an unmanned aerial complexes crew.

== Structure ==
As of 2025–2026, the brigade comprised:

- HQ and Services Company
  - Brigade Command & Management Plt
- 1st Unmanned Systems Battalion
- 2nd Unmanned Systems Battalion "Warmbusters"
- 4th Unmanned Systems Battalion
- 6th Unmanned Systems Battalion
- 7th UAV Interceptor Battalion
- 9th "Kairos" Battalion
- 13th Combined Detachment
- 93rd "Tsukrarnia of Magyar's Birds" Regiment
- Unmanned surface vessels naval division (personnel under Ukrainian Navy)

In October 2025 the brigade's strength was roughly doubled – to 12 battalions.

== Public activity and media ==
Robert "Magyar" Brovdi actively used social media to publicize the unit's activity, regularly posting videos of combat drone use on Telegram. The Times characterized this media activity as a component of information-psychological influence during the war, while Forbes noted the combination of reporting with an informal, ironic delivery that helped the posts spread widely online.

== Honors ==
The following have been awarded the highest state decorations:

- Robert Brovdi ("Magyar") — Major, brigade commander (2022–2025). Hero of Ukraine (2025), Cross of Combat Merit (2024).
- Andrii Klymenko ("Klima") — Captain, brigade commander (from 2025), Hero of Ukraine (2025).
- Andrii Mykhno ("Chernihiv") — junior lieutenant, Hero of Ukraine (2026, posthumously).
- "Payne", Hero of Ukraine.

On 11 June 2026 the brigade was awarded the honorary distinction "For Courage and Bravery" (Decree of the President of Ukraine No. 486/2026).

== See also ==
- Unmanned Systems Forces (Ukraine)
- Highway of Death (Ukraine) (2026)
- Deep strike campaign
