= Vadym Sukharevsky =

Ukrainian military commander

Hero of Ukraine Vadym Sukharevskyi
- Вадим Сухаревський
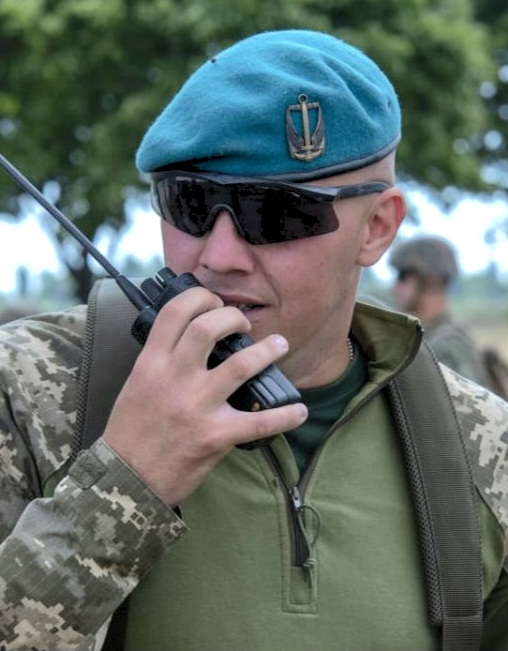
- Sukharevskyi in 2022
- Born: 6 October 1984 (age 42); Berehove, Ukrainian SSR, Soviet Union
- Other name: Badger
- Alma mater: Lviv Polytechnic
- Children: 2
- Military career
- Allegiance: Armed Forces of Ukraine
- Branch: Unmanned Systems Forces
- Service years: 2004–present
- Rank: Colonel
- Commands: Commander of the Unmanned Systems Forces (2024–); Commander of the 59th Motorized Infantry Brigade (2022–2024); Chief of Staff of the 35th Marine Brigade (2021–2022); Commander of the 503rd Marine Battalion (2016–2021)
- Conflicts: Iraq War; Russo-Ukrainian war: Russian invasion of Ukraine
- Awards: Hero of Ukraine (2022)

Vadym Olehovych Sukharevskyi (Ukrainian: Вадим Олегович Сухаревський), callsign Badger (Ukrainian: Борсук, romanized: Borsuk; born 6 October 1984), is a colonel of the Armed Forces of Ukraine. He had served as Commander of the Unmanned Systems Forces of Ukraine and Deputy Commander-in-Chief of the Armed Forces of Ukraine since 2024 to 2025. He was the first officer of the Armed Forces of Ukraine, under whose command fire was opened to defeat Russian militants in the Donbas war. In 2022, he was awarded Hero of Ukraine.

Sukharevskyi was previously Commander of the 59th Motorized Infantry Brigade (2022–2024), Chief of Staff of the 35th Marine Brigade (2021–2022), Commander of the 503rd Marine Battalion (2016–2021), and previously served in the Airborne Forces.

== Pre-war education and early career ==
Born 6 October 1984 in Berehove, Zakarpattia Oblast. Sukharevsky attended Mukachevo High School, which specializes in military and physical training.

From February to October 2004, as part of the 6th Mechanized Brigade, Sukharevsky was in Operation Iron Saber in Iraq, and took part in the battle against the Mahdi Army in Kut. In 2009 he graduated from the Institute of Ground Forces of Lviv Polytechnic, majoring in "Combat application and control of actions of airmobile units".

In 2011, Sukharevsky was promoted to senior lieutenant, to command the airmobile company of the 80th Airmobile Regiment. The commander of the regiment, Viktor Kopachynskyi, noted Sukharevskyi as one of the two best commanders of the regiment's companies.

== Russo-Ukrainian war ==
On the morning of 13 April 2014, a company from the 80th Airmobile Brigade, under the command of Senior Lieutenant Sukharevskiy, was redeployed to the vicinity of the city of Sloviansk in Donetsk Oblast. Sloviansk had been captured the previous day by Russian fighters under the leadership of Igor Girkin. Ukrainian paratroopers were supporting high-ranking officers from the General Staff and special forces Alpha Group who had arrived on the outskirts of Sloviansk. The group of Ukrainian officers was then ambushed by Russian fighters. The Ukrainian paratroopers hesitated, as they had been instructed not to open fire. Sukharevskiy was the first Ukrainian officer to fire at the Russian fighters when he ordered an armored personnel carrier machine gunner to open fire.

Later that year Sukharevskiy was wounded in battles near Krasny in Luhansk Oblast, and until 2016 studied at Ivan Chernyakhovsky National Defense University. After that he commanded the 1st line battalion of the 36th Marine Brigade near Mariupol.

In 2020, he was promoted to lieutenant colonel. From 2021 he was chief of staff of the 35th Marine Brigade. In 2022 he took command of the 59th Motorized Brigade. The same year he was awarded the title of Hero of Ukraine; at that time he held the rank of colonel, and was listed as one of the 25 most influential Ukrainian military personnel by the Ministry of Defense.

=== Unmanned Systems ===
Sukharevskyi was appointed commander of the newly created Unmanned Systems Forces in 2024, and also Deputy Commander-in-Chief of the Armed Forces. Comparing Russian and Ukrainian drone warfare, he said that the enemy has more drones, as they are better at mass production, but that Ukraine is first with innovations. He also said that by the end of the year he hoped to have unmanned ground vehicles in widespread use, and that alternatives to Starlink in the war would soon be in use in areas where it is not available, such as Crimea. In contrast the EU is not expected to have their satellite comms system IRIS² operational before the late 2020s.

On 3 June 2025, he was relieved of his command of the Unmanned Systems Forces.

== Personal life ==
Sukharevskyi is married, and has a daughter and a son.
