= List of Americans in the Armed Forces of Ukraine =

Since the Russian invasion of Ukraine in February 2022, it is estimated several thousand American citizens have served as volunteers in the Armed Forces of Ukraine, including within the International Legion. As of late 2024, at least 92 American citizens were killed serving in Ukraine, according to the Museum of the History of Ukraine in the Second World War. Subsequently, in late May 2026, the R.T. Weatherman Foundation stated that 118 Americans had been killed while fighting for Ukraine.

== History ==
In March 2022, the Ukrainian government said that 3,000 Americans had volunteered to fight for Ukraine. In March 2025, Ukraine said that there was a "flood of applications from Americans" after the reelection of Donald Trump. Many Americans have served in the units of the International Legion while others have served in other units such as Chosen Company, and the Norman Brigade. Some Americans have also served in private military companies such as the Mozart Group (until its disbandment in January 2023) and the Forward Observations Group.

On 8 November 2024, then US President Joe Biden officially allowed private military contractors to deploy to Ukraine where (according to the United States Department of Defense) they would be conducting maintenance on US supplied equipment such as the F-16 fighter jet.

Some American volunteers have voiced complaints about the leadership of Ukrainian officers. During an interview, an American volunteer who goes by the callsign "Redneck" told CNN, "While some officers gave foreigners and Ukrainians equal tasks, others will sell you out and get you killed just as quick." A wounded American volunteer who was interviewed in August 2026 by the Center for European Policy Analysis claimed that everyone in his unit has either been killed or wounded and that he and other members of the unit had not received their UBD, which would allow them to receive veteran's status.

== US military veterans ==
- Trent Davis, 21-year-old US Army veteran from Kansas killed on his first combat mission near Kherson in November 2022, among the earliest Americans confirmed killed in the conflict
- Andrew Webber, US military veteran killed in eastern Ukraine in July 2023, honored at a memorial ceremony on Kyiv's Independence Square in March 2024
- Will Cancel, former Marine killed in Ukraine in April 2022.
- Ryan O'Leary, US Army veteran, commanded Chosen Company between 2023 and 2025.
- Alex Drueke, captured by Russia in July 2022
- Andy Huynh, captured by Russia in July 2022
- Tristan Nettles, a US Marine Corps veteran who used his girlfriend to unwittingly transport drugs in Thailand.
- Craig Lang, a US Army veteran and double-murder suspect. He was later extradited back to the United States in 2024.

== Legality ==
The legality of American citizens serving in a foreign military is contingent upon the country remaining off the US's adversary/terrorism lists, whether the recruitment mechanism is passive rather than interactive, and whether the volunteer holds an officer commission.

Legal scholars have raised arguments centering on the methods of recruitment to the Armed Forces of Ukraine through digital means, including Ukraine's official volunteer site (fightforua.org).
