= Kotenko =

Kotenko (Ukrainian: Котенко) is a Ukrainian surname. Notable people with the surname include:

- Artem Kotenko (born 2012), Ukrainian singer
- Artur Kotenko (born 1981), Estonian footballer
- Ivan Kotenko (born 1985), Ukrainian footballer
- Sergey Kotenko (born 1956), Kazakhstani water polo player
- Serhiy Kotenko (1967–2022), Ukrainian colonel
