= 427th Unmanned Systems Brigade (Ukraine) =

Ukrainian military drone unit

427th Separate Unmanned Systems Brigade "Rarog"
- 427-ма окрема бригада безпілотних систем «Рарог»
- Brigade insignia
- Active: April 2023 – present
- Country: Ukraine
- Allegiance: Ukraine
- Branch: Unmanned Systems Forces
- Type: Unmanned systems
- Role: Drone warfare, aerial reconnaissance, surveillance and fire support
- Size: Brigade
- Nickname: Rarog
- Engagements: Russo-Ukrainian War

Commanders
- Commander: Colonel Serhiy Mazorchuk
- Notable commanders: Lieutenant Colonel Oleh Guyt

The 427th Separate Unmanned Systems Brigade "Rarog" (Ukrainian: 427-ма окрема бригада безпілотних систем «Рарог») is a military formation of the Unmanned Systems Forces of the Armed Forces of Ukraine. The brigade specializes in unmanned aerial systems, including first-person-view (FPV) drones, aerial reconnaissance, surveillance and artillery fire adjustment.

The unit was established in April 2023 as an unmanned aerial vehicle company of the 24th Mechanized Brigade named after King Danylo. It was subsequently expanded into a battalion, reorganized as the 427th Separate Unmanned Systems Regiment in February 2025, and expanded to brigade level in January 2026.

The brigade has been commanded by Colonel Serhiy "Irys" Mazorchuk since April 2026, succeeding its founder, Lieutenant Colonel Oleh "Hasan" Guyt.

== History ==
=== Formation and early development (2023–2024) ===
The unit was established in April 2023 as the "Rarog" unmanned aerial vehicle company within the 24th Separate Mechanized Brigade named after King Danylo. Its founder and first commander was Oleh "Hasan" Guyt.

Initially operating as a company, the unit conducted aerial reconnaissance and drone strikes in support of Ukrainian ground forces. It took part in combat operations during the Battle of Bakhmut and subsequently developed its capabilities in the use of FPV drones and other unmanned aerial systems.

As the unit expanded its personnel, equipment and operational capabilities, it was reorganized into a battalion.

During 2023 and 2024, the unit participated in combat operations in Donetsk Oblast, including the areas of Bakhmut, Chasiv Yar, Avdiivka and New York.

The unit employed reconnaissance drones, FPV strike drones and heavier multirotor unmanned aerial vehicles for attacks against military equipment and positions.

=== Expansion into a regiment (2025) ===
In February 2025, the "Rarog" battalion was expanded and reorganized into the 427th Separate Unmanned Systems Regiment. The reorganization also marked its separation from the 24th Mechanized Brigade, under which it had originally been established.

In early February 2025, the commanders of five Ukrainian unmanned systems formations — "Rarog", "K-2", "Achilles", the "Phoenix" border guard unit and "Madyar's Birds" — announced a joint initiative known as the "Drone Line", initially presented as the "Drone Force" project.

The initiative was intended to expand the use of unmanned aerial systems, improve coordination among specialized units and increase the role of drones in Ukrainian defensive operations.

In August 2025, the Ministry of Defence of Ukraine included the 427th Separate Unmanned Systems Regiment "Rarog" among the military formations participating in the "Contract 18–24" recruitment initiative for unmanned systems operators.

In October 2025, the regiment announced its transfer to the Unmanned Systems Forces of the Armed Forces of Ukraine.

=== Expansion into a brigade (2026) ===
On 1 January 2026, the 427th Separate Unmanned Systems Regiment "Rarog" was expanded to brigade level, becoming the 427th Separate Unmanned Systems Brigade "Rarog". The reorganization was publicly announced by the unit's command and reported by Interfax-Ukraine in January 2026.

The expanded formation continued to operate within the Unmanned Systems Forces, conducting reconnaissance and strike missions using unmanned aerial systems.

On 31 March 2026, the Unmanned Systems Forces announced the appointment of Oleh "Hasan" Guyt, the founder and former commander of "Rarog", as a deputy commander of the Unmanned Systems Forces.

In April 2026, Colonel Serhiy "Irys" Mazorchuk was appointed commander of the 427th Separate Unmanned Systems Brigade "Rarog", succeeding Guyt.

The brigade remained one of the formations participating in the Drone Line initiative. In 2026, the Ministry of Defence of Ukraine identified the 427th Separate Brigade "Rarog" as one of the participating units of the project.

== Organization and role ==
The brigade operates as a specialized unmanned systems formation within the Armed Forces of Ukraine. Its activities include aerial reconnaissance, surveillance, target acquisition, drone strikes and support for ground combat operations.

The unit employs different types of unmanned aerial vehicles for observation, reconnaissance, strike missions and logistical tasks.

According to MilitaryLand, following its expansion into a regiment and subsequently a brigade, the formation incorporated additional subordinate units and expanded its unmanned systems capabilities.

== Command ==
=== Commanders ===
- 2023 – April 2026: Lieutenant Colonel Oleh "Hasan" Guyt — founder and first commander of the unit, overseeing its development from a company into a brigade.
- April 2026 – present: Colonel Serhiy "Irys" Mazorchuk — commander of the 427th Separate Unmanned Systems Brigade "Rarog".

== Equipment ==
The unit operates various types of unmanned aerial vehicles, including reconnaissance, strike and heavy multirotor platforms. The following systems have been publicly associated with the formation.

Model	Country of origin	Type	Notes
Aerorozvidka R18	Ukraine	Multirotor bomber drone	
Vampire	Ukraine	Heavy multirotor bomber drone	
Kazhan	Ukraine	Multirotor bomber drone	
Nemesis	Ukraine	Heavy bomber drone	
Heavyshot	Ukraine	Bomber and transport drone	
DJI Mavic	China	Reconnaissance quadcopter	

== Traditions ==
=== Name ===
The brigade takes its name from the Raróg, a mythical bird of prey associated with fire in Slavic folklore. The Raróg is commonly represented as a falcon and is associated in folklore with fiery imagery and whirlwinds.

The name is reflected in the brigade's insignia and visual identity.

=== Unit insignia ===
The brigade's insignia depicts a stylized black falcon with its wings raised upward, placed on a grey heraldic shield with a black border.

The falcon is rendered using angular geometric lines. At the bottom of the shield is the inscription "РАРОГ 427 ОБРБПС", identifying the unit.

The insignia incorporates imagery associated with the mythological Raróg.

== See also ==
- Unmanned Systems Forces (Ukraine)
- Drone Line
- 24th Mechanized Brigade (Ukraine)
- Russo-Ukrainian War
