= 411th Unmanned Systems Brigade (Ukraine) =

411th Separate Unmanned Systems Brigade "Hawks"
- 411-та окрема бригада безпілотних систем «Яструби»
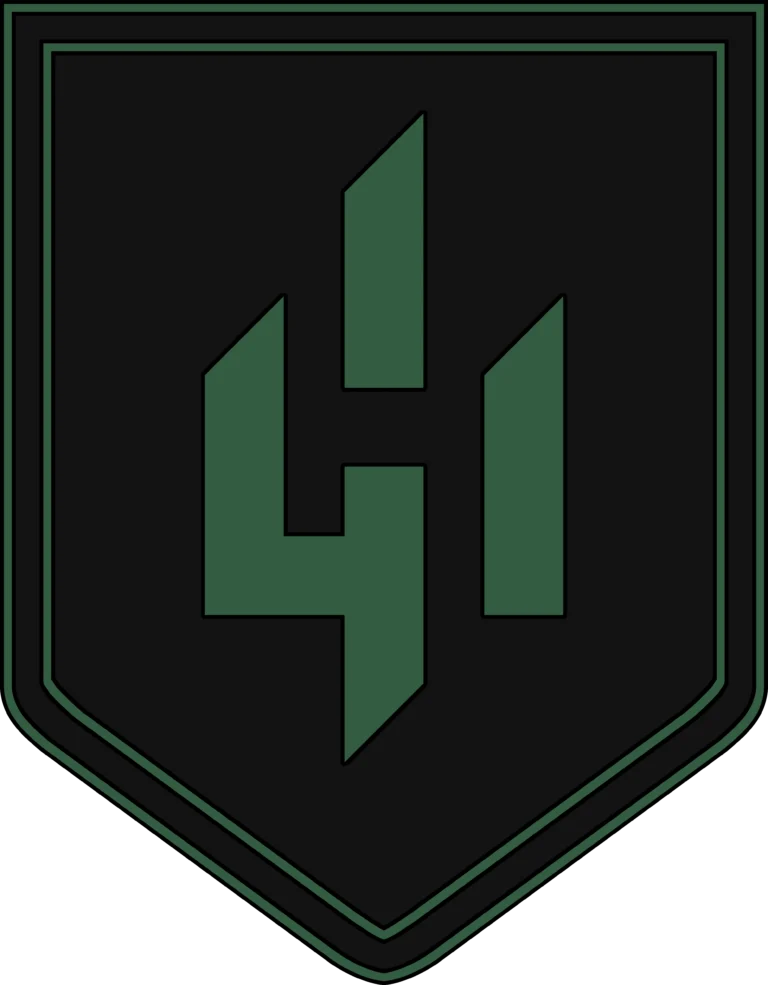
- Unit insignia (since 2024)
- Active: February 2022–present
- Country: Ukraine
- Allegiance: Ukraine
- Branch: Unmanned Systems Forces
- Role: Aerial Reconnaissance, Drone Warfare, FPV drone strikes, Ground Drone Warfare, Cargo, artillery spotting, electronic warfare integration
- Size: Brigade
- Part of: Unmanned Systems Command
- Garrison/HQ: Kyiv
- Nickname: Hawks (Ukrainian: Яструби)
- Motto: Astri scire omnia ("The Stars Know All")
- Engagements: Russian invasion of Ukraine (2022); Battle of Bakhmut; Battle of Soledar; Battle of Chasiv Yar; Battle of Yampil; 2023 Ukrainian counteroffensive; Battle of Robotyne; Battles on the left bank of Kherson; Pokrovsk offensive

Commanders
- Current commander: Colonel Andrii Sukhin, "Atlas" (since November 2022)

Insignia
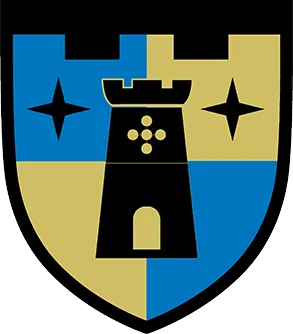
- Former Insignia

- Former Insignia

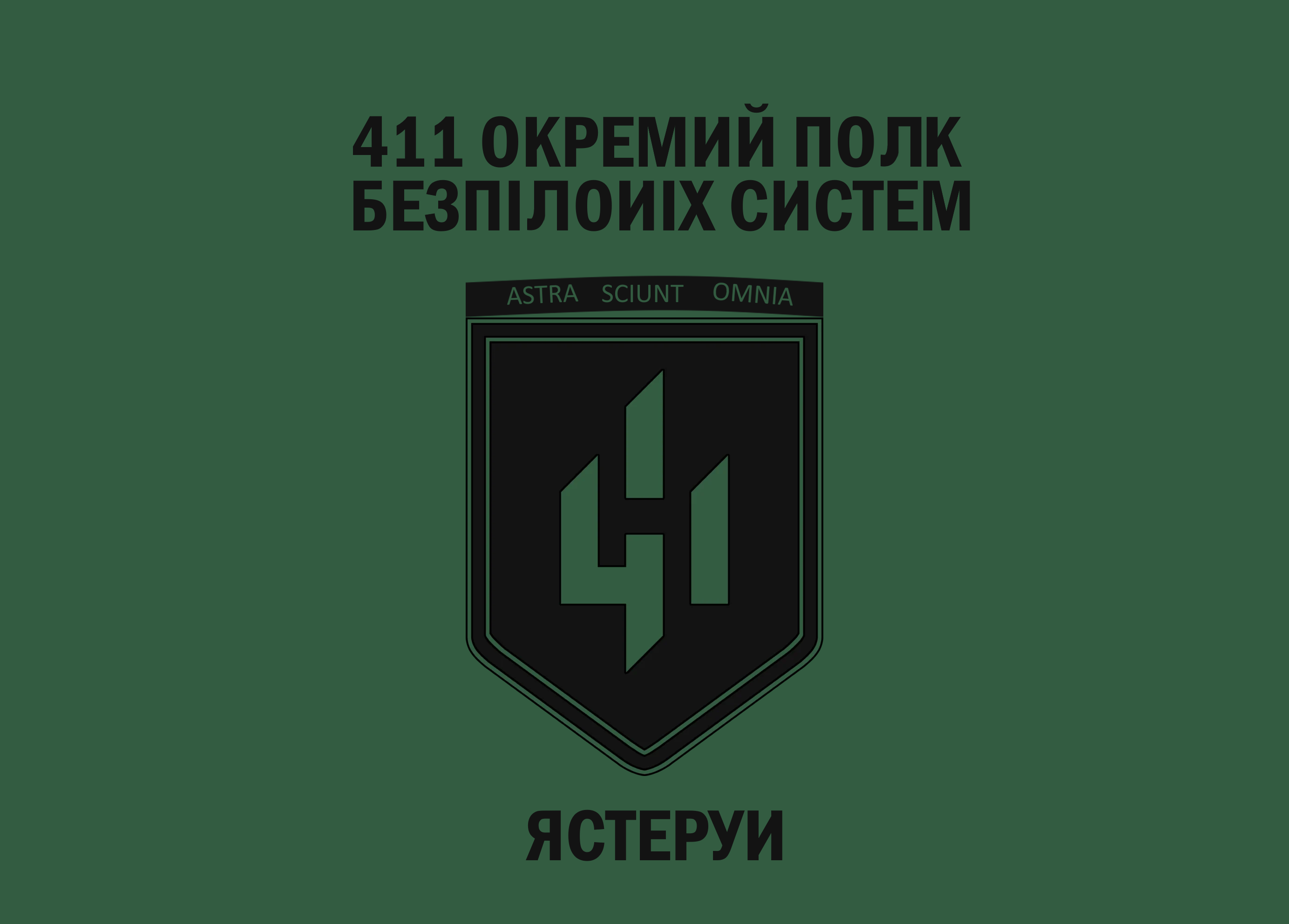
- Flag

The 411th Separate Unmanned Systems Brigade "Hawks" (Ukrainian: 411-та окрема бригада безпілотних систем «Яструби») is a brigade-level military unit of the Unmanned Systems Forces of the Armed Forces of Ukraine, specialising in drone warfare. Established in 2022 as a battalion within the Territorial Defence Forces, the unit was expanded to a regiment in December 2024 and to a brigade on 9 March 2026. In November 2025, it was transferred to the Unmanned Systems Forces.

== History ==
=== Formation and early operations (2022–2023) ===
The 411th Separate Battalion of Unmanned Aerial Complexes was formed in 2022 as part of the Territorial Defence Forces of Ukraine. Immediately after its establishment, the battalion's main units were deployed to Donetsk Oblast, Kherson Oblast, Kharkiv Oblast and Zaporizhzhia Oblast. Early operations included the battles for Bakhmut, Soledar, Chasiv Yar, Yampil, and Robotyne, as well as battles for Klishchiivka and Serebryansky Forest.

=== Technical reinforcement and expansion (2024) ===
By 2023–2024, the unit had transitioned to combined reconnaissance-strike operations, regularly employing both FPV platforms and long-range strike UAVs alongside traditional aerial reconnaissance.

On 14 May 2024, the unit received 33 pickup trucks, 12 electronic warfare systems and 50 UAV operation antennas to the unit, purchased with Kyiv city funds.

In October 2024, the unit's forces were engaged during the Pokrovsk offensive. On 17 December 2024, "Hawks" destroyed a Russian 9K33 Osa surface-to-air missile system along with enemy positions using precision drone strikes.

In December 2024, the battalion was also awarded pickup trucks, FPV drones and related equipment through the 'Let the Drone Fall' fundraising project of the Ukrainian Come Back Alive Foundation.

In December 2024, the battalion was expanded to form the 411th Separate Regiment of Unmanned Aerial Complexes.

In November 2025, the regiment joined the Unmanned Systems Forces.

In May 2025, the regiment conducted operations in Zaporizhzhia Oblast, targeting Russian personnel, equipment, and infrastructure.

On 20 June 2025, the regiment received 500 FPV drones, three reconnaissance UAVs and 50 electronic warfare systems donated by Kyiv residents.

In March 2026, the regiment was elevated to the status of a brigade.

== Tasks and missions ==
The brigade carries out a full spectrum of tasks in the combat zone:

- detection of enemy targets, observation, and artillery fire correction;
- striking the enemy using large-wing UAVs, bomber drones, and FPV drones;
- signals intelligence, decryption, analysis, and deep reconnaissance;
- coordination and control of small combat groups;
- remote mining, reconnaissance of mined areas, and demining.

== Innovations ==
The brigade is known for its innovative approach to combining UAV types and integrating electronic warfare equipment with autonomous complexes.

=== "Vezha" system ===
Brigade specialists developed the "Vezha" (Ukrainian: Вежа, "Tower") software platform, which collects, decrypts and analyses intelligence information in real time within the Ukrainian Armed Forces' situational awareness system Delta. The platform enables the Defence Forces to process over 4,000 intelligence objects per day.

=== Hawks Drone Camp ===
The brigade developed the "Hawks Drone Camp" initiative: a training programme for unmanned systems operators that enables civilian specialists without prior military experience to be recruited into service.

== Structure ==
As of 2026, the brigade comprises the following sub-units:

- Brigade headquarters and headquarters company
  - Command platoon
- 1st UAV Battalion
- 2nd "Shchedryk" UAV Battalion
- 3rd UAV Battalion
- "Eyes of God" Company

== Equipment ==
Model	Image	Origin	Type	Number	Notes
Unmanned Aerial Vehicles
Leleka-100		Ukraine	Loitering munition/Aerial Reconnaissance Drone		
Athlon Avia A1-CM Furia		Ukraine	Aerial Reconnaissance Drone		
FLIRT CETUS		Czechia	Aerial Reconnaissance Drone		
RQ-35 Heidrun		Denmark	Aerial Reconnaissance Drone		
DARTS		Ukraine	Loitering munition		
Wild Hornets		Ukraine			
Avenger		Ukraine	Strike Drone		
Sych		Ukraine	Strike Drone		
Vampire		Ukraine	Bomber drone		
Owl		Ukraine	Fiber optic drone		

== Command ==
- Colonel Andrii Sukhin "Atlas" (since 2022)

Andrii Sukhin has served as an officer of the Armed Forces of Ukraine since 1997 and was a participant in Ukraine's peacekeeping mission in Iraq. He is a graduate of Kharkiv Military University (faculty for missile troops unit employment) and the Kyiv National Economic University named after Vadym Hetman. Before the full-scale Russian invasion, he was engaged in entrepreneurial, civic, and volunteer activities. He returned to the ranks of the Armed Forces in the first days following 24 February 2022.

== Insignia ==
The unit's sleeve patch has a shield-like shape with a black background and a gold border. On the image of a fortress wall with three merlons — common to units of the Territorial Defence Forces — are placed stylised gold numerals "411", referring to the unit number. The numerals are arranged to simultaneously resemble the small state emblem of Ukraine — the Tryzub — and a bird of prey diving on a target from the sky.

The simplicity of the emblem underscores the contemporary character of the unit: instead of complex imagery, clear geometric forms — easily recognisable and reproducible across different media — were chosen.

The official motto — Astri scire omnia ("The Stars Know All") — emphasises the unit's mission. The stars of the motto symbolise omniscience and the ability to navigate in darkness, as well as a constant presence overhead. Combined with the image of a hawk, the motto conveys a unified message: the enemy can hide neither by day nor by night, for the "Hawks" can identify any target.

== Casualties ==
The following is a partial list of the brigade's personnel killed in action.

- 22 July 2023 — Mykhailo Molot, soldier, grenadier assistant. Age 49, from Ivanivka, Vinnytsia Oblast. Killed in combat near Terny, Donetsk Oblast.
- 5 May 2024 — Yevhen Dragniev "KENT", senior soldier, UAV pilot, 1st Company. Age 29, from Zaporizhzhia. Killed in combat near Kostyantynivka, Donetsk Oblast.
- 3 July 2024 — Artem Tieliebieniev "Talib", junior sergeant. Age 37, from Pavlohrad. Killed in combat near Robotyne.
- 24 September 2024 — Maksym Haidamaka, senior sergeant. Age 32, from Mykhailivtsi, Vinnytsia Oblast. Killed in action during the Kursk campaign.
- 10 January 2025 — Stanislav Komar, soldier. Age 25, from Kremenchuk. Killed in combat in Andriivka.
- 19 December 2025 — Oleksandr Hotsaliuk, soldier. Age 22, from Khorostkiv, Ternopil Oblast. Killed in combat in near Varvarivka, Zaporizhzhia Oblast.
