= Raróg =

Fire demon in Slavic mythology

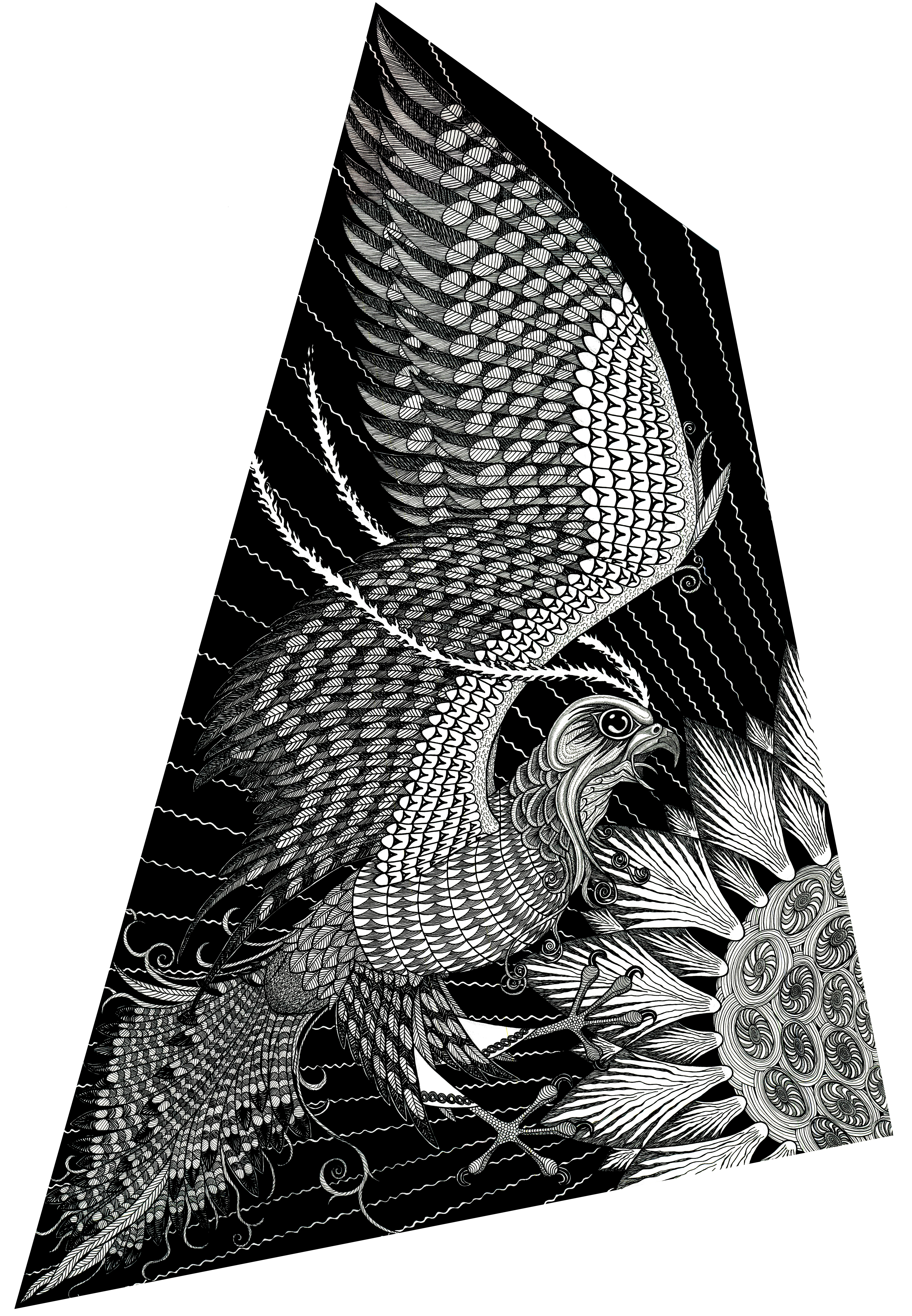
Rarog by Marek Hapon

In Slavic mythology, the Raróg (Russian: Рарог) or Raróh (Ukrainian: Рарог) is a fire demon, often depicted as a fiery falcon.

According to Czech folklore, a raroh can hatch from an egg that was incubated on a stove for nine days and nights, and can appear either as a fiery falcon or a dragon. In Polish folklore, the rarog is a tiny bird that can be held in a pocket, and can bring people happiness.

A caldera on Jupiter's moon Io was named Rarog Patera, a massive eruption from which was recorded by the W. M. Keck Observatory and Japan's HISAKI (SPRINT-A) spacecraft on August 15, 2013.

The northern cardinal-shaped logo of the Polish video game company CD Projekt is called the Raróg. The 427th Unmanned Systems Regiment of the Armed Forces of Ukraine is also named "Rarog".

== See also ==
- Hierofalco
- Bennu, Egyptian firebird
- Firebird (Slavic folklore) (Жар-Птица)
- Huma (mythology), Persian firebird
- Phoenix (mythology), sacred firebird found in the mythologies of many cultures
- Simurgh
- Slavic mythology
- Svarog
