= Unmanned Systems Forces of Ukraine =

Branch of the Ukrainian military

Unmanned Systems Forces
- Сили безпілотних систем
- Founded: 6 February 2024
- Country: Ukraine
- Type: Military branch
- Role: Drone warfare
- Size: 40,000 – 80,000
- Part of: Armed Forces of Ukraine
- Headquarters: Kyiv
- Motto: One step ahead!
- Anniversaries: 11 June, Day of the USF
- Equipment: UGV, UAV and USV
- Engagements: Russo-Ukrainian war (2022–present)
- Website: usforces.army

Commanders
- Current commander: Major Robert Brovdi
- Notable commanders: Colonel Vadym Sukharevsky (6 February 2024 – 3 June 2025)

Insignia
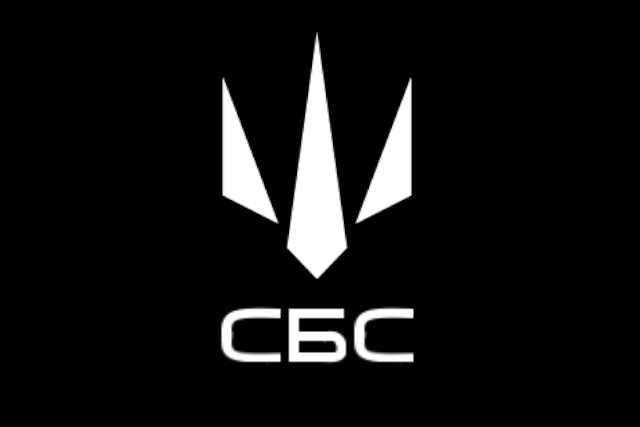
- Flag

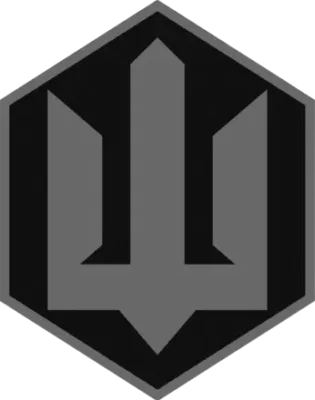
- Shoulder sleeve insignia

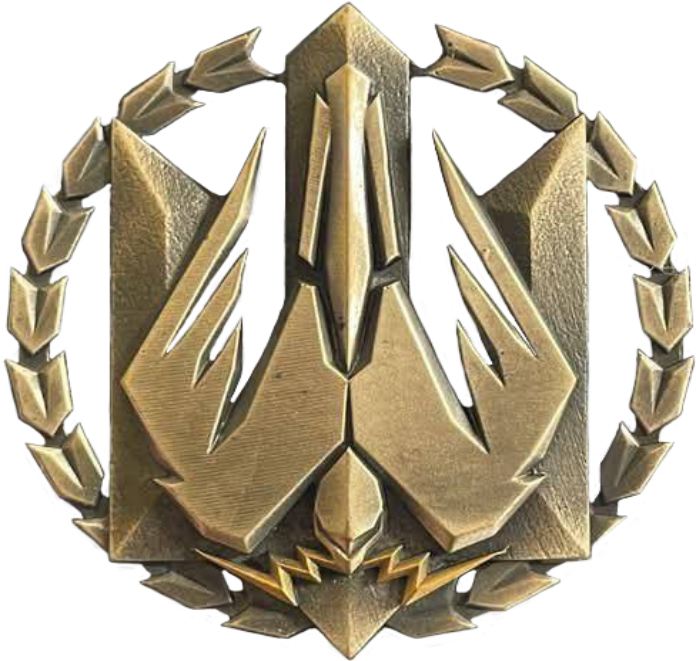
- Beret insignia

The Unmanned Systems Forces (USF; Ukrainian: Сили безпілотних систем, СБС, romanized: Syly bezpilotnykh system, SBS, lit. '"Pilotless Systems Forces"') is a branch of the Armed Forces of Ukraine.

Ukraine is the first country to have a separate branch of its military dedicated to unmanned systems. The USF was formally established on 11 June 2024, in the midst of the ongoing Russian invasion of Ukraine.

The USF conducts drone warfare using unmanned military robots on land, sea, and air. The USF does not command or control all Ukrainian drones. The Navy, the Marine Corps and the Air Force control their own drone units, as do most of the brigades and units in the various land-based forces (Ground Forces, Air Assault Forces, National Guard, Special Operation Forces, Communications and Cybersecurity Troops, etc) of the Armed Forces of Ukraine.

== History ==
=== Formation ===
On 6 February 2024, Ukrainian President Volodymyr Zelenskyy issued a decree “On Building Up the Capabilities of the Defence Forces”, instructing the Government of Ukraine and the General Staff to create a separate branch of the Armed Forces dedicated to unmanned systems, after which the National Security and Defense Council of Ukraine would consider the issue.

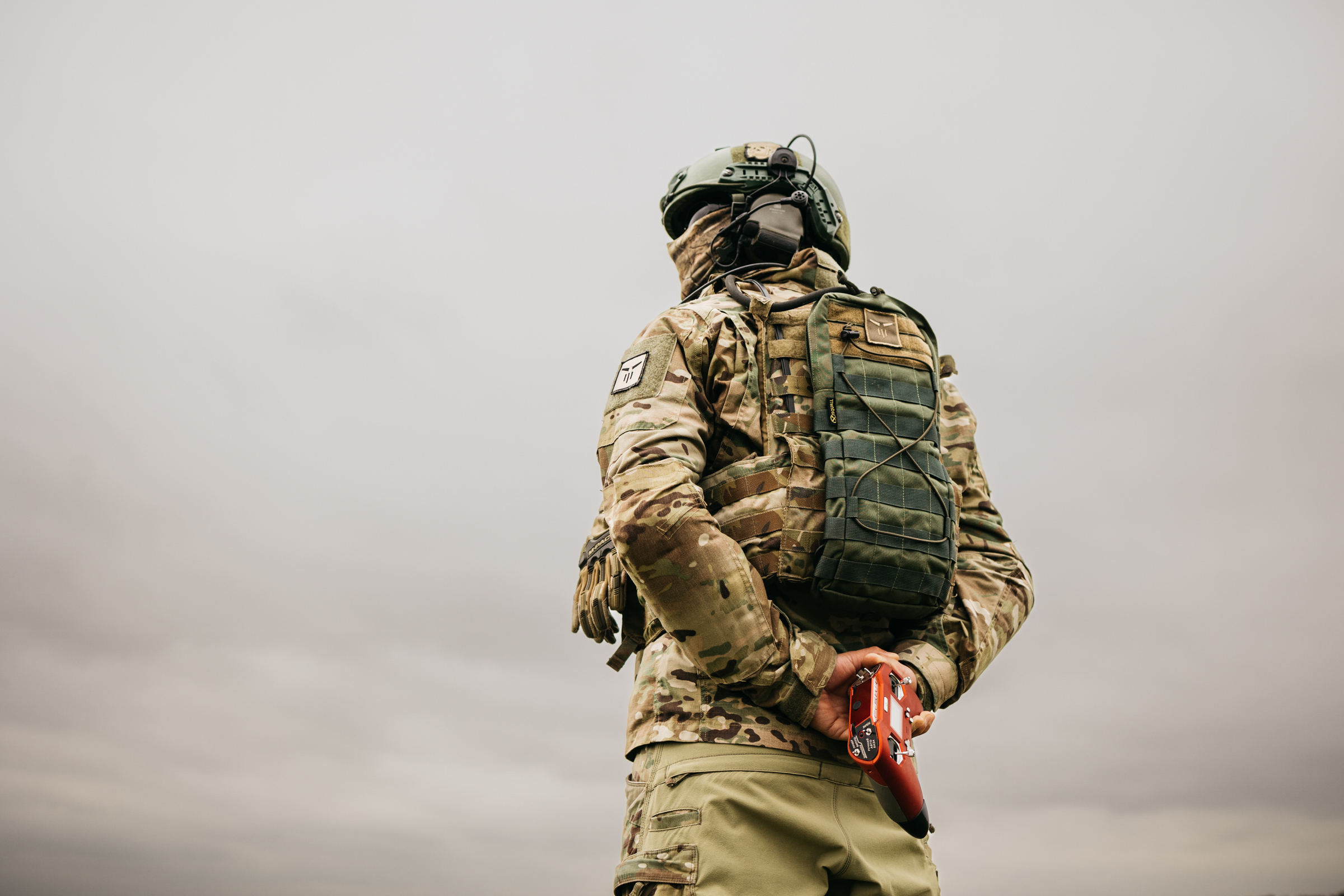
USF serviceman at a military training event

On 10 February, it was announced that Colonel Vadym Sukharevsky had become deputy of Commander-in-Chief Oleksandr Syrskyi and would be responsible for the implementation of unmanned systems. Since the start of the fullscale Russian invasion, Sukharevsky was a commander of 59th Motorized Brigade.

Colonel Vadym Sukharevskyi – his focus is on unmanned systems and the development of utilization of drones by our soldiers, and Colonel Andriy Lebedenko – his focus is on innovation, specifically the technology component of the army and combat systems – have been appointed deputies of Commander-in-Chief Oleksandr Syrskyi. Clear practice with new technologies is needed. There are more than enough theories; everything must work in practice for the sake of Ukrainian goals and the maximum preservation of the lives of our soldiers.

— Volodymyr Zelenskyy

On 7 May 2024, the Cabinet of Ministers of Ukraine supported a draft decree developed by the Ministry of Defense and General Staff to formally establish the Unmanned Systems Forces.

On 10 June, the Ukrainian Ministry of Defence announced that Colonel Vadym Sukharevsky was appointed commander of the UAV Forces.

=== Development ===
==== 2024 ====
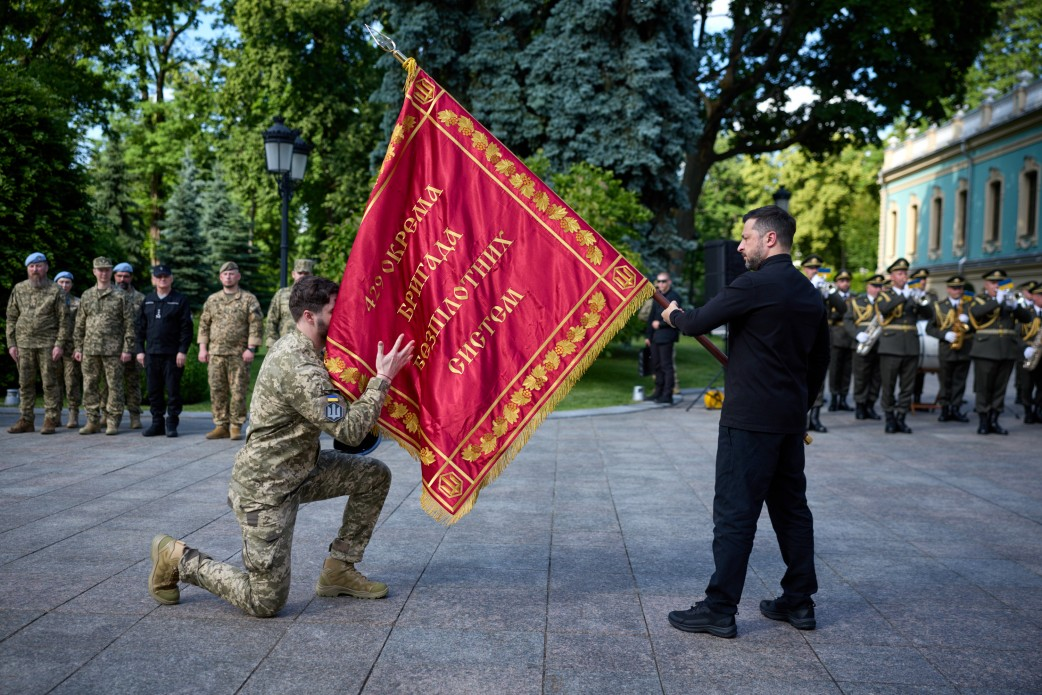
The 429th Unmanned Systems Brigade “Achilles” receives its battle flag by President Volodymyr Zelenskyy

On 11 June 2024, the force was formally established. The main mission of the USF according to the Center for Strategic and International Studies (CSIS) is centered around "gathering experience, disseminating knowledge, and formalizing these insights into statutes and tactical and operational guidelines" for the Armed Forces.

On 25 June 2024, the President of Ukraine signed the Decree establishing the USF of the Armed Forces of Ukraine. The Unmanned Systems Forces became a separate branch within the Armed Forces of Ukraine.

On 30 July 2024, a recruitment centre began operating in Lviv, fitted out with drone simulators so that candidates could see and understand for themselves how such aerial vehicles work.

On 3 September 2024, the Verkhovna Rada of Ukraine passed Law No. 11507, which defines the Unmanned Systems Forces as the separate branches of the Armed Forces of Ukraine. On 16 September, the President of Ukraine signed the law.

On 23 October 2024, the chief of staff of the forces, Roman Hladkyi, was dismissed from his position.

According to the CSIS, the USF maintains close contact with 90% of the domestic drone manufacturers, testing new systems and providing feedback to the developers while training drone operators for combat. The CSIS also reported that as of November 2024, the USF integrated more than 170 different unmanned systems.

==== 2025 ====
The 59th Motorized Brigade was reformed as the 59th Separate Assault Brigade and transferred to the Unmanned Systems Forces in January 2025. On 5 January 2025, Commander-in-Chief Syrskyi stated that the USF began deploying fiber-optic controlled drones in response to the Russians making use of them. Syrskyi also mentioned an increase in the number of brigades equipped with enhanced drones and that the Armed Forces were on the final stages of organizing a dedicated unmanned systems brigade.

On 3 June 2025, Robert “Magyar” Brovdi was appointed Commander of the Unmanned Systems Forces of the Armed Forces of Ukraine. Following the appointment of Robert "Magyar" Brovdi as commander, a 100-day action plan for the Unmanned Systems Forces was made public, setting out a package of measures to transform the USF. Among the priorities identified were the development of a 12-layered employment of unmanned assets in the tactical and operational depth, the expansion of personnel training, the scaling up of munitions production to supply the units, and the employment of unmanned assets in the strategic depth.

Since 1 July 2025, a unified system for recording and verifying combat missions has been in effect for all Unmanned Systems Forces units, and an electronic combat log has been introduced.

As of August 2025, seven Unmanned Systems Forces units entered the top 17 of the “Top-500” ranking among unmanned units of Ukraine’s Defence Forces. Over the Grouping’s first three months of operation, the USF together with the “Drone Line” project increased their share of confirmed strikes from 21% to 36% of the national total.

On 4 September, the USF launched the “PIDRAKHUIKA” online system, which displays units’ verified combat results in real time.

On 30 October 2025, the USF announced a large-scale personnel intake –around 15,000 vacancies– with the majority of the positions being intended for drone crews and specialists from civilian professions: electronics engineers, programmers, designers, project managers, technical maintainers and drone operators.

By the results of October, seven units of the USF Grouping entered the fifteen most effective units of Ukraine’s Defence Forces.

On 1 November, the 411th Unmanned Systems Brigade "Hawks" (Ukrainian: Яструби, transliterated Yastruby) was incorporated into the Unmanned Systems Forces. The same day, the 412th Separate Nemesis Regiment of the Unmanned Systems Forces reported that it had scaled up to a brigade.

On 24 December, the 14th Separate UAV Systems Regiment was officially transformed into the 1st Separate Unmanned Systems Centre of the USF.

==== 2026 ====
On 2 January, it was reported that the 427th Separate Regiment “Rarog” of the Unmanned Systems Forces had scaled up to a brigade.

On 15 January the 429th Regiment “Achilles” was transformed into a brigade of the Unmanned Systems Forces.

On 9 March, the 411th Brigade “Hawks” of the Unmanned Systems Forces scaled up to a brigade.

On 10 June 2026, President Volodymyr Zelenskyy announced, that the 11 of June would become Unmanned Systems Forces Day commemorating their 2024 foundation.

== Operations ==
=== 2024 ===
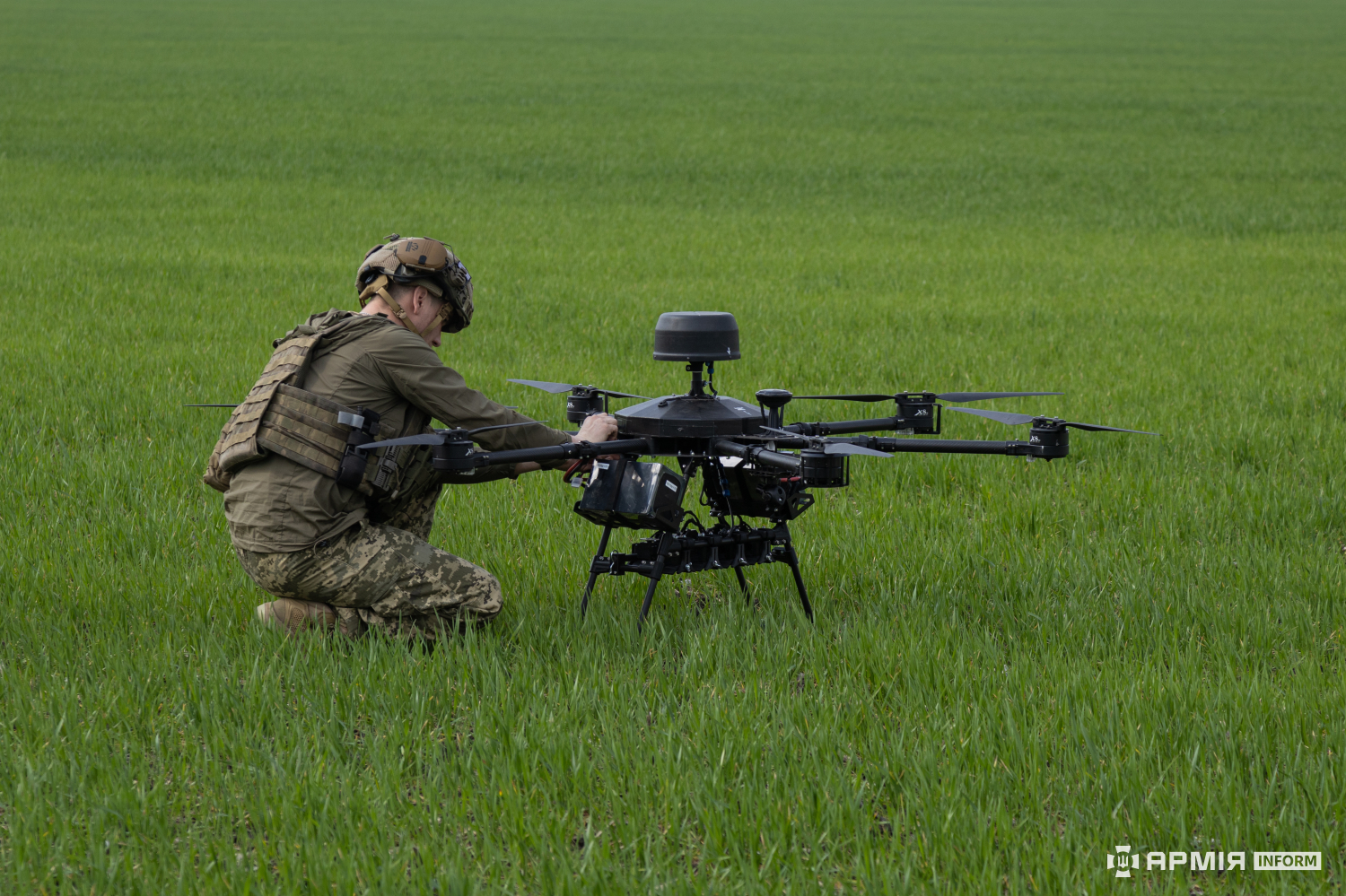
USF member testing a "Vampire" UCAV

In mid-2024, the Unmanned Systems Forces claimed to have better quality drones than the Russian Armed Forces, despite Russia having six times the quantity.

As of June 2024, around 3,000 soldiers were reported to be in the USF.

=== 2025 ===
On 14 January 2025, Ukraine attacked Russian chemical factories and energy infrastructure in Bryansk, Saratov, and Tula Oblasts and the Republic of Tatarstan with missiles. The USF claimed that "drones successfully distracted Russian air defences, paving the way for missiles that hit the main targets."

In the late night of 28 January or the early morning of 29 January 2025, the 14th Separate Unmanned Aerial Vehicle Regiment launched a strike on a pumping station on the Druzhba pipeline along the Russian-Belarusian border in Bryansk Oblast reportedly using drones capable of dropping bombs on their targets. These drones carry a FAB-250 M-54 high-explosive bomb on their underbellies and feature an optical sighting system for precision strikes. On 31 January 2025, the Unmanned System Forces confirmed the use of drones carrying 250 kg (550 lb) aerial bombs. According to the USF Command, these drones are capable of "reaching up to 2,000 kilometres (1,200 mi) with the possibility of return. This is a unique development that changes the rules of the game on the battlefield."

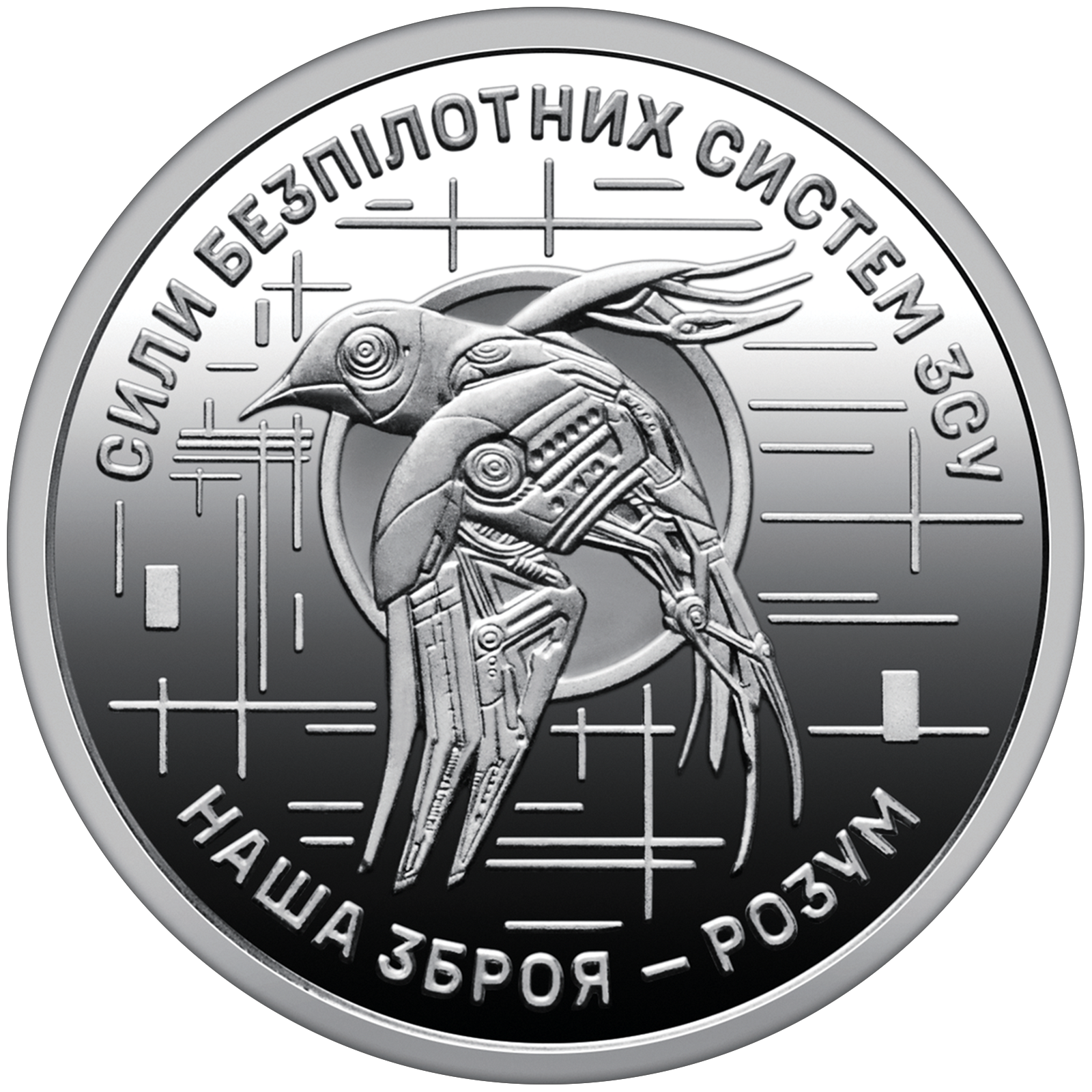
ISF commemorative coin: "Our weapon is our intellect" (September 2025)

First announced in December 2024, on 13 April 2025, the Unmanned Systems Forces released the first footage of a laser weapon system, called “Tryzub”, in use destroying a fibre optic FPV drone. That day the USF unveiled the “Alihator-9” naval anti-ship unmanned vessel. The unmanned surface vessel itself is a platform on which various munitions can be mounted depending on the assigned missions.

On 9 July 2025, Ukrainian C-in-C Oleksandr Syrskyi claimed that the Unmanned Systems Forces had struck 19,600 targets (one-third of all targets hit) and destroyed 5,024 (Note: Specifically, 88 Russian tanks, 129 armoured combat vehicles, 427 artillery systems and 31 multiple-launch rocket systems (MLRS) destroyed) in June 2025 alone. He also claimed that the USF had killed or wounded 4,500 on Russian forces, of whom 2,548 had been killed.

On 8 August 2025, Syrskyi claimed that the Unmanned Systems Forces' drones hit 23,400 Russian targets and killed 5,134 enemy personnel in July 2025.

On 14 August 2025, the Unmanned Systems Forces struck an oil refining facility of the “Lukoil” company in Russia’s Volgograd Oblast.

On 17 August, operators of the 429th Separate Regiment “Achilles” used FPV drones to destroy a T-90M “Proryv” tank.

On 22 August, the Unmanned Systems Forces struck infrastructure of the “Druzhba” oil pipeline near Unecha in Bryansk Oblast, which led to a temporary halt in supplies of Russian oil to Hungary along that route.

On 18 September 2025, USF Commander Robert “Magyar” Brovdi summed up the first 100 days of work: units had flown more than 402,000 sorties, striking or destroying almost 77,000 targets, while the number of combat crews grew by 49%. Despite the fact that, by NATO estimates, the USF account for around 2% of Ukraine’s entire Defence Forces, during this period it proved possible to introduce an electronic combat log, unified reporting and a multi-layered system for employing drones. In addition, the planning of equipment requirements was automated and a monthly supply of more than 50,000 munitions for unmanned systems, including domestically produced ones, was secured.

On 29 September, operators of the 59th Separate Assault Brigade “Steppe Predators” of the USF used an FPV drone to destroy a Mi-8 transport-attack helicopter.

In November 2025, Unmanned Systems Forces units conducted 108 Deep Strike combat missions, striking 88 enemy facilities, including oil refining industry enterprises and energy and military infrastructure facilities.

As of December 2025, USF drone operators were flying 100,000 to 120,000 sorties a month and had launched combined drone attacks against Russian energy-related targets, particularly Yaroslavl oil refinery “Slavneft-YANOS”, at least 225 times, effectively reducing Russian national oil processing capacity by about 20%. Since the creation of the Unmanned Systems Forces Grouping, more than 50,000 enemy personnel had been hit, of whom more than 28,500 were eliminated.

==== Deep Strike Centre ====
On 25 December 2025, on the initiative of Robert “Magyar” Brovdi, the USF Deep Strike Centre was created to coordinate and plan complex strikes against targets in the operational and strategic depth. The new structure enables unmanned systems operations to be conducted at long range from the front line.

Over the first 48 days of 2026, Unmanned Systems Forces units struck more than 240 enemy facilities in the strategic depth and in the temporarily occupied territories.

On 18 March, operators of the 1st Separate Centre of the USF struck the 123rd Aircraft Repair Plant in the town of Staraya Russa, Novgorod Oblast.

On 3 April 2026, the Unmanned Systems Forces struck the “Bashneft-Novoil” oil refinery.

On 5 April, operators of the 1st Separate Centre of the USF, the 414th Separate Brigade “Magyar’s Birds” and the 413th Separate Regiment “Raid” carried out a series of strikes on the “Lukoil-Nizhegorodnefteorgsintez” oil refinery in Kstovo, Nizhny Novgorod Oblast. The same day, operators of the 1st Separate Centre struck the oil terminal at the port of Primorsk in Leningrad Oblast.

On 16 April, operators of the 1st Separate Centre of the USF, jointly with other components of Ukraine’s Defence Forces, struck the Tuapse oil refinery, which forms part of the “Rosneft” structure.

On 19 April, operators of the unmanned surface systems squadron of the 412th Separate Brigade NEMESIS intercepted a Shahed-type strike UAV using an interceptor drone launched from an unmanned surface platform.

On 25 April, operators of the 1st Separate Centre struck the military Shagol airfield in Russia’s Chelyabinsk Oblast. According to the USF, the strike hit two Su-57 fighters, an Su-34 fighter-bomber and one further Su-type aircraft of an unidentified variant.

On 16 June 2026, operators of the 1st Separate Centre of the Unmanned Systems Forces, in cooperation with the Special Operations Forces, the Main Directorate of Intelligence of the Ministry of Defence of Ukraine and the Security Service of Ukraine, struck the Moscow oil refinery.

On 18 June, operators of the 1st Separate Centre, the 412th Separate Brigade NEMESIS, the 413th Separate Regiment “Raid” and the 414th Separate Brigade “Magyar’s Birds”, in cooperation with other components of Ukraine’s Defence Forces, struck the Moscow oil refinery again.

From July 2026, the Unmanned Systems Forces began conducting systematic operations to strike dual-use depots and logistics hubs on the territory of the Russian Federation.

In August 2026, the USF Commander reported that in July, Russian troop personnel losses from the employment of drones by Ukraine’s Defence Forces amounted to 30,957.

During July 2026, Unmanned Systems Forces units struck 35 elements of the enemy’s air defence. In total, over seven months of 2026, USF units have hit and destroyed 230 air defence assets.

As of September 19, the Unmanned Systems Forces had reached 300 enemy air defense systems and assets destroyed or damaged over 261 days of 2026.

=== 2026 ===
On 5 January 2026, the USF reported that over the Grouping’s first seven months of operation its units had flown more than 832,000 combat sorties and struck more than 168,000 targets, including 532 tanks and around 2,500 artillery systems; more than 350 targets were on the territory of Russia.

On 6 January 2026, Ukrainian CinC General Oleksandr Syrskyi claimed that in December 2025, Ukrainian drones "neutralized" 33,000 Russian soldiers. He also claimed this was the first month Russian losses exceeded Russian recruitment. He further claimed that the "figure includes only cases confirmed by video footage, while actual losses are likely higher." Currently the USF comprises just "2.2%" of the Armed Forces of Ukraine, with plans of expansion. General Syrskyi claimed Russian drone forces numbered at "80,000 personnel, with plans to expand them to 165,500 in 2026 and nearly 210,000 by 2030".

On 20 March, in Donetsk Oblast, operators of the “Height Predators” battalion of the 59th Separate Assault Brigade used an FPV drone to destroy a Russian Ka-52 “Alligator” reconnaissance-attack helicopter.

On 7 April, the USF reported that over the Grouping’s first seven months of operation its units had shot down more than 21,000 fixed-wing UAVs, including more than 5,300 “Shahed” and “Gerbera” type UAVs and more than 16,500 enemy reconnaissance and strike drones and had eliminated more than 82,000 enemy service personnel.

On 11 May 2026, Robert “Magyar” Brovdi announced the “Standard-10” formula, under which every strike crew of Ukraine’s Defence Forces was to deliver at least 10 confirmed strikes against enemy personnel per month.

On 23 May 2026, the 9th Battalion “Kairos” of the 414th Separate Brigade “Magyar’s Birds” struck a small missile ship in the area of the Novorossiysk naval base in Russia’s Krasnodar Krai.

On the night from 29 to 30 May USF units struck two Tupolev Tu-142 and a 9K720 Iskander ballistic missile launcher near Taganrog according to Robert “Magyar” Brovdi and supported by footage of the 1st Center.

On 3 June 2026, operators of the 1st Separate Centre of the Unmanned Systems Forces struck the Project 20380 corvette “Boikiy” of the Russian Navy’s Baltic Fleet, which was in dry dock at Kronstadt.

On 9 June, Robert “Magyar” Brovdi reported that, as a result of strikes by Ukraine’s Defence Forces, freight traffic along the land corridor to occupied Crimea on the Mariupol – Berdiansk – Melitopol – Simferopol stretch had fallen by 71% over two weeks.

By Decree of the President of Ukraine No. 485/2026, the Day of the Unmanned Systems Forces of the Armed Forces of Ukraine was established, observed annually on 11 June.

From 11 June 2025 to 8 August 2026, USF units flew more than 2.1 million combat sorties and struck more than 462,000 targets, among them enemy equipment, unmanned aerial vehicles and other military objects, while the number of enemy personnel hit exceeded 122,000.

Starting in July 2026, the USF initiated Operation "Crimean Switch Off" targeting substations throughout Crimea, aiming to disrupt power supplies in the region. According to Robert “Magyar” Brovdi from July 1 to July 20 the USF has struck 104 substations and power facilities.

From July 6 through August, aerial and sea drones of the USF together with those of the Ukrainian Navy have conducted a chain of attacks against Russian vessels in the Sea of Azov, striking approximately 116 ships according to a statement from Robert “Magyar” Brovdi. Among those vessels, at least 57 were stated to be tankers allegedly part of the Russian shadow fleet, used to deliver fuel to occupied Crimea. As a direct consequence of such repeated attacks, on July 10 Russia's border guard has announced the temporary halting of shipping through the Volga-Don Canal. This move also impacted the national export of grain, of which around one-quarter of Russia wheat exports passed through said channel.

==== 2026 Combined Resolve exercise ====
During the 2026 Combined Resolve exercise in Germany, operators from the 412th Unmanned Systems Brigade, served as part of the opposing force against United States troops. According to The Wall Street Journal, Ukrainian drone operators quickly located U.S. vehicles and simulated attacks, using reconnaissance, FPV, and drone dropped munitions, prompting the American force to adjust its dispersal, camouflage and electronic warfare. This isn't the first time Ukrainian forces demonstrated such superiority, according to reports U.S. forces developed new training programs following a 2023 exercise with Ukrainian forces.

=== Drone line ===
In June 2025 a new command-within-a-command was formed. Five of the most effective, of the then twelve main combat units, were grouped together as the Drone Line. Four of these units were: 20th UAV Brigade ('K-2'), 414th UAV Brigade ('Ptahi Madyara' - Birds of Madyar), 427th UAV Brigade ('Rarog') and 429th UAV Bde ('Achilles'). The fifth unit is described as a unit of the State Border Guard Service (DPS), the DPS UAV Regiment ('Feniks' - Phoenix), but which is otherwise presented as a regular component of the autonomous Unmanned Systems Command. Several of the remaining units are engaged in specialist developments, or in offensive operations, which preclude them - entirely or partially - from general air defense duties.

=== AD-cide ===
One of the key priorities of the Unmanned Systems Forces is the systematic destruction of enemy air defences – a line of effort that has acquired the public name “AD-cide”. Over the winter of 2025–2026, USF units neutralised 54 enemy air defence assets in the temporarily occupied territories and in regions of the Russian Federation, and in April 2026, in cooperation with the Deep Strike Centre, struck a further 38 similar targets.

Over the first five months of 2026, units of the Unmanned Systems Forces Grouping struck 174 enemy air defence assets, among them surface-to-air missile systems, radar stations and electronic warfare assets. By the results of June 2026, units of the Unmanned Systems Forces Group struck 32 enemy air defence assets.

On 20 July 2026, operators of the 1st Separate Centre of the Unmanned Systems Forces struck eight elements of Russia’s air defence system in the operational depth.

On 19 September 2026, the USF reached a total of 300 enemy air defence systems and assets destroyed or damaged over 261 days of 2026.

=== Operation “MoLoChKa” ===
In early July 2026, the Unmanned Systems Forces launched Operation “MoLoChKa” (an abbreviation of “Moskva Liazhe Cherez Krym” – “Moscow Will Fall Through Crimea”), aimed at the systematic striking of vessels of the Russian “shadow fleet” and the disruption of Russia’s maritime logistics in the Sea of Azov. The operation was conducted under the coordination of the USF Deep Strike Centre. Its targets were oil tankers, dry cargo ships, ferries, tugs and other watercraft involved in Russian maritime logistics. One of the campaign’s objectives was to reduce Russia’s capacity to transport oil and petroleum products and, accordingly, the revenues used to finance the war. Between 6 and 12 July, the USF reported 90 vessels struck, and within eight days of the start of the campaign – 105. On the night of 13 July, a further 15 vessels were struck.

Later, Robert “Magyar” Brovdi reported the expansion of Operation “MoLoChKa” into the waters of the Black Sea. According to him, the first stage of the campaign in the Sea of Azov concluded with 116 vessels of the Russian “shadow fleet” struck. On the night of 15 July, as part of the new stage of the operation, the USF struck 20 vessels in the Black Sea.

As of 17 July, over 12 days of Operation “MoLoChKa”, 159 vessels of the Russian “shadow fleet” had been struck: 117 in the Sea of Azov and 42 in the Black Sea.

On 18 July, the USF Commander reported that Operation “MoLoChKa” had forced the Russian command to redeploy forces from the line of contact to protect “shadow fleet” vessels.

On 19 July, Robert “Magyar” Brovdi reported that over two weeks of Operation “MoLoChKa” the throughput capacity of the Kerch ferry crossing had fallen by 75%.

By the results of July 2026, as part of Operation “MoLoChKa” the Unmanned Systems Forces reported 206 strikes on vessels of the Russian “shadow fleet” in the Sea of Azov and the Black Sea.

Over the ten weeks of the USF’s Operation “MoLoChKa”, 285 vessels of Russia’s “shadow fleet” were struck in the Black Sea and the Sea of Azov.

=== Operation “Crimean Switch OFF” ===
In early July 2026, the Unmanned Systems Forces launched Operation “Crimean Switch OFF”, aimed at striking the energy infrastructure that sustained the Russian military presence in occupied Crimea and in the south of the occupied territories of Ukraine.

On 1–2 July, USF units struck 12 electrical substations and one gas distribution station, and over 1–5 July – a total of 37 energy nodes in Crimea and in the occupied territories of southern Ukraine. On the night of 6 July, operators of the 1st Separate Centre of the USF, the 9th Battalion “Kairos” of the 414th Separate Brigade “Magyar’s Birds”, the 412th Separate Brigade NEMESIS and the “Phoenix” unit struck the 330 kV “Simferopolska” substation in Simferopol.

During July 2026, as part of Operation “Crimean Switch OFF”, USF units struck 166 energy nodes in occupied Crimea and in other occupied territories of southern Ukraine.

Over the two months of the Operation “Crimean Switch OFF” (July 6–September 9, 2026), 374 energy nodes were struck in occupied Crimea and other temporarily occupied territories of Ukraine.

=== Women drone operators ===
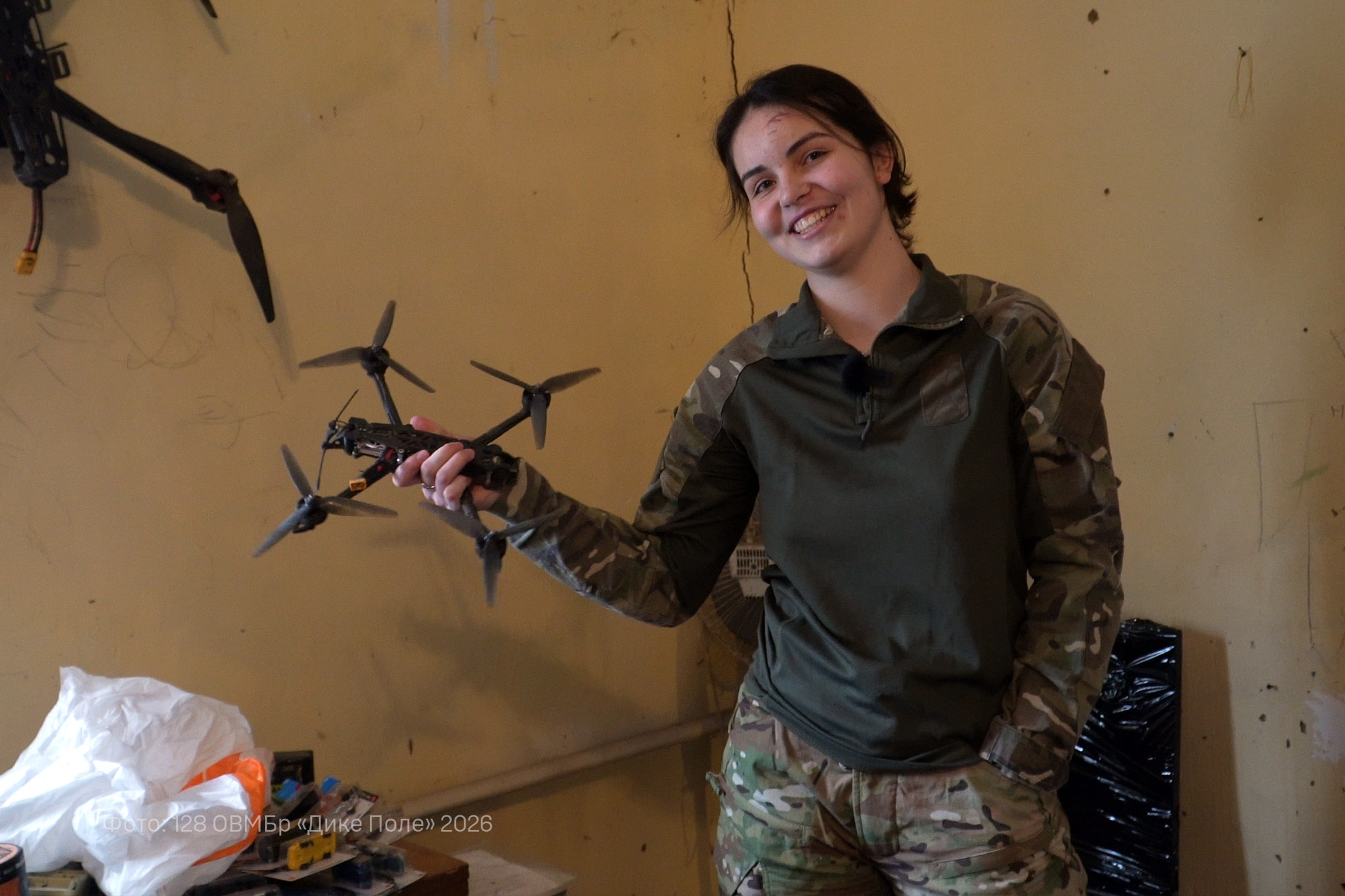
A woman drone operator in the USF

The Ukrainian Armed Forces are notably conservative regarding women as soldiers, reflecting the views of the wider society. However, the innovative field of drone warfare appeals to many women volunteers, and the USF Command is notably supportive of this interest. A wholly - or largely - unit composed of women (Harpii - the Harpies) exists with the 9th UAV Brigade, and many more women serve as individuals in other units in both the central USF command and in the brigade or corps-level UAV units.

== Honours ==
=== 2025 ===
On 1 October, Supreme Commander-in-Chief Volodymyr Zelenskyy presented the battle flag to the 14th Separate UAV Systems Regiment of the USF. The same day, by Decree of the President of Ukraine, the 59th Separate Brigade of the Unmanned Systems Forces “Steppe Predators” was awarded the “For Courage and Valour” battle ribbon.

On 6 December, Supreme Commander-in-Chief Volodymyr Zelenskyy presented battle flags to the 414th Separate Brigade of the USF “Magyar’s Birds” and to the 108th Separate Assault Battalion “Da Vinci Wolves” of the 59th Separate Brigade of the USF. Also, by Decree of the President of Ukraine, the title of Hero of Ukraine was conferred on Senior Lieutenant Andrii “Klima” Klymenko, commander of the 414th Separate Unmanned Systems Brigade “Magyar’s Birds”. The Order “For Courage” 1st Class was awarded to a platoon commander of the “Shkval” battalion of the 59th Separate Brigade of the USF “Steppe Predators”.

=== 2026 ===
On 27 January, commanders of Unmanned Systems Forces units received state awards. The title of Hero of Ukraine was conferred on Yurii Fedorenko (429th Separate Unmanned Systems Brigade "Achilles") and Oleh Huit (427th Separate Unmanned Systems Brigade "Rarog"), while Andrii Klymenko (414th Separate Unmanned Systems Brigade "Magyar's Birds") and Dmytro Oleksiuk ("Phoenix" UAV unit of the State Border Guard Service of Ukraine) were awarded the "Personalised Firearm". The Order "For Merit" 3rd Class was also awarded to Anatolii Merkotun (412th Separate Unmanned Systems Brigade Nemesis) and Oleksandr Sak (59th Separate Assault Brigade "Steppe Predators").

On 24 February, Supreme Commander-in-Chief Volodymyr Zelenskyy presented the battle flag to the 412th Separate Unmanned Systems Brigade Nemesis.

On 11 June 2026, during the first observance of the Day of the Unmanned Systems Forces, President of Ukraine Volodymyr Zelenskyy presented battle flags to the 427th Separate Unmanned Systems Brigade "Rarog" and the 429th Separate Unmanned Systems Brigade "Achilles".

On 15 July 2026, the Commander of the Unmanned Systems Forces of the Armed Forces of Ukraine, Robert "Magyar" Brovdi, was awarded the Order of Bohdan Khmelnytsky 1st Class pursuant to Decree of the President of Ukraine No. 603/2026.

== Structure ==
Unmanned Systems Forces General Command

=== Combat units ===
Center

- 1st Separate Center, Unmanned Systems Forces

Brigades

- 9th Unmanned Systems Brigade
- 20th Unmanned Systems Brigade “K-2”
- 59th Assault Brigade named after Yakiv Handziuk
  - Unit Signum
- 411th Unmanned Systems Brigade “Yastruby”
- 412th Unmanned Systems Brigade “NEMESIS”
- 414th Unmanned Strike Aviation Brigade “Magyar’s Birds”
  - 93rd Regiment "Magyar's Birds Sugar Factory"
- 427th Unmanned Systems Brigade “Rarog”
- 429th Unmanned Systems Brigade “ACHILLES”

Regiments

- 413th Unmanned Systems Regiment “Raid”

Battalions

- 424th Unmanned Systems Battalion “SVAROG”

=== Support units ===
- 93rd Support Battalion
- 230th Logistics Battalion
- 190th Training Center

== Command ==
=== Commander ===
- 10.06.2024–03.06.2025: Colonel Vadym Sukharevskyi
- from 03.06.2025: Major Robert “Magyar” Brovdi

=== Chief of Staff ===
- 2024–23.10.2024: Captain 1st Rank Roman Hladkyi. By decision of the General Staff he was suspended from the duties of his post for the duration of an SBU check regarding his wife’s possession of a Russian passport.
- from 10.2024: Colonel Oleksii Khalabuda

=== Personnel appointments ===
On 31 March 2026, Oleh “Khasan” Huit, who had commanded the 427th Separate Unmanned Systems Brigade “Rarog”, became Deputy Commander of the USF, while the commander of the State Border Guard Service unit “Phoenix”, Dmytro “Zemliak” Oleksiuk, was appointed acting Deputy Commander of the Group.

== See also ==
- Women drone operators in the Ukrainian military
- Unmanned Systems Forces of Russia
