= 424th Unmanned Systems Battalion (Ukraine) =

424th Unmanned Systems Battalion "SVAROG"
- Ukrainian: 424-й Окремий Батальйон Безпілотних Систем “SVAROG”
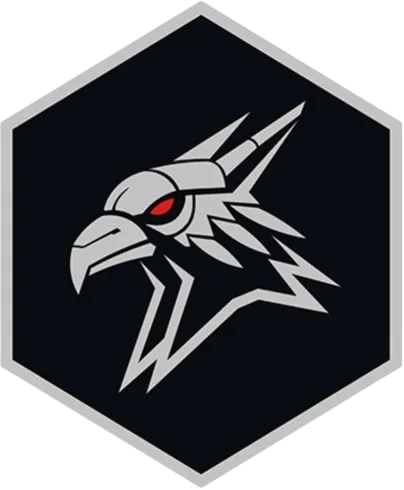
- Insignia
- Active: February 2022–present
- Country: Ukraine
- Allegiance: Ukraine
- Branch: Unmanned Systems Forces
- Type: Unmanned Systems
- Role: Aerial Reconnaissance, FPV drone strikes, Ground Drone Warfare, Cargo Transport
- Size: Battalion
- Engagements: Russo-Ukrainian war; 2022 Russian invasion of Ukraine

Insignia
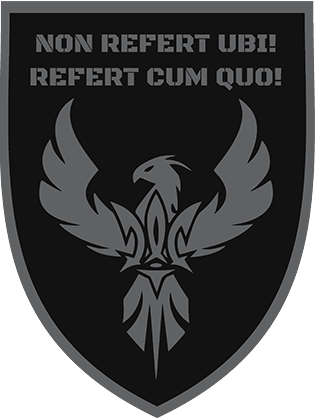
- Former Insignia

The 424th Unmanned Systems Battalion ('Svarog') is a battalion level military unit of the Ground Forces of Ukraine.

The Battalion was established in 2024 and has seen combat in the aftermath of the Russian invasion of Ukraine. It conducts drone warfare using both unmanned aerial vehicles (UAV) and unmanned ground vehicles (UGV).

== History ==
The battalion initially started as a unit of the Ukrainian Ground Forces, but was transferred to Unmanned Systems Forces in 2024.

In November 2024, it held a recruitment campaign in Kyiv.

On 29 June 2025, it destroyed Russian armored vehicles and artillery systems on the frontlines. On 19 July 2025, it destroyed a rare Russian experimental KOP-2 EW system with two drone hits. On 24 July 2025, it destroyed a Russian Msta-B howitzer along with a truck.
