= Chosen Company =

Swedish-Ukrainian volunteer company (2022–2025)

Chosen Company (2023–2025) 312th Swedish Volunteer Company (2022–2023)
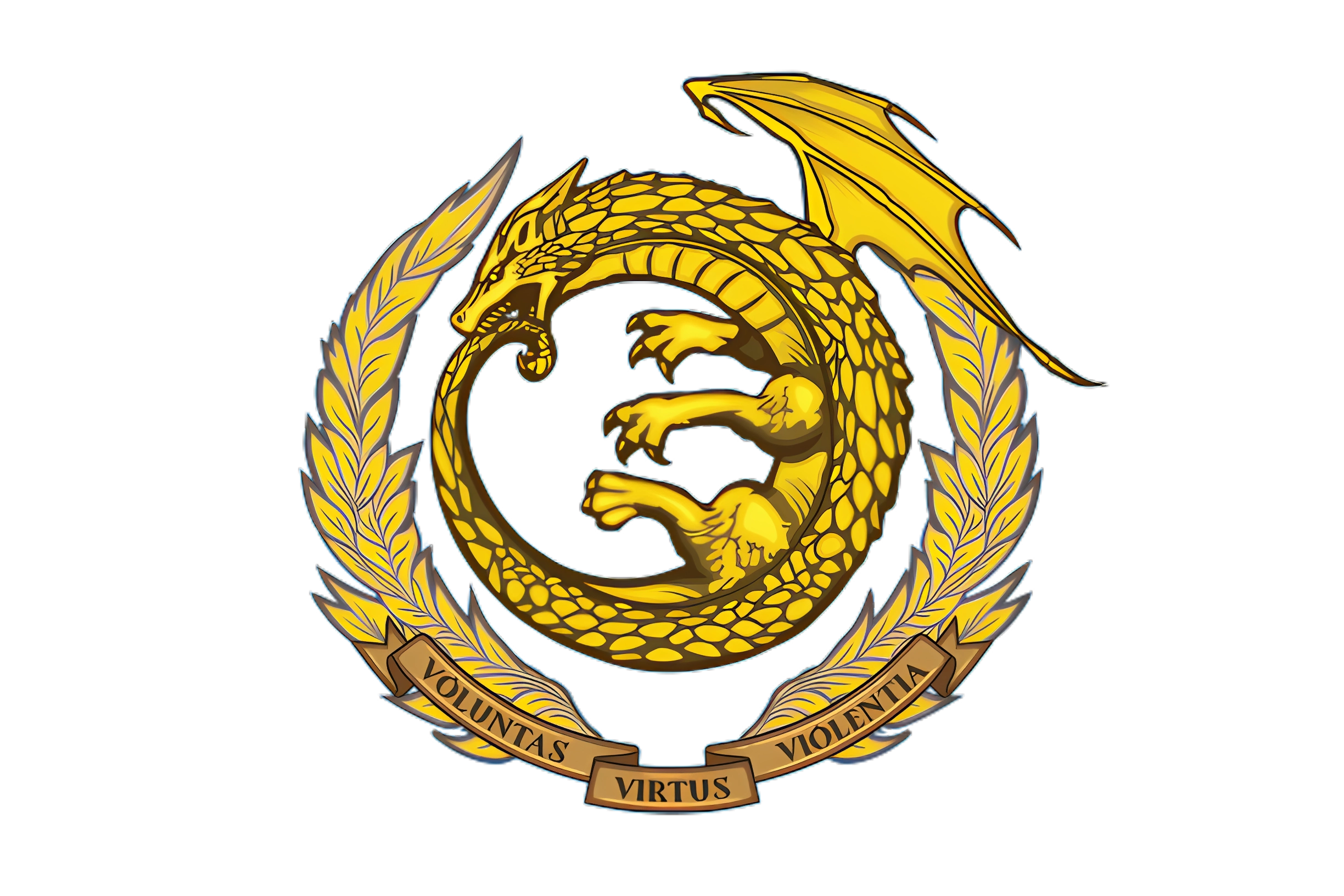
- Active: February 2022 – 26 May 2025
- Allegiance: Ukraine
- Branch: International Legion; Security Service of Ukraine
- Type: Foreign volunteer Company
- Role: Shock troops
- Size: Unknown
- Part of: 59th Motorized Brigade (2023–2024); 49th Special Purpose Detachment of the Security Service of Ukraine (2024–2025)
- Mottos: Voluntas, Virtus, Violentia
- Engagements: Russian Invasion of Ukraine; 2022 Kherson counteroffensive; 2023 Ukrainian counteroffensive
- Website: thechosencompany.org

Commanders
- Notable commanders: Ryan O'Leary; Edvard Selander Patrignani †

Chosen Company, previously known as the 312th Swedish Volunteer Company, was a volunteer unit fighting for Ukraine during the Russian invasion of Ukraine. Its volunteers came from over 31 countries, but were primarily citizens from the United States.

== History ==
The company was formed in 2022 during the Russian invasion of Ukraine as the 312th Swedish volunteer Company. It was led by Swedish military veteran Edvard Selander Patrignani under the international legion until his death in combat on 18 July 2022. After that the unit moved to the Kherson front and was placed under the 126th TDF. At the start of 2023, the company was renamed Chosen Company, to better represent the units multi-national composition and became attached to the 59th Motorized Brigade. The company fought in the 2023 Ukrainian counteroffensive. In October 2024, the unit joined the 49th Special Purpose Detachment of the Security Service of Ukraine. On 26 May 2025, O'Leary announced on X that Chosen Company had been disbanded, adding that he will release a statement after the end of his contract. Team Timekeeper, a group that tracks the deaths of foreign volunteers, asked O'Leary how many casualties the unit had taken under his command to which O'Leary replied, "12 KIA, around 60 WIA".

On 3 June 2025, O'Leary made a post on X where he criticized the Ukrainian government's treatment of foreign volunteers saying, "tens of thousands of foreigners have answered the call to defend Ukraine and yet they continue to have less legal standing in most areas than a foreigner in Ukraine on a 'edu visa/residency.' This same patchwork has removed the meritocracy of the military for foreigners as well and has effectively create a caste system in both civilian and military life for those serving in the military."

On 16 June 2025, O'Leary stated that he had disbanded the unit because of the poor quality, cronyism, and "Soviet-style thinking" of the Ukrainian officer corps, claiming that their leadership took more lives than Russian actions. He also accused the former commander of the 59th Assault Brigade, Bogdan Shevchuk, of sending intelligence officers with no combat experience on assault operations and sending troops to unreachable positions, which led to numerous deaths and injuries.

== Allegations of war crimes ==
In 2024, German medical officer Caspar Grosse spoke to the New York Times about three incidents where members of Chosen Company killed Russian POWs. The New York Times reported that all of Grosse's accounts "are bolstered by his contemporaneous notes, video footage and text messages exchanged by members of the unit and reviewed by The Times."

In the first alleged incident dated August 2023, a severely injured, unarmed Russian soldier was crawling through a trench and begging for help in a mix of broken English and Russian. The Russian was then allegedly shot in the chest by a member of Chosen Company. When the Russian soldier continued to move and breathe, another fighter shot him in the head. In the second incident, a Chosen member lobbed a grenade at and killed a Russian soldier who allegedly had his hands raised. Video evidence of the incident was reviewed by the New York Times. In the third incident, Chosen members boasted in a group chat about killing Russian prisoners of war during a mission in October, text messages show a soldier who was briefly in command that day alluded to the killings using a slang word for shooting. He said he would take responsibility, "If anything comes out about alleged POW blamming, I ordered it," wrote the soldier, who goes by the call sign Andok. He added an image of a Croatian war criminal who died in 2017 after drinking poison during a tribunal at The Hague and added the message "At the Hague 'I regret nothing!'" under the image. The New York Times reported that this it was "one of several text messages" that make reference, directly or obliquely, to killing prisoners.

Chosen Company's commander, Ryan O'Leary, denied that any of the incidents took place, and claimed the unit had offered 30 other videos to the New York Times providing all the footage of the alleged incidents, but the offer was ignored. O'Leary claimed the New York Times article amounted to "a tabloid hit piece" against him and the unit.

== Structure ==
As of July 2024 the company's structure is:

- 1st Rifle Platoon
- 2nd Rifle Platoon
- 3rd Recon Platoon
- 4th Drone Squad
- 5th Pioneer Squad
- 6th Support Platoon
