= Yurii Revera =

- Юрій Ігорович Ревера
- Born: 2000; Lviv, Ukraine
- Died: 2024 (aged 23–24); Donetsk region
- Military career
- Allegiance: Ukraine
- Branch: Ukrainian Ground Forces
- Rank: colonel
- Conflicts: Russo-Ukrainian War; 2022 Russian invasion of Ukraine
- Awards: Order for Courage

Yuriy Igorovich Revera (Ukrainian: Юрій Ігорович Ревера; (born June 20, 1973, Lviv - died August 27, 2024, Donetsk region) - Ukrainian historian and archaeologist, sailor of the Armed Forces of Ukraine, participant of the Russian-Ukrainian war, who died during the Russian invasion of Ukraine.

== Biography ==
He was born on June 20, 1973, in the city of Lviv. He received his higher education at the Ivan Franko National University of Lviv, Faculty of History, majoring in "History of Ukraine" (1998). While studying at the university, he worked in the periodicals department of the Vasyl Stefanyk Lviv National Scientific Library of the National Academy of Sciences of Ukraine (1993–1994), in his final years of study - he moved to the Museum of History of his alma mater, where he worked as an artist for the next 14 years (1995–2009).

Since 2008, he has worked as a historian, archaeologist, and junior research fellow at the Research Center "Rescue Archaeological Service" of the Institute of Archaeology of the National Academy of Sciences of Ukraine. He participated in archaeological expeditions. He was interested in numismatics. He knew Polish and Bulgarian well.

He was an active participant in the Revolution of Dignity. From the first days of the full-scale invasion, he joined the ranks of the Territorial Defense Forces, namely the 125th Separate Territorial Defense Brigade. Later, he continued his service in the 414th Separate Regiment of Strike Unmanned Aviation Systems of the Naval Forces of the Armed Forces of Ukraine. Call sign - "Graf".

Died on August 27, 2024, in the Donetsk region.
