= Drone wall =

Drone-based military tactic

A drone wall or drone line is a defensive line created by the offensive deployment of armed and reconnaissance drones. There is no physical wall as such, but the offensive capabilities of the drones are such, for that area, they block opposing troops from entering the area, thus create a no mans land.

The first appearance of a drone line occurred in The Ukraine-Russian war in mid 2025. Ukraine had built up their drone capabilities in terms of technology, offensive nature and numbers. At the same time, Russian troops were moving forward and attempting to take Ukrainian territory in the east.

This created the gradual situation, where Ukraine, with assistance from various countries and suppliers of drones, could gradually get a technological advantage and a numerical advantage over Russia's drones. They then deployed theirs in numbers, creating a "wall" of territory that targeted vehicles and infantry. Ukraine's drone wall was initially 5km to 10km in depth, but continued to expand.

The drones involved in the Kill zone not only attack individuals, but also attack logistic centres, which has traditionally been an issue for the Russian operation.

== Russian response ==
Vehicles were easily targeted, so Russia responded to drone attacks by sending in small teams. However, with the drone coverage being so comprehensive, the small teams were also attacked. The eventual result of this was a slowing of the Russian gains, by May 2026, Russian gains had almost slowed to standstill. Russia later began to experiment with improving its UAS forces and has established its own drone line by late 2025.

== Alternate drone walls ==
The use of the drone wall has inspired other countries, in particular Europe, the US, and Australia to consider the concept.
