= Serhii Kotenko =

Ukrainian soldier (1967–2022)

- Born: Serhii Leonidovych Kotenko; 16 July 1967; Haisyn, Vinnytsia Oblast, Ukrainian SSR, USSR
- Died: 9 March 2022 (aged 54) near Zaporizhzhia, Zaporizhzhia Oblast, Ukraine
- Military career
- Allegiance: Ukraine
- Branch: Ukrainian Ground Forces
- Service years: 1989–2022
- Rank: Colonel
- Conflicts: Russo-Ukrainian War; War in Donbas; Russian invasion of Ukraine; Southern Ukraine campaign †
- Awards: Order of Bohdan Khmelnytsky; Order of the Gold Star (posthumously)

Serhii Leonidovych Kotenko (Ukrainian: Сергій Леонідович Котенко; 16 July 1967 – 9 March 2022) was a Ukrainian military officer and participant in the Russian invasion of Ukraine who posthumously received the Hero of Ukraine on 16 March 2022. Prior to the war, he was head of the Haisyn District State Administration (2014–2015) and Commander of the 9th Separate Motorized Infantry Battalion.

== Biography ==
Serhii Kotenko was born in Haisyn, Vinnytsia Oblast. He graduated from Kamianets-Podilskyi Higher Military Engineering Command School in 1989. He served in the army for 22 years. In 2014–2015, he headed the Haisyn Regional State Administration, and later returned to military service. He was the commander of the 9th Separate Motorized Infantry Battalion "Vinnytsia Scythians".

From 24 February 2022, he took part in the Russo-Ukrainian War, redeploying his forces to Vasylivka in the Zaporizhzhia Oblast. He died on 9 March 2022, in a battle with Russian forces near Zaporizhzhia. He was buried on 11 March in the town of Haisyn, Vinnytsia region. Two days earlier, his brother Oleksandr Kotenko (October 23, 1971 – March 7, 2022), serving in the Aidar Battalion, was killed in action near Mykolaiv.

In December 2022 a street in Kyiv that was named after Russian general Alexander Suvorov was renamed to Serhii Kotenko Street.

== Awards ==
- The title of "Hero of Ukraine" with the deigning Order of the Golden Star (2022, posthumously) for personal courage and heroism shown in defending the state sovereignty and territorial integrity of Ukraine, loyalty to the military oath.
- Order of Bohdan Khmelnytsky III degree (2019) for significant personal merits in defending the state sovereignty and territorial integrity of Ukraine, civic courage, dedication to upholding the constitutional principles of democracy, human rights and freedoms, significant contribution to cultural and educational development, active volunteering.
