= 59th Assault Brigade =

Ukrainian Ground Forces unit

- 59-та штурмова бригада
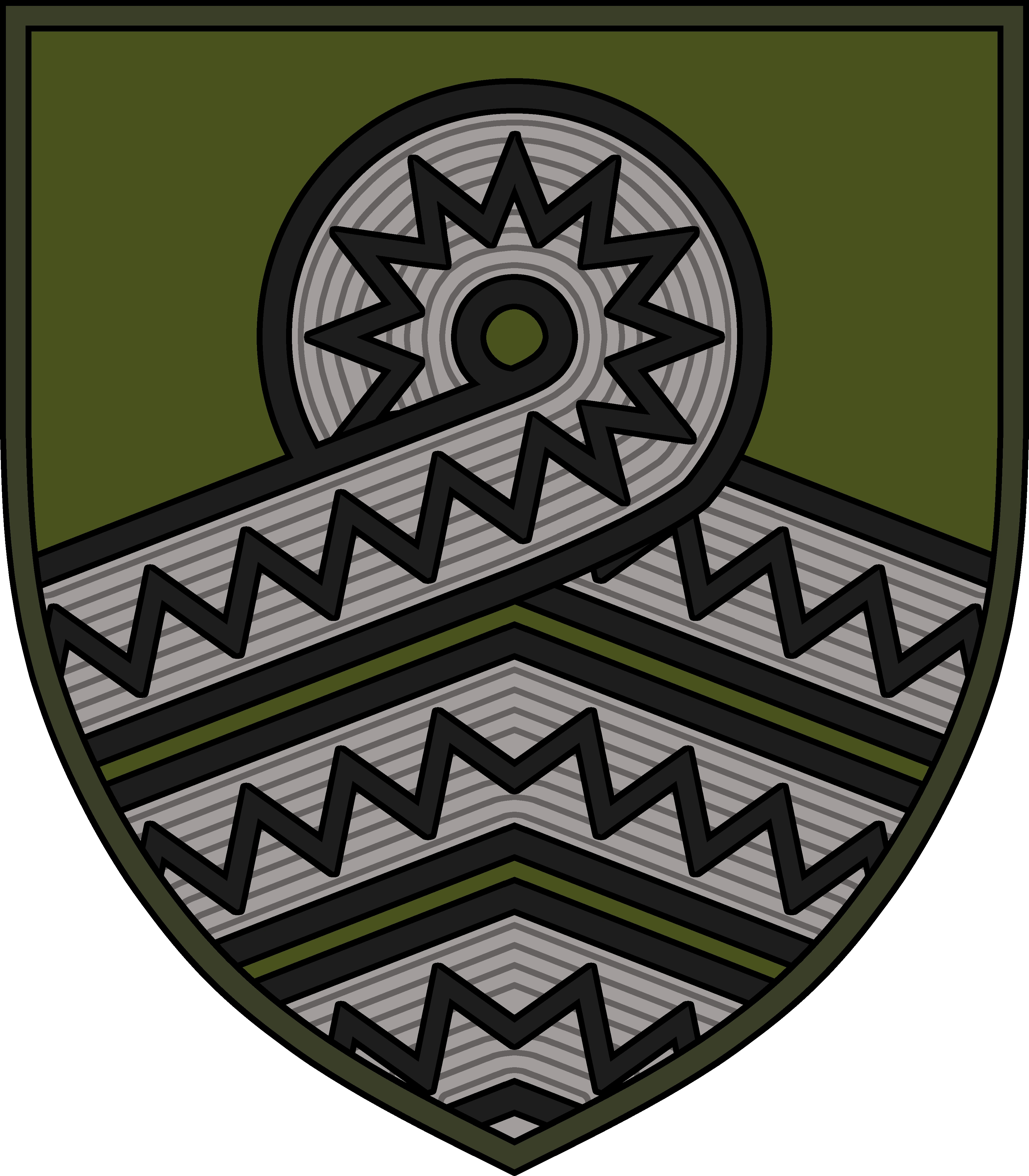
- Insignia of the brigade
- Active: 8 December 2014 – present
- Country: Ukraine
- Branch: Ukrainian Ground Forces (2014–2025); Unmanned Systems Forces
- Role: Assault Infantry
- Size: 1,500 – 10,000
- Garrison/HQ: Haisyn, Vinnytsia Oblast
- Patron: Yakov Handziuk
- Motto: To victory
- Engagements: Russo-Ukrainian war; Southern Ukraine campaign; Battle of Kherson; Battle of Mykolaiv; Eastern Ukraine campaign; Battle of Donbas; Battle of Bakhmut; Battle of Avdiivka; Pokrovsk offensive
- Website: Official Website

Commanders
- Current commander: Col. Oleksandr Sak

Insignia
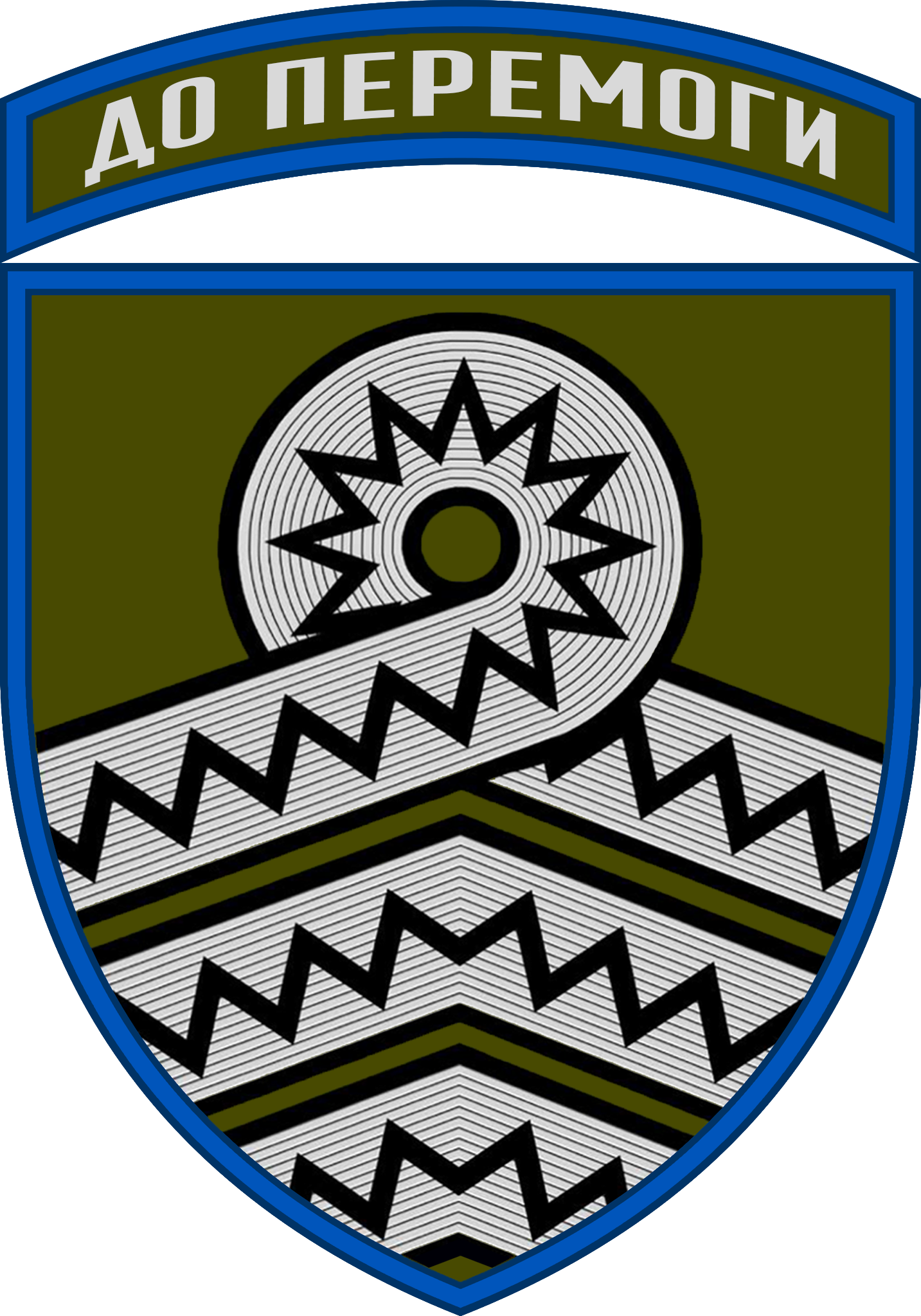
- Former insignia (2020-2024)

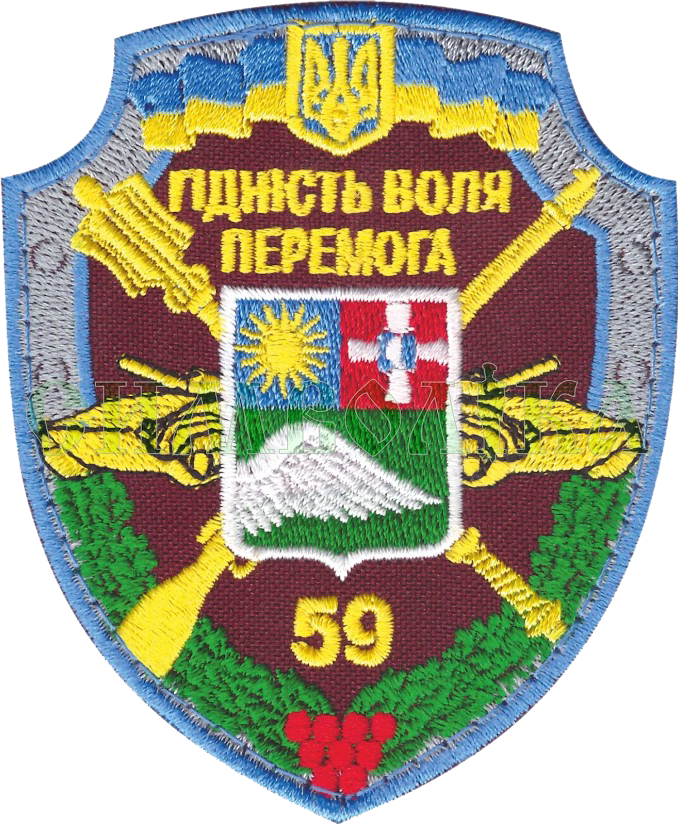
- Former insignia (2014-2020)

The 59th Assault Brigade named after Yakov Handziuk (Ukrainian: 59-та окрема штурмова бригада імені Якова Гандзюка) is a brigade of the Unmanned Systems Forces in Ukraine.

== History ==
=== Formation and Early Recognition ===
The 59th Motorized Brigade was established in 2014 as part of the Ukrainian Ground Forces. On 24 August 2015, Ukraine’s Independence Day, the brigade received its battle flag and became fully operational, and on 8 December 2016, the commander of Operational Command South named the 59th Brigade the "best motorized brigade in the Ukrainian Armed Forces" based on performance evaluations from 2015.

=== Response to the 2022 Invasion and Operations in the South ===
At the start of the invasion in February 2022, the main units of the 59th Brigade were stationed in the Oleshky Sands area, directly in the path of Russian forces advancing from Crimea. Facing overwhelming numbers, most of the brigade conducted a strategic withdrawal across the Dnieper River to Mykolaiv, where it joined the defense of the city. Meanwhile, the 9th "Vinnytsia Scythians" Battalion was dispatched to secure Melitopol in the initial hours of the invasion. Its commander, Serhii Kotenko, was later killed in action near Zaporizhzhia on 9 March 2022. In Mykolaiv Oblast, units of the 59th Brigade played a critical role in liberating several settlements, including Shevchenkove, Kotliareve, Zelenyi Hai, Olenivka, and Kostiantynivka, villages east of Mykolaiv that had been temporarily occupied during the early phase of the invasion. From mid-March 2022, elements of the brigade held frontline positions in Posad-Pokrovske, Kherson Oblast, alongside the 28th Mechanized Brigade. As Ukrainian forces pushed forward during the southern counteroffensive, on the night of 9 November 2022, units of the 59th advanced into Zelenyi Hai. Two days later, on 11 November, footage emerged showing soldiers from the 9th Battalion raising the Ukrainian flag in the village of Blahodatne, symbolizing the liberation of the area following Russia’s withdrawal from the right bank of the Dnipro River.

=== Combat in Donetsk, Foreign Volunteers, and Later Operations ===
Following this success, the brigade was redeployed to the Donetsk Oblast front, particularly near the heavily contested town of Pisky, just west of Donetsk City. A drone unit attached to the 59th Brigade participated in the Battle of Bakhmut, operating under the command of Robert Brovdi, a prominent figure in Ukraine’s drone warfare efforts. Throughout summer 2023, the brigade remained engaged on the Donetsk front. Units, including the 11th Battalion, were positioned along the Pisky–Pervomaiske axis. By 8 September 2023, after fierce fighting, Ukrainian forces from the 59th Brigade cleared Russian troops from parts of the ruined settlement of Opytne, reestablishing Ukrainian control over portions of the area. A notable foreign element within the brigade is Chosen Company a volunteer assault detachment composed of fighters from the United States, Australia, and other countries. Originally part of the International Legion of Territorial Defense, the unit was later integrated into the reconnaissance company of the 59th Brigade. It participated in reconnaissance and direct assault operations during the 2023 Ukrainian counteroffensive. However, in 2024, a New York Times investigation reported allegations that members of Chosen Company had killed Russian prisoners of war, based on testimonies from former members. By July 2024, the brigade was deployed near Krasnohorivka, Donetsk Oblast, a key location close to the embattled city of Donetsk. During this period, Commander-in-Chief Oleksandr Syrskyi ordered an inspection of the 59th Brigade amid growing concerns over combat losses and accusations of misconduct against its commander, Colonel Bohdan Shevchuk, who had been appointed in April 2024. In November 2024, the brigade was redeployed near Pokrovsk, a strategically important fortress city. It was tasked with halting a Russian breakthrough along the Zhovte–Novotroyitske–Shevchenko line. However, the mission failed. Soldiers from the brigade reported being overstretched, under-resourced, and given unrealistic orders under extreme pressure.

=== Transfer to Unmanned Systems Forces and new Role ===
On 3 January 2025, the 59th Brigade underwent a major transformation: it was reorganized as an assault brigade and officially transferred from the Ground Forces to the Unmanned Systems Forces. In May 2025, further leadership changes took place. The brigade’s commander, Lieutenant Colonel Bohdan Shevchuk, was dismissed and replaced by Colonel Oleksandr Sak.

On 29 September 2025, the 59th Assault Brigade destroyed a Mi-8, near the village of Kotliarivka, Pokrovsk district, Donetsk Oblast. Using a $500 fpv drone, according to the Ukrainian commander of the Unmanned Systems Forces (and himself once a subordinate commander in the brigade) Major Robert Brovdi.

== Structure ==
As of 2025, the brigade's structure was as following:

- 59th Assault Brigade
  - Brigade Headquarters & Headquarters Company
  - 1st Battalion of Unmanned Systems
  - 2nd Battalion of Unmanned Systems
  - 2nd Rifle Battalion
  - 3rd Rifle Battalion
  - 10th Assault Battalion
  - 11th Assault Battalion
  - 108th Assault Battalion
  - Specialized Rifle Battalion Shkval
  - Tank Battalion
  - Artillery Group
  - Anti-Aircraft Defense Battalion
  - Reconnaissance Company
  - Support Battalion
  - Engineer Battalion
  - Maintenance Battalion
  - Logistic Battalion
  - Signal Company
  - Radar Company
  - Medical Company
  - CBRN Protection Company
  - Civil-Military Cooperation
