= Timeline of the Russo-Ukrainian war (1 June 2026 – 31 August 2026) =

Timeline of the Russo-Ukrainian war (2022–present)
- Prelude; (up to 23 February 2022); Initial invasion; (24 February – 7 April 2022); Southeastern front; (8 April – 28 August 2022); 2022 Ukrainian counteroffensives; (29 August – 11 November 2022); Second stalemate; (12 November 2022 – 7 June 2023); 2023 Ukrainian counteroffensive; (8 June 2023 – 31 August 2023); 2023 Ukrainian counteroffensive, cont.; (1 September – 30 November 2023); 2023–2024 winter campaigns; (1 December 2023 – 31 March 2024); 2024 spring and summer campaigns; (1 April – 31 July 2024); 2024 summer–autumn offensives; (1 August – 31 December 2024); 2025 winter–spring offensives; (1 January 2025 – 31 May 2025); 2025 summer offensives; (1 June 2025 – 31 August 2025); 2025 autumn–winter offensives; (1 September 2025 – 31 December 2025); 2026 winter–spring offensives; (1 January 2026 – 31 May 2026); 2026 summer offensives; (1 June 2026 – 31 August 2026); 2026 autumn–winter offensives; (1 September 2026 – present)

This timeline of the Russo-Ukrainian war covers the period from 1 June to 31 August 2026.

== June 2026 ==
=== 1 June ===
One person was killed in a Ukrainian drone strike on Pushkarnoye, Belgorod Oblast.

=== 2 June ===
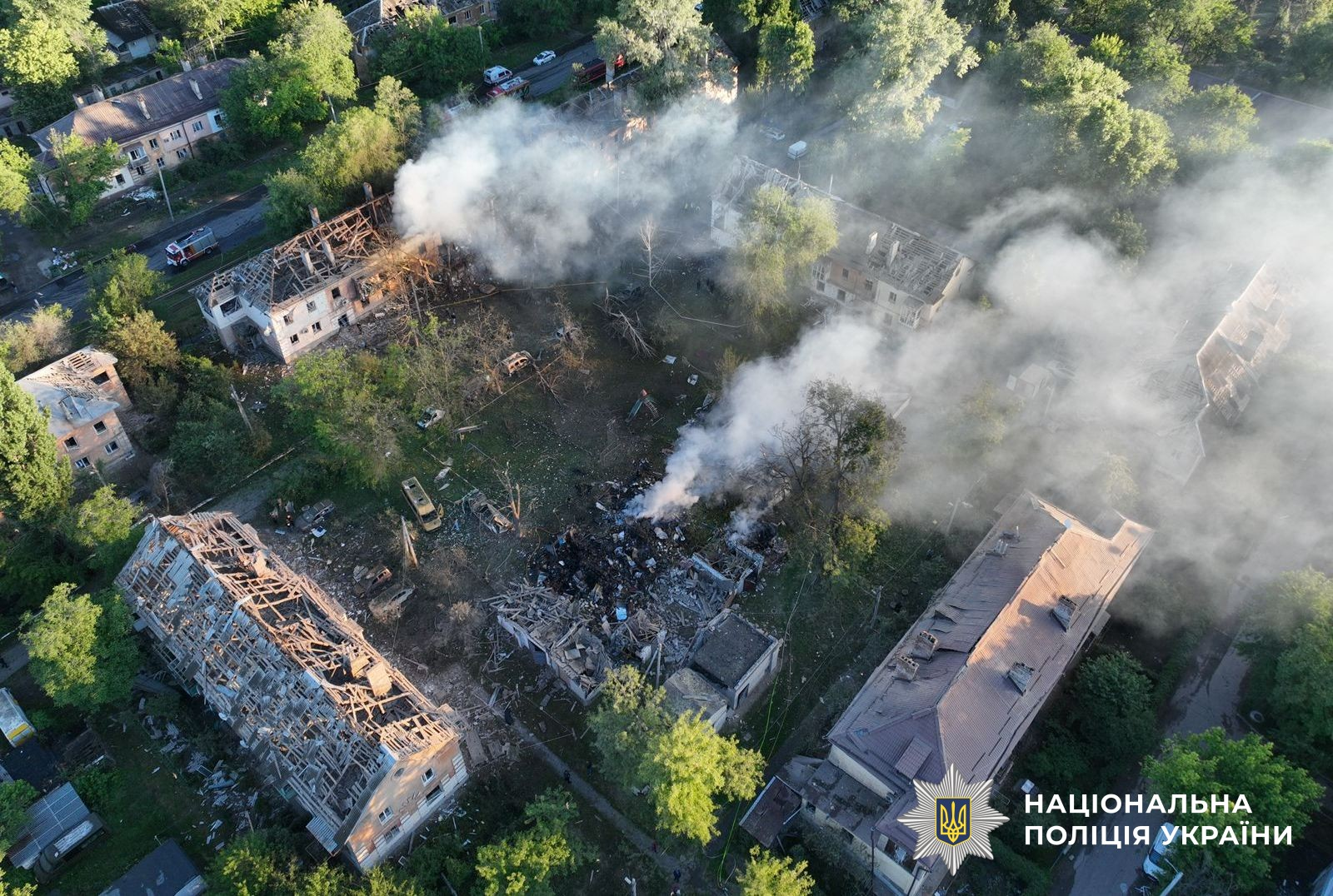
Destroyed and damaged residential buildings in Dnipro after the attack on 2 June

Russia launched a wave of missile and drone attacks on cities across Ukraine, killing 24 people and injuring 130 others. Seventeen of the dead came from Dnipro, while seven deaths occurred in Kyiv.

Ukrainian drones set the Ilsky oil refinery on fire.

=== 3 June ===
Seven people were killed in a Ukrainian drone strike on a bus in Yenakiieve, Donetsk Oblast. Two people were killed following a fire caused by a separate attack in Smolensk Oblast.

The Saint Petersburg Oil Terminal was attacked resulting in a fire. Leningrad Oblast Governor Aleksandr Drozdenko claimed 50 drones were shot down. Flights from Pulkovo Airport were suspended. The JSC Progress in Michurinsk was set ablaze by Ukrainian drones. The facility builds control systems for aviation and missile as well as gas and oil pipelines. The corvette Boikiy was struck by at least two drones resulting in "large-scale fire on the ship's superstructure".

=== 4 June ===
In Crimea, three people were killed in a Ukrainian drone strike on Simferopol, while another was killed following in a separate attack on a train traveling from Azovske to Kerch. A Russian Svetlyak-class patrol boat in Yurkyne was struck by a Ukrainian drone.

Ukrainian drones struck Russian forces at Donetsk International Airport, to stop the launch of "Shahed-type UAVs". Ukrainian drones attacked the Elastik gunpowder factory in Ryazan Oblast.

The International Atomic Energy Agency noted a "heavy attack" on the Zaporizhzhia Nuclear Power Plant.

In an open letter to his Russian counterpart, President Zelenskyy claimed that Russian casualties in May had "once again" exceeded 30,000 personnel, with 63% being killed and 37% being wounded. However, he stressed that Ukrainian losses were also heavy. "We are losing our people, and every loss is painful to us. Even when the ratio of Ukrainian losses to Russian losses is one to five or one to six, it still matters greatly".

=== 5 June ===
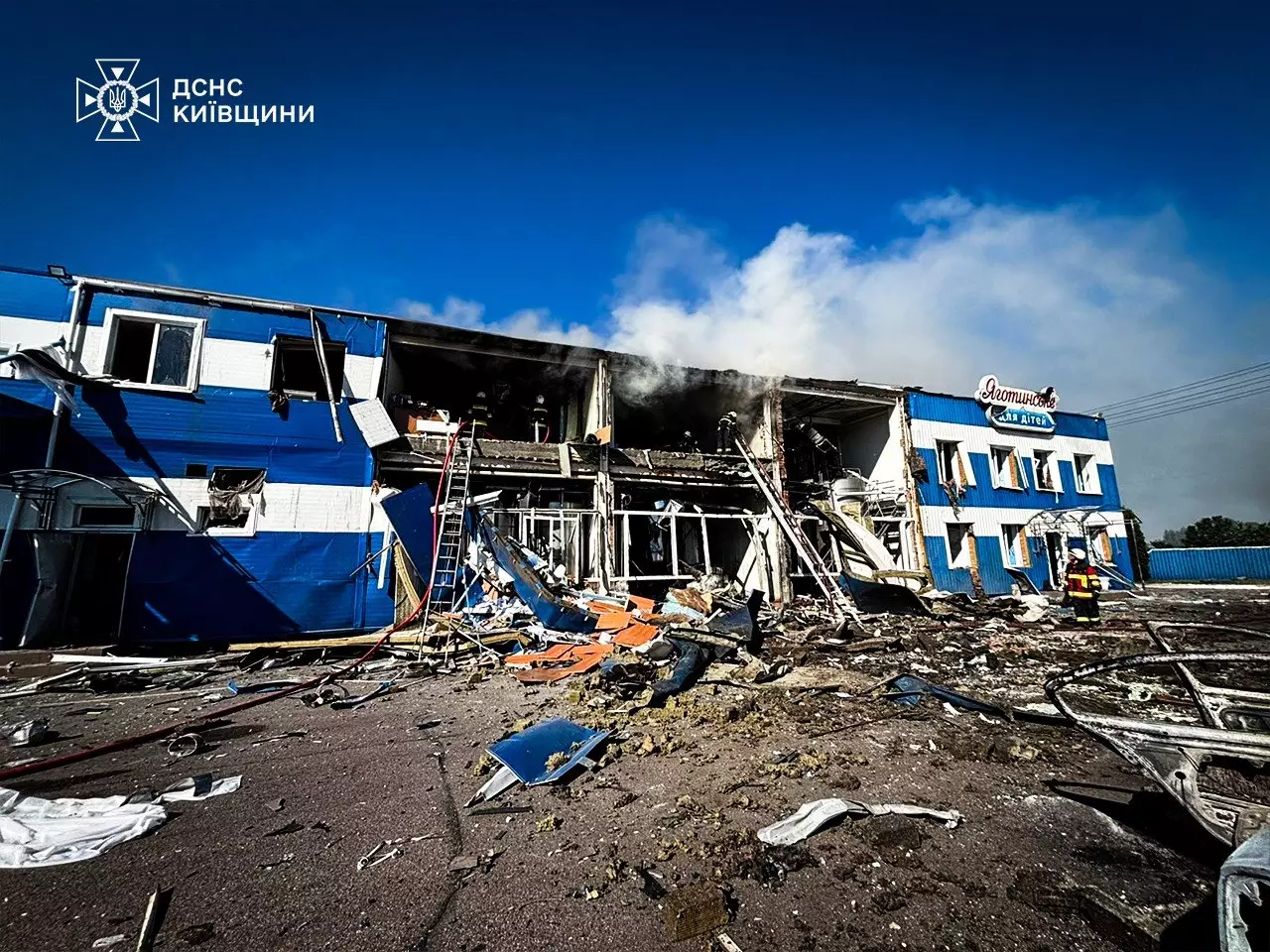
Baby food plant in Kyiv Oblast after drone attack on 5 June

Ukrainian drones struck two locomotives near Rozdolne and Vladyslavovka in Crimea. Ukrainian drones set fire to an oil depot in Luhansk. Ukrainian drones struck five vessels in the ports of Mariupol and Berdyansk. Five Azerbaijani crew members were killed in strikes on the commercial vessels Natra and Zircon in Taganrog Bay, while one person was killed in a separate attack in Otradovsky, Belgorod Oblast. The Turkish-flagged fishing boat Duru 67 was attacked and sunk off Sevastopol, killing one sailor and injuring four others.

A stray Ukrainian naval drone exploded in the Romanian port of Constanța, prompting the evacuation of more than 1,300 people. The Romanian government blamed the incident on electronic interference by Russia.

Ukraine and Russia conducted a prisoner swap, both sides exchanging 185 POWs each through mediation of the United Arab Emirates.

The Head of the Republic of Kalmykia, Batu Khasikov, announced that a Kalmyk recipient of the Hero of Russia medal, Naran Ochir-Goryaev, was killed in the fighting in Ukraine.

=== 6 June ===
The city of Kronstadt was attacked by Ukrainian drones, according to locals the Kronstadt Marine Plant was attacked with smoke rising from the area. The Ukrainian military and the SBU estimated 5,000 tons of ammunition was destroyed. An oil depot in Ust-Labinsk was attacked by drones as was port infrastructure in Mariupol.

=== 7 June ===
Russo-Ukrainian war June 2026
Kherson Oblast and Crimea bridge attacks
In June 2026 Ukraine has regularly used drones to target Russian supply line bridges connecting Kherson Oblast and Crimea, over the North Crimean Canal, and along the M14, M17 M18 motorways of Ukraine, two of which have been called a Highway of Death.
1 Chonhar road bridge
2 Chonhar rail bridge
3 Stavky [uk] road bridge
4 Armiansk road bridge
5 Myrne road bridge
6 Preobrazhenka [uk] bridge
7 Henichesk bridge
8 Henichesk bridge
9 Novoazovsk road bridge
10 Voinka road bridge
11 Rozdolne [uk] road bridge
12 Rozdolne [uk] rail bridge
13 Volodymyrivka [uk] road bridge
14 Kremenivka [uk] road bridge

The Centralized Spent Nuclear Fuel Storage Facility in the Chernobyl exclusion zone was partially damaged in a Russian drone strike.

The Chonhar Bridge connecting Crimea with mainland Ukraine was damaged in a Ukrainian drone strike. Drones from the Ukrainian Special Operations Forces struck the oil depots at Semykolodezyanska and Feodosia, both in Crimea.

Atesh claimed to have carried out a sabotage attack on railway infrastructure in Voronezh.

=== 8 June ===
A FP-1 drone struck the Protasovo airfield in Ryazan Oblast. A fuel depot in Crimea was attacked by drones, as was oil transportation infrastructure in Volgograd Oblast and a radar in Krasnodar Krai. A drone attack on a locomotive killed an assistant driver and wounded another, part of the Moscow–Simferopol line in Crimea, leading to a suspension of services. Ukrainian drones set the electrical substation in Alchevsk, Luhansk Oblast, on fire. An oil depot in Novorossiysk was set on fire by drones. One person was killed in a Ukrainian drone strike on Malinovka, Belgorod Oblast.

A drone was shot down by French fighter jets belonging to a NATO contingent over Latvian airspace. The incident was blamed by the Latvian Army on Russian interference. Wreckage of a Ukrainian drone was found in Moldova, near the settlement of Lopatna.

The National Police of Ukraine said it had arrested a resident of Kyiv on suspicion of plotting to assassinate HUR spokesperson Andriy Yusov on behalf of Russia.

=== 9 June ===
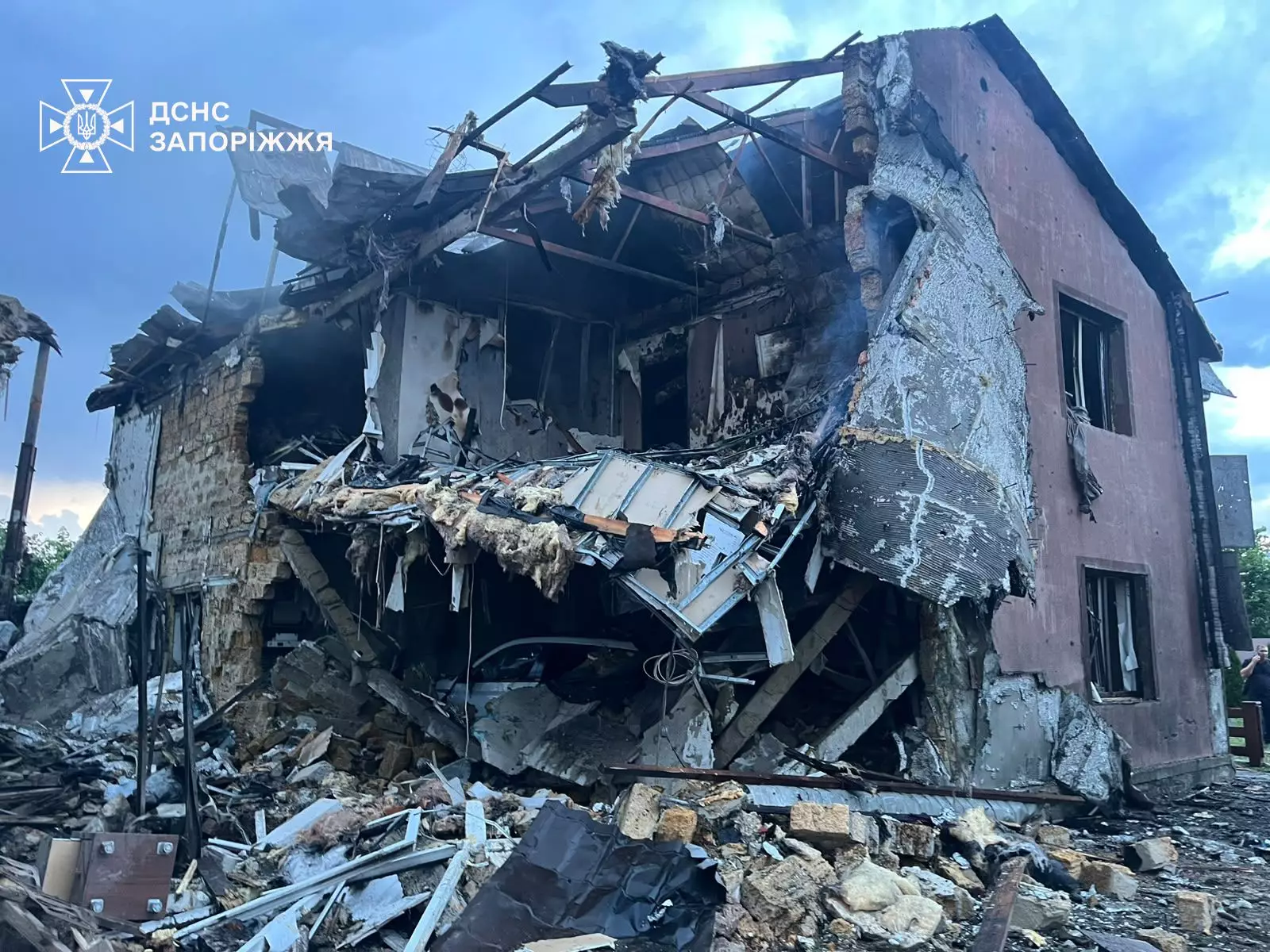
House in Vilniansk, Zaporizhzhia Oblast, after drone strike on 9 June

Three people were killed in a Russian missile attack on Chuhuiv, Kharkiv Oblast.

Ukrainian drones struck the Chonhar Bridge for a second time. Damir Davydov, lieutenant general and head of Russia's Main Missile and Artillery Directorate, was killed by a car bomb explosion in Balashikha, Moscow Oblast. A gas pipeline in Dagestan exploded, with the Ukrainian Center for Countering Disinformation posting about the incident on Telegram.

The new Bulgarian government announced it would stop supplying weapons to Ukraine.

=== 10 June ===
The VNIIR-Progress plant in Cheboksary was attacked by Flamingo missiles, wounding three. Ukrainian drones also attacked an oil refinery in Samara Oblast as well as two oil pumping stations at Vtorovo and Lobkovo.

=== 11 June ===
Map of the area of bridge strikes near the North Crimean Canal and Kherson and Crimea border

The Afipsky oil refinery was attacked by Ukrainian drones, starting a fire. Ukrainian drones damaged four bridges in Kherson Oblast: one near Stavky, the road bridge between Perekop and Armiansk, and bridges near Myrne and Preobrazhenka, both over the North Crimean Canal. According to the 1st Separate Assault Regiment Da Vinci, the attack on the Armiansk bridge destroyed 50 Russian vehicles. Ukrainian Neptune missiles struck a Black Sea Fleet ammunition dump located at Strilets'ka Bay.

Ukrainian backed partisans, along with the Freedom of Russia Legion, blew up Russian railway cars in Taldom, carrying over some 10,000 metric tons of oil, code named Operation Barrel.

=== 12 June ===
The Nizhnekamskneftekhim (NKNK) synthetic rubber plant, in Nizhnekamsk, was attacked by Ukrainian drones with a "large fire" breaking out. The Togliatti Kauchuk petrochemical plant, in Tolyatti, was attacked by drones leading plumes of black smoke over the site.

=== 13 June ===
Ukrainian drones struck port infrastructure at Temryuk, killing one person. Ukrainian drones struck the electrical substation in Yany Kapu and the Titan substation near Armiansk. The Yefimovka oil pumping station was attacked by Ukrainian drones, resulting in a fire that was detected by NASA's FIRMS.

Andrey Pinchuk, a commander of BARS-13 and former state security minister of the Donetsk People's Republic, survived an assassination attempt involving a parcel bomb.

=== 14 June ===
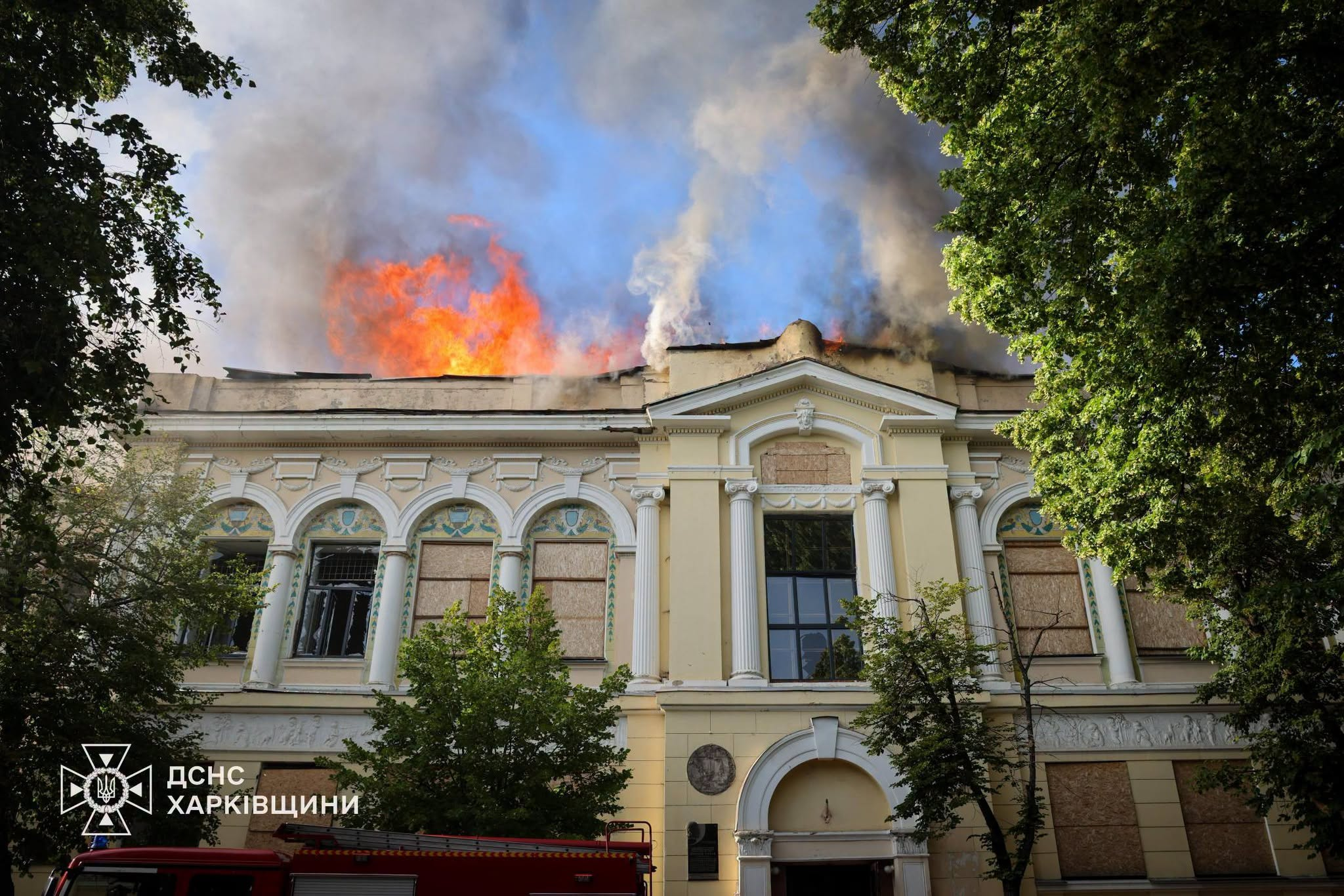
Kharkiv Art Museum after Russian strike on 14 June

Britain intercepted a Russian shadow fleet oil tanker trying to cross the English Channel.

Ukrainian drones struck the Azot chemical plant in Novomoskovsk, setting it ablaze. In Rybinsk, Ukrainian drones struck an oil depot used as a strategic fuel reserve for the Russian military.

=== 15 June ===
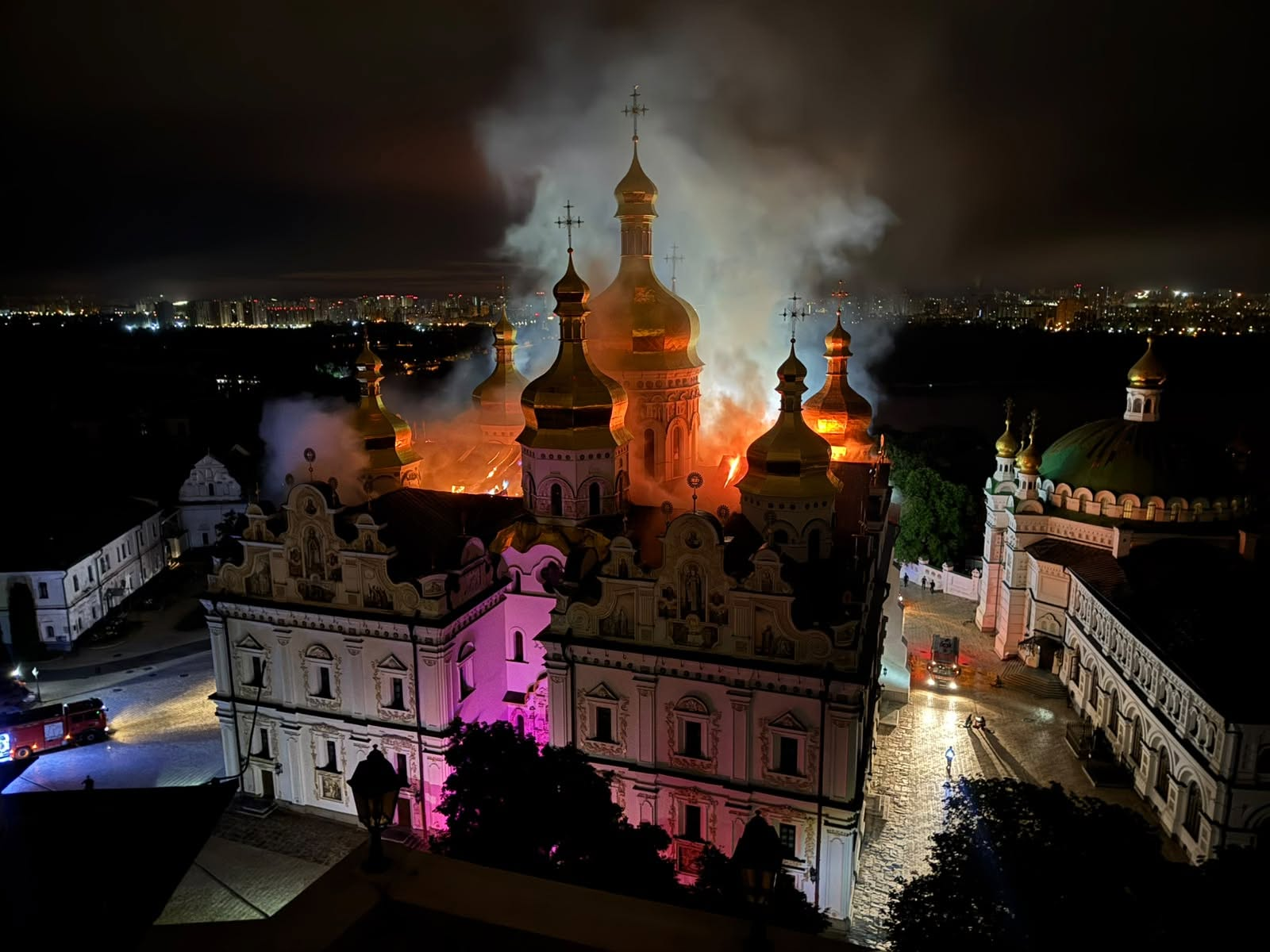
Dormition Cathedral of Kyiv Pechersk Lavra after the strike

Nine people were killed in Russian strikes on Kyiv, Kharkiv, and Dnipro. A large number of cultural sites and institutions were damaged, including the Dormition Cathedral and Museum of Historical Treasures of Ukraine in Kyiv Pechersk Lavra, Dovzhenko Film Studios (destroying the largest and oldest costume collection in the country), Mystetskyi Arsenal, Palace "Ukraine", Kyiv National Karpenko-Kary University, Kharkiv Art Museum, and Dnipro House of Organ and Chamber Music.

Ukrainian drones attacked a bridge near Chonhar, forcing the closure of the Dzhankoi road checkpoint. A bridge between Henichesk and the Arabat Spit was also damaged. Ukrainian drones destroyed a Russian Starlink jamming site in southern Ukraine. A bridge in Novoazovsk, over the Hruzkyi Yelanchyk River, was struck by Ukrainian drones while trucks passed over.

=== 16 June ===
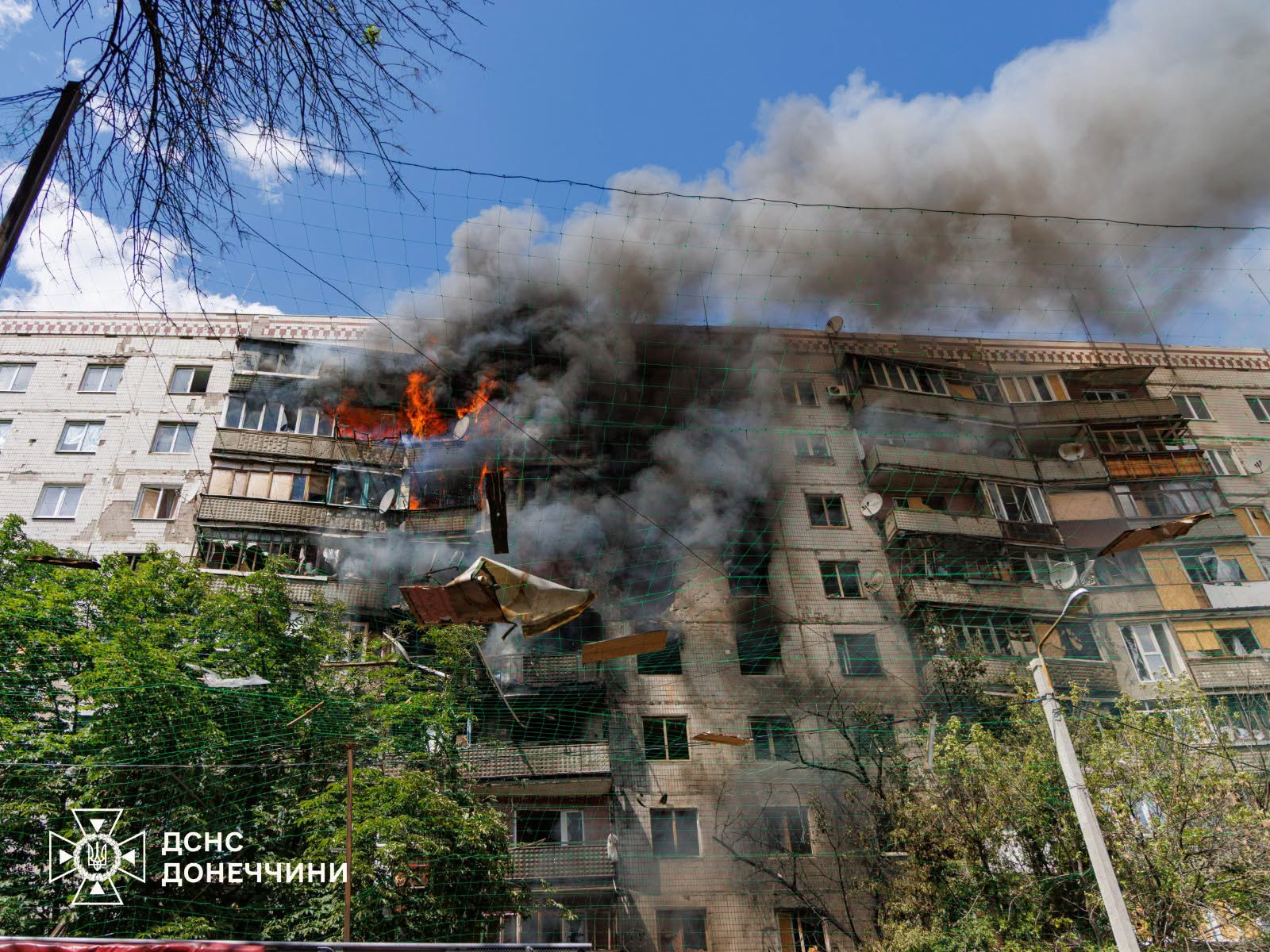
Apartment building in Kramatorsk, Donetsk Oblast, after drone strike on 16 June. Anti-drone net covering the street is seen.

An oil depot in Poltavskaya was set on fire by Ukrainian drones. The Moscow Refinery was set on fire by Ukrainian FP‑1, Liutyi, and Shahed-type drones.

A Ukrainian Su-24 assigned to the 7th Tactical Aviation Brigade crashed in Khmelnytskyi Oblast while on a combat mission, killing the pilot and the navigator.

=== 17 June ===
Ten people, including a sailor, were killed in Russian attacks on Donetsk, Kherson, and Zaporizhzhia oblasts.

Belarus and Russia accused Ukraine of carrying out a drone strike in Bryansk Oblast that hit a bus carrying members of Belarusian youth football team, killing one person and injuring six others.

=== 18 June ===
Fire at the Moscow Oil Refinery on 18 June

Ukrainian drones attacked the Moscow Refinery, starting a fire. Russian officials claimed that 17 people were injured, including two children, in the attack involving nearly 1,000 drones and four cruise missiles. An oil depot in Gukovo was set on fire by Ukrainian forces, the Rostov governor claimed one person had been killed and two injured during the attack. A railway bridge across the North Crimean Canal, near Rozdolne, was attacked by Ukrainian drones.

=== 19 June ===
Eleven people, including a sailor, were killed in Russian attacks on Dnipropetrovsk, Donetsk, Sumy, Kherson, Odesa and Kharkiv oblasts.

Anton Milaev, the adoptive great-grandson of former Soviet leader Leonid Brezhnev, was confirmed to have been captured by Ukrainian forces.

=== 20 June ===
Two people were killed in Russian airstrikes on Kharkiv. Separate attacks killed three people in Dnipropetrovsk and Poltava oblasts. Five people were killed in airstrikes in Zaporizhzhia.

Ukrainian drones attacked the road bridge over the Henichesk Strait. Atesh partisans claimed to have set fire to an electrical substation in Taganrog, connected to the "Atlant-Aero" which manufactures UAVs for the Russian military. The Antipinsky refinery was set ablaze by Ukrainian drones. Port Kavkaz was also attacked, resulting in a fire. The Russian ferry Panagia was attacked by Ukrainian drones, having been used to transport military equipment to Crimea. An oil depot in Kerch was also attacked by drones, with the aim of disrupting the infrastructure at both ends of the Crimean Bridge.

=== 21 June ===
Four people were killed in Ukrainian attacks across Crimea, which also forced a suspension of sales at petrol stations in the region.

The Dubna Space Communications Center, located in Dubna, was attacked by Ukrainian forces, resulting in "heavy smoke" being seen over the facility.

=== 22 June ===
Ten people, including an Egyptian sailor, were killed in Russian attacks on Donetsk, Sumy, Zaporizhzhia, Kherson, Odesa and Kharkiv oblasts.

The Ukrainian Air Force struck the Voronezh Semiconductor Devices Plant with Storm Shadow missiles. The plant manufactures electronics for cruise missiles and the Pantsir-S1 air-defense system. Five people were killed in the attack. A Russian Pantsir-S2 was destroyed in Zaporizhzhia Oblast by HUR drones.

=== 23 June ===
Four people were killed in a Russian missile attack on Kryvyi Rih.

Ukrainian missiles struck the Alekseevka chalk plant in Belgorod. A thermal power plant in Kerch was struck, "leaving half of Crimea without electricity", satellite imagery showed a smoke plume some 47 km (29 mi) long.

=== 24 June ===
Multiple Ukrainian strikes were reported on Crimea. A railway station near Kirovske was attacked and houses were damaged in Sevastopol. The Ukrainian smart bomb, the Equalizer, was used in combat. Ukrainian drones killed two people in Nizhny Novgorod Oblast. An industrial facility, several cars and private homes were damaged. The Orenburg Gas Processing Plant was attacked by Ukrainian drones.

Four people were injured by a Russian strike on a utility company in Zaporizhzhia Raion. Russian forces attacked gas stations and production facilities belonging to Naftogaz in Zaporizhzhia, Mykolaiv, Dnipropetrovsk and Poltava oblasts, injuring one person.

The Freedom of Russia Legion, as part of the HUR, disabled six oil distribution sites in Moscow and Tver oblasts.

=== 25 June ===
Zelenskyy approved a 40-day influence operation of long-range, mid-range and SBU operations to push Russia toward ending the war.

Ukrainian strikes hit an oil depot in Krasnodar Krai and two oil refineries in Ufa. Ukrainian drones damaged a road bridge in Zaporizhzhia Oblast, over the Aidar River and two railroad bridges over Luhanchyk River in Luhansk Oblast. Four people were killed in Ukrainian attacks on Crimea and Bryansk Oblast.

The Czech Republic sent 10 ALTO NG aircraft to Ukraine in order to train Air Force pilots.

Russia announced that from 8 July 2026, some 11 train routes over the Kerch Bridge will be cancelled, leaving only seven train routes a day, to and from Crimea, in service.

Ukrainian forces raised a flag over the Kinburn Spit for the first time since March 2022.

The commander of the Ukrainian 425th Assault Regiment, Lieutenant Colonel Yurii Harkavyi, was suspended from duty while under investigation for the non-combat death of 26 of the unit's soldiers between late 2025 and spring 2026 after an investigation by Babel.

=== 26 June ===
The Mayor of Moscow claimed that Ukraine launched "dozens of drones" at Moscow, with some 39 intercepted. Ukrainian drones struck energy infrastructure in western Tula Oblast and a chemical plant in Novomoskovsk.

Russian-installed officials in Crimea declared a state of emergency due "primarily to resolve issues of an economic nature."

=== 27 June ===
Four FP-5 Flamingos were fired at the "Titan-Barrikady" plant in Volgograd, at least three struck. The plant builds components for Iskander-M and Yars missiles. Ukrainian drones struck the Vtorovo oil pumping station for the second time this month.

A Ukrainian MiG-29 crashed during a combat mission, with the pilot ejecting safely.

Ukraine and Russia both traded 160 POWs in a prisoner exchange.

=== 28 June ===
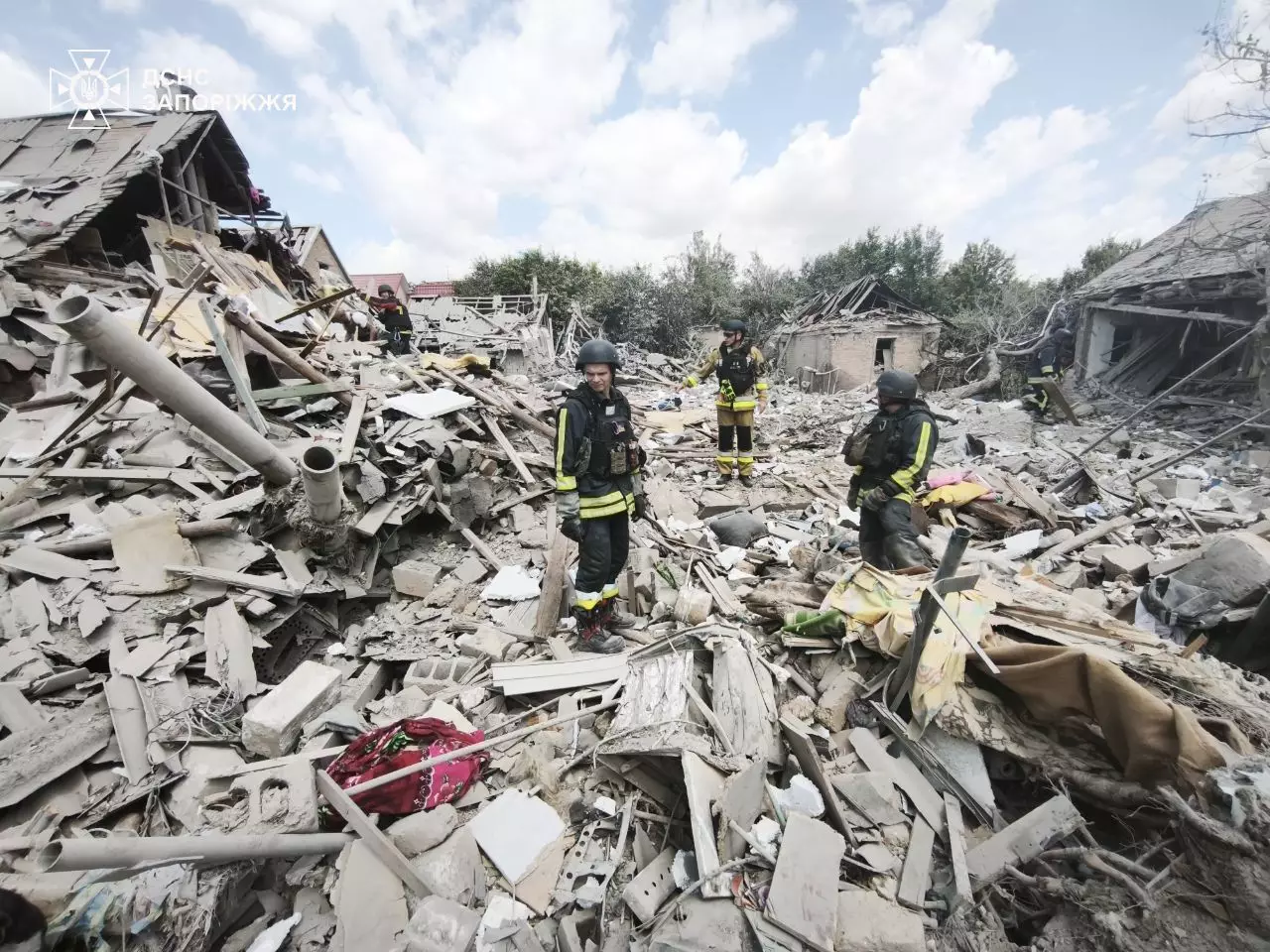
Houses in Zaporizhzhia after bombing on 28 June

Two people were injured by Russian attacks in Dnipropetrovsk Oblast. One person was injured in an attack on a building in Kharkiv Oblast.

=== 30 June ===
Russia claimed that it intercepted 419 Ukrainian drones. Ukrainian drones struck the Dubna space communications center for a second time.

Ukraine and Sweden signed a contract to order 16 Gripen E fighters for the Ukrainian Air Force.

Russian S-3/400 air defences intercepted a "long-range operational-tactical missile" over Moscow Oblast, resulting in a large crater. OSINT researchers believed it to be a Ukrainian ballistic missile.

== July 2026 ==
=== 1 July ===
A missile alert was sounded for Penza, Ukrainian drones set ablaze the State Bearing Plant, which makes components for military missiles and aviation. The Penza Research Institute of Electronic-Mechanical Instruments and Research Institute of Physical Measurements were also reportedly attacked. An oil refinery in Ufa was attacked by Ukrainian drones. The SBU claimed that Ukrainian drones struck five hangars at Saky airbase. Information suggested that a Su-30 and Su-30SM were inside two of the five hangers. Ukrainian drones set fire to an electrical substation in Feodosia, cutting power to parts of the city.

A bridge along the Mariupol–Donetsk highway between Kremenivka and Hranitne was destroyed by Ukraine. Ukrainian drones attacked Kurgan, smoke was reportedly ported over Kurganmashzavod by the Telegram channel ASTRA.

Ukraine allowed the export of domestically made weapons for the first time since 2022.

=== 2 July ===
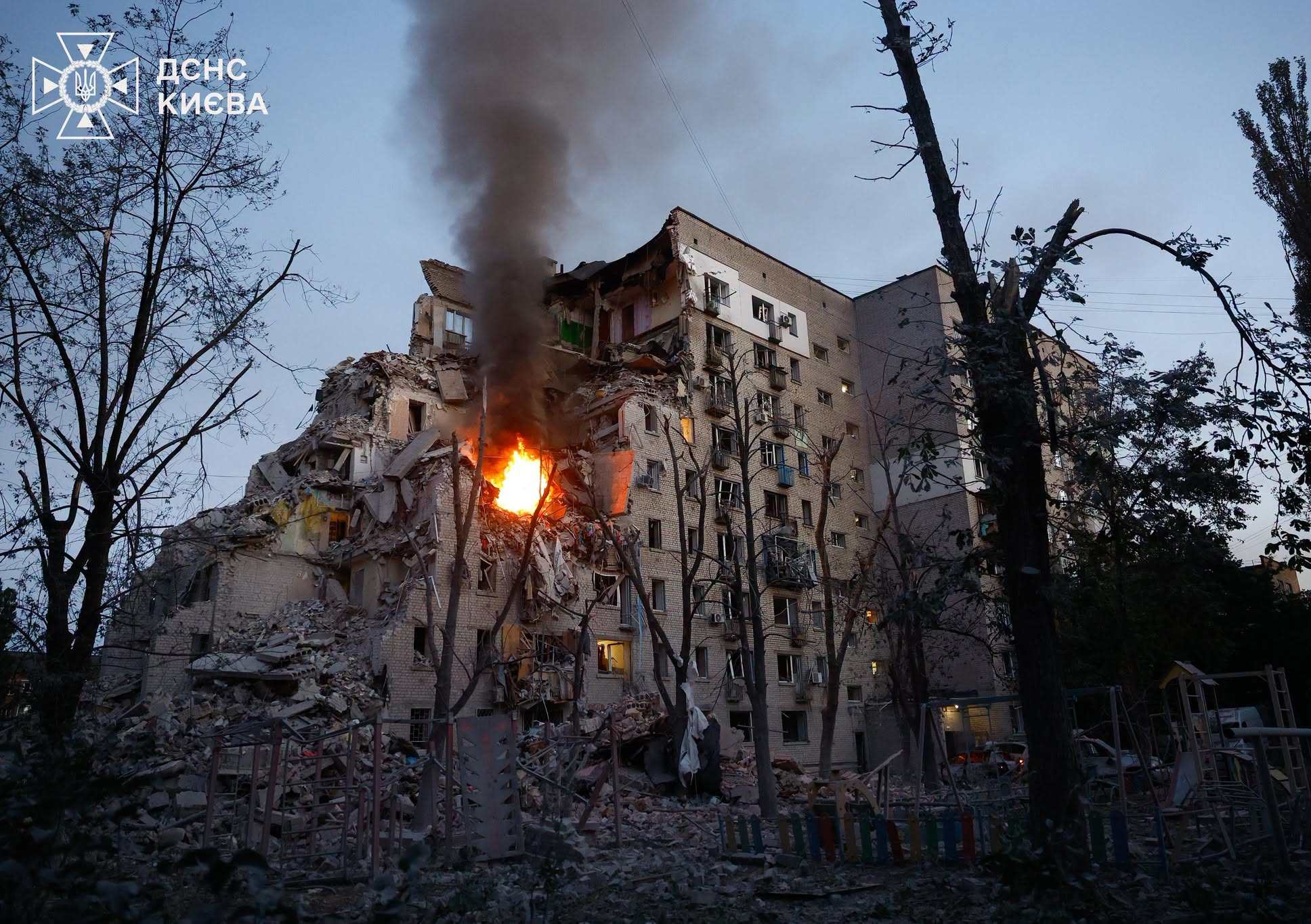
Apartment building in Kyiv after the attack

An overnight Russian air attack on Kyiv damaged more than 30 sites, killing at least 31 people and injuring 102 others. Attacks were also carried out in Poltava and Dnipropetrovsk oblasts.

Ukrainian drones attacked the Lukoil-Nizhegorodnefteorgsintez oil refinery in Kstovo, the AVT-6 was struck. A railway bridge, over the Siverskyi Donets River, near Stanytsia Luhanska, was also hit.

Germany's Federal Prosecutor charged Ukrainian national Serhii Kuznetsov in connection with the Nord Stream pipelines sabotage.

A Ka-52 was destroyed while on a combat mission in Ukraine, killing the pilot.

Ukrainian forces struck "12 electrical substations and one gas distribution" in occupied Ukraine over the last 48 hours, interrupting power in Crimea and Luhansk and Donetsk oblasts.

=== 3 July ===
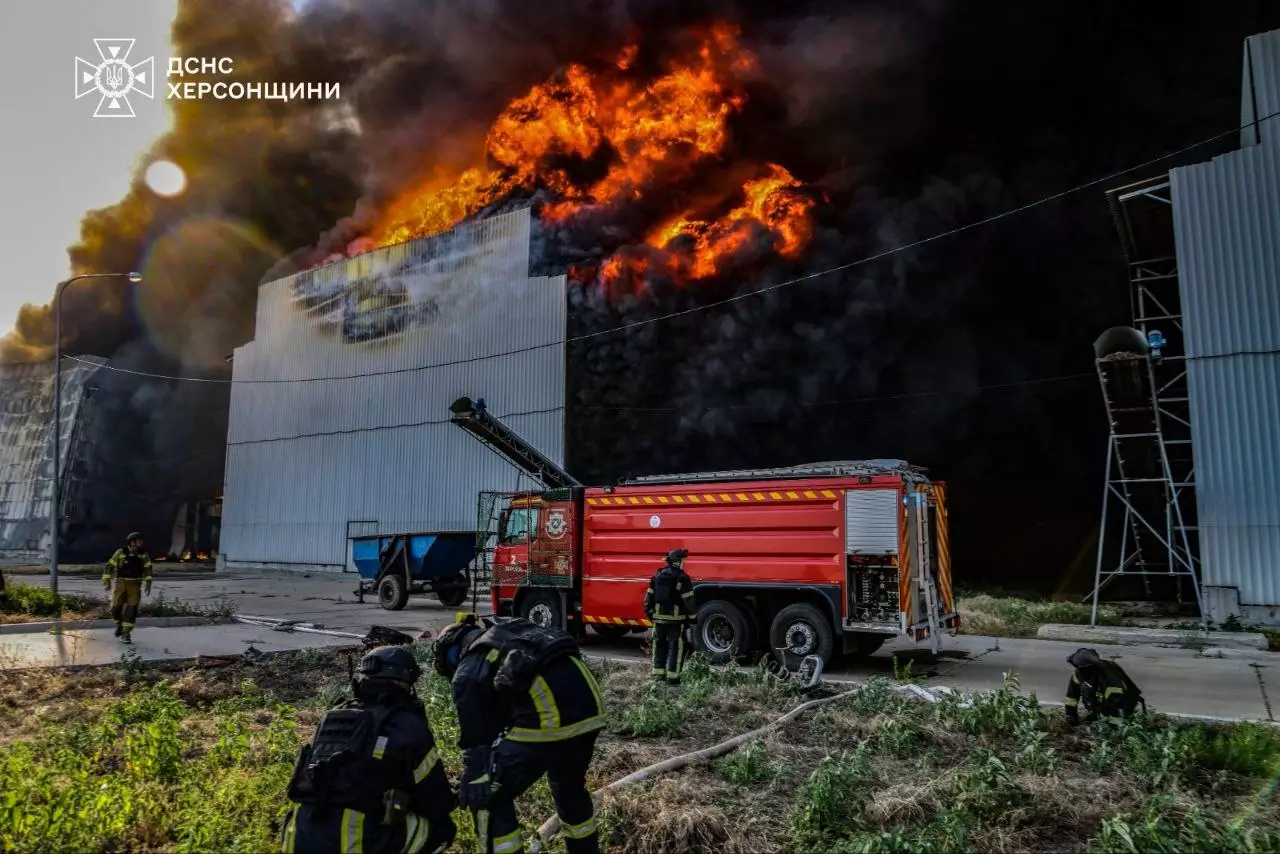
Poultry farm in Kherson Oblast after bombing on 3 July

A missile alert was declared for Belgorod. An electrical substation for the Michurinskaya Combined Heat and Power was destroyed, affecting traffic lights in Belgorod, domestic power supply and water supplies. The SBU claimed that seven jets were destroyed or damaged by drones during an attack on Saky airbase, including Su-30SMs, Su-30s and Su-24s.

At least three people were killed in a Russian airstrike on Sumy.

Russia claimed its forces took Kostiantynivka, adding that Russians now control the entire Luhansk Oblast. Ukraine denied the claim.

Vladimir Kovalchuk, head of Rylsky District in Kursk Oblast, and three district heads of various departments were injured in a car bombing.

=== 4 July ===
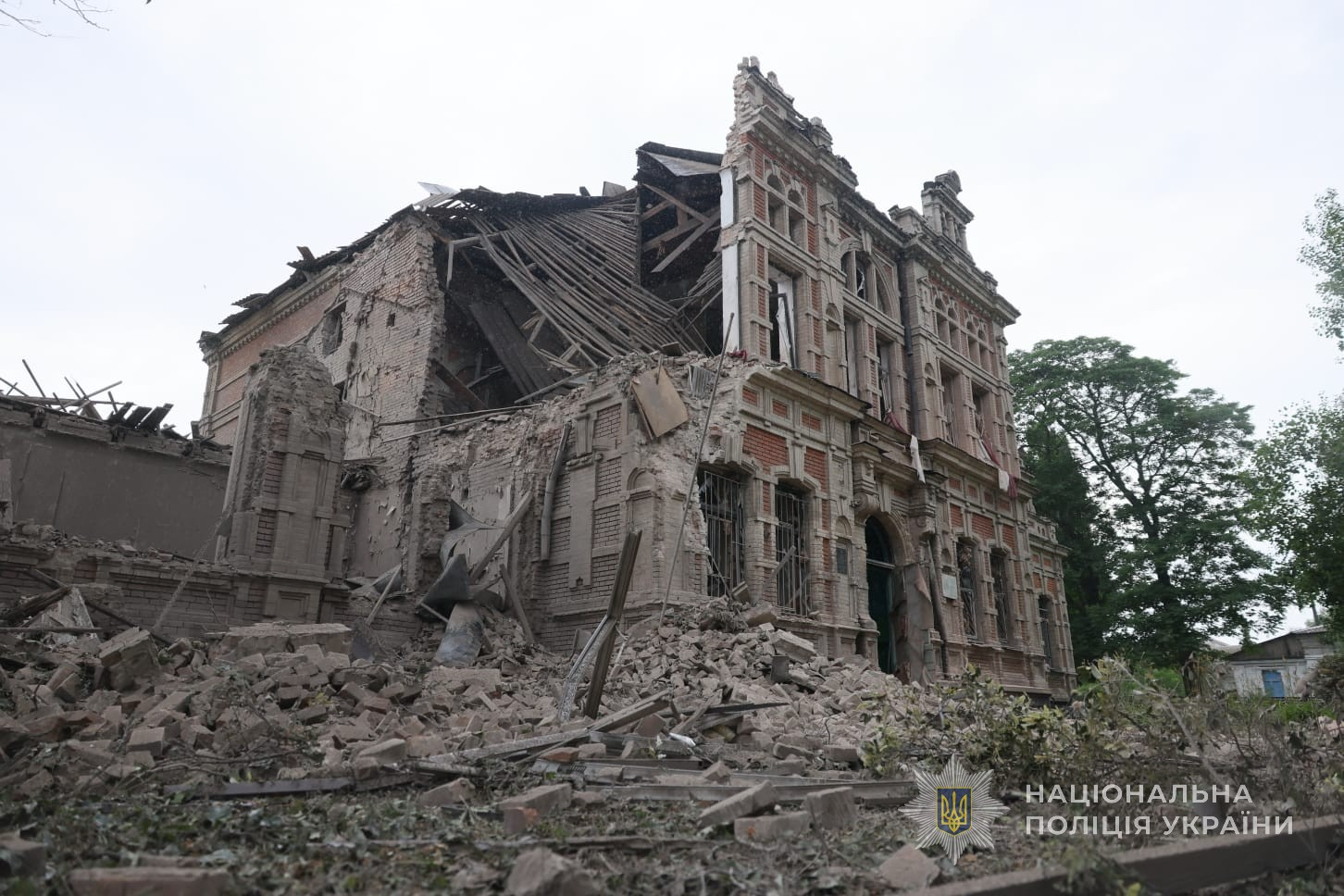
Historical building of a Mennonite school in Zaporizhzhia built in 1904 after bombing on 4 July

Ukrainian missiles struck the Luch thermal power plant and electrical substations in Belgorod, resulting in a "total blackout" for most of Belgorod and nearby settlements, water supplies were also interrupted. The ferry terminal near the Kerch Strait was attacked resulting in fires, fires were reported near Kerch and an airbase near Dzhankoi was attacked. The St. Petersburg Oil Terminal was attacked by "Ukrainian long-range drones" with local Telegram channels reporting explosions and smoke over the port area. Russian defences claimed to have downed "dozens of drones". Ukrainian forces struck a Russian helicopter over the Sea of Azov. The Kronstadt naval base was also attacked. Locals recorded footage over FP-5 Flamingos flying over Chuvashia.

=== 5 July ===
Ukrainian drones attacked two electrical substations, the “220 kV Bakhchisarai substation” was set on fire as was the “10/35/10 kV Zymyne substation”.

=== 6 July ===
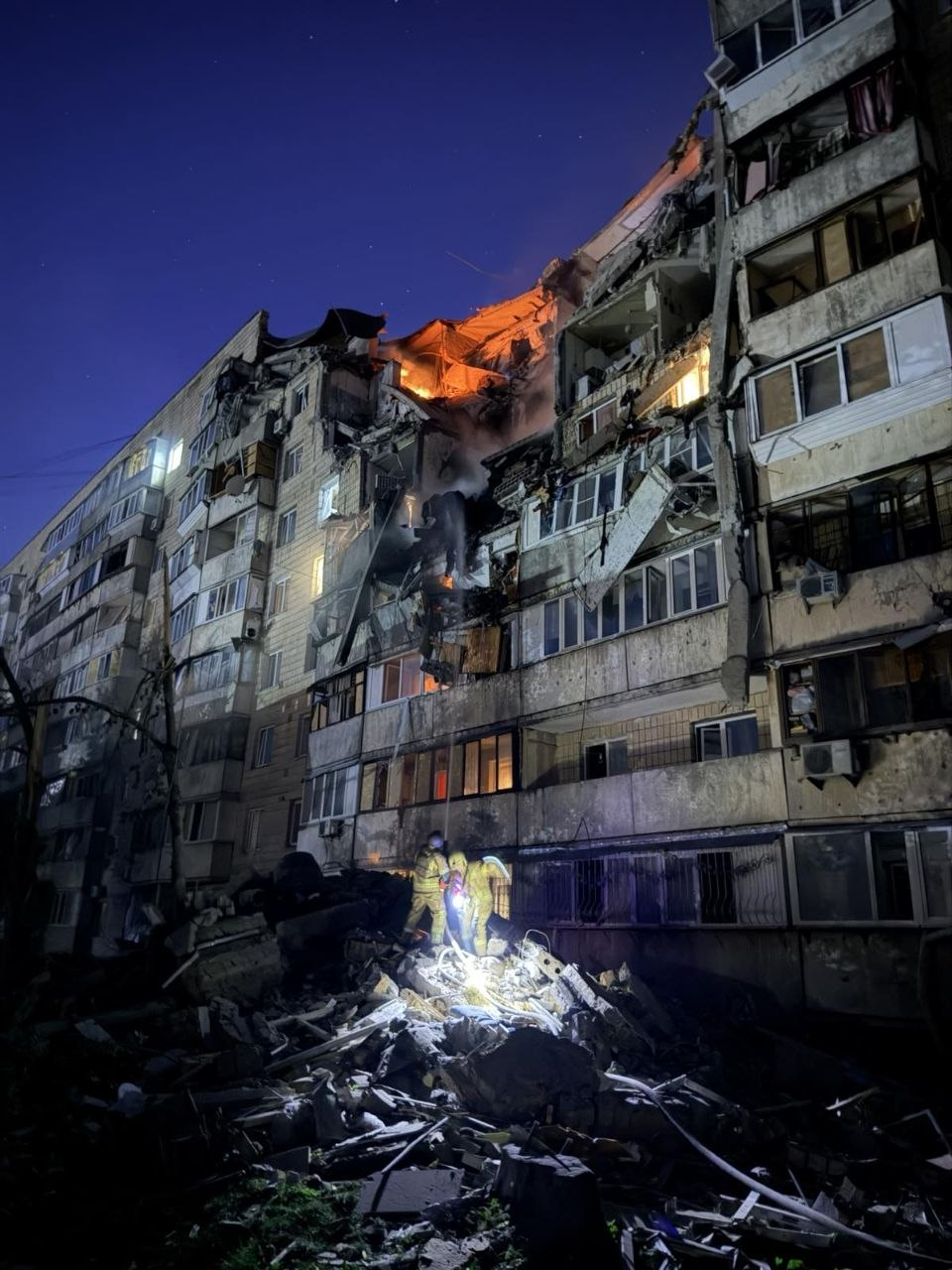
Apartment building in Kyiv after the attack

At least 19 people were killed in Kyiv and at least nine in Kyiv Oblast in a Russian ballistic missile attack. The Ukrainian Air Force said it was unable to shoot down any ballistic missiles due to a shortage of Patriot missiles. In Crimea, the Russian-installed governor claimed that a Ukrainian attack in the vicinity of Sevastopol had temporarily cut power supplies. The mayor of Moscow claimed that several waves of drones bound for the city were intercepted by Russian air defences. An S-400 battery in Bryansk Oblast was destroyed by Ukrainian drones.

Ukrainian drones struck the Omsk oil refinery. The “ELOU-AVT-11 primary oil refining unit” was damaged, with smoke being seen over the facility. The Yaroslavl oil pumping and dispatch station and oil refinery were attacked by SBU drones. At least one Su-57 and a A-50U were deployed to intercept drones. The Vysotsk oil port was also attacked with three storage tanks and two oil loading piers being damaged.

Four Ukrainian crew of an Mi-8 were killed intercepting drones over Poltava Oblast.

=== 7 July ===
A “massive missile attack” struck Belgorod, a natural gas pipeline was set on fire. Belgorod Airport was also attacked resulting in a fire. According to Belgorod Oblast governor Alexander Shuvaev, power and water supplies were also interrupted. The attack killed one person and injured three.

The USF claimed to have struck eight fuel tankers that were transporting fuel to Crimea through the Sea of Azov. Two railway bridges in Crimea were attacked, the Kremniy EL Group electronics plant in Bryansk and the Bryansk Chemical Plant were also attacked.

=== 8 July ===
The Saratov oil refinery was set on fire by Ukrainian drones. A petrochemical plant in Nizhnekamsk was attacked by drones as well. An oil depot in Tver was also reported to be on fire. The USF struck nine Russian fuel tankers on the Sea of Azov, using FP-2 drones. The USF also struck the “Kuban–Crimea energy bridge”, which allowed Russia to supply Crimea with power via submerged cables.

Borisoglebsk air base was attacked by Ukrainian drones, resulting in a fire. Liutyi drones struck Ufa, setting fire to an oil refinery with “thick black smoke” being seen over the oil refining cluster.

A Russian Su-35 was shot down by Ukrainian forces over the “eastern direction”.

A 30-year-old man in Lviv was taken into custody by mobilisation officers after being wanted since 12 June for mobilization, resulting in a riot by locals that left two servicemen injured and their car overturned.

=== 9 July ===
A Lukoil owned oil depot near Mikhaylovsk, Stavropol Krai was attacked by Ukrainian drones. Footage showed “fire and black smoke” coming from the facility. An oil depot in Tver was reportedly on fire. Ukrainian drones attacked two fuel tankers in Taganrog Bay, setting fire to both vessels.

=== 10 July ===
Ukraine carried out attacks on the Ilsky refinery in Severskaya, port infrastructure in Taganrog, a refinery in Azov, the Azov Optical-Mechanical Plant and the Kapotnya refinery in Moscow. In Moscow a missile alert was declared, one storage tank caught fire, another fire was reported in a refinery and the airports were closed. The USF destroyed 18 vessels near Crimea, including “13 tankers, three dry cargo ships, one ferry, and one support vessel”.

President Zelenskyy created a new branch of the Armed Forces of Ukraine, called the Joint Rapid Response Forces headed by Brigadier General Dmytro Serhiiovych Voloshyn. The task is “combine the capabilities...for rapid response on the front line”. The Long-Range Impact Command was also created, to be focused on “reducing Russia’s war potential” through long range attacks.

=== 11 July ===
Russia suspended civilian shipping through the Don–Azov Shipping Canal and the Kerch Strait. The USF struck 21 tankers, four tugboats, two dry cargo vessels, and a dredger on the Sea of Azov.

Six people were killed in Russian airstrikes on Sumy and Odesa.

=== 12 July ===
Syzran Oil Refinery was targeted by Ukrainian drones, setting the facility ablaze. The USF targeted 14 vessels, some ten tankers and four ferries, in the Sea of Azov. Some 90 vessels of various types were attacked between 6–12 July.

=== 13 July ===
Ukrainian drones set the Mikhailovsk oil depot on fire. The USF damaged 15 Russian vessels in the Sea of Azov: seven tankers, five dry cargo ships, two tugboats and one ferry. Ukrainian Air Force and drone units destroyed a Russian logistics hub near Armiansk.

A Russian Geran-2 drone crashed in Căușeni, Moldova.

The GRU Volunteer Corps was banned by the UK.

Nine European countries announced the formation of an anti-ballistic missile coalition with Ukraine to develop the defensive Freyja anti-ballistic missile system.

France and Ukraine signed an agreement that would allow it to manufacture French weapons under licence, such as the SCALP cruise missile, Aster air defence missiles and AASM Hammer bombs.

=== 14 July ===
Ukrainian drones attacked the Gazprom Neftekhim Salavat facility, with various fires being reported across the facility including at the AVT-6 processing unit. The Afipsky refinery was also attacked with a fire near the facility. Port infrastructure at Gelendzhik was also attacked. Five tankers and dry cargo ships as well as a harbor tug were attacked on the Sea of Azov. The Balaklava Thermal Power Plant in Sevastopol sustained "significant damage" during a Ukrainian strike, resulting in part of the city losing power.

The Ukrainian Navy struck the Izumrud, which was involved in the Kerch Strait incident, with a Sargan-3000, killing and injuring an unspecified number of crew members.

Ukraine successfully tested a ballistic missile, without specifying which model.

=== 15 July ===
The USF struck 20 Russian vessels, a tugboat, two gas carriers and 17 oil tankers in the Black Sea. An Mi-28 was shot down by a Ukrainian drone over Vyazovoye. The same day, a Russian drone struck a Marshall Islands-flagged civilian cargo ship, causing a fire and killing two people.

Zelenskyy dismissed defence minister Mykhailo Fedorov and offered the position to interior minister Ihor Klymenko.

=== 16 July ===
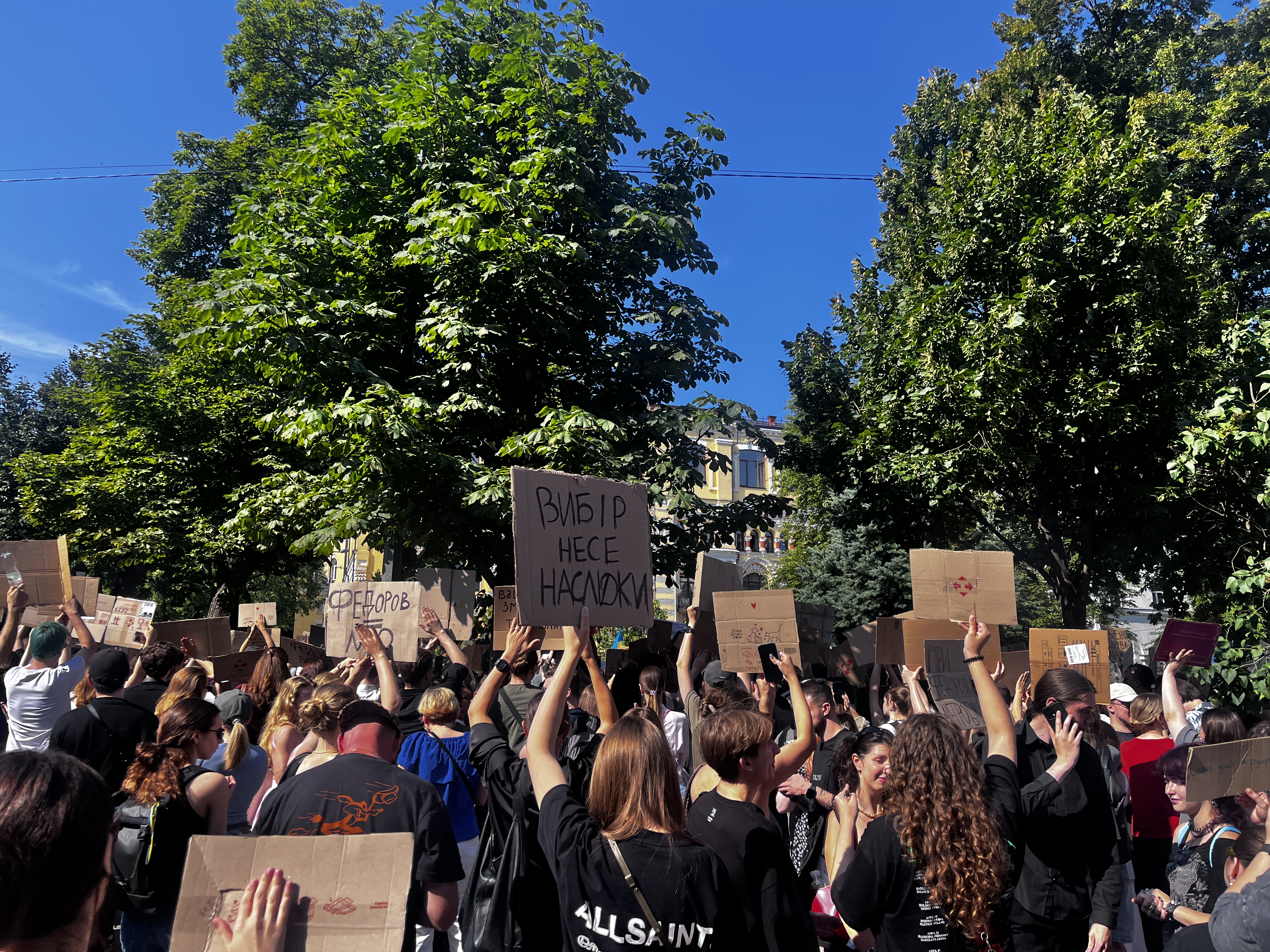
Ukrainians protest the dismissal of Mykhailo Fedorov in Kyiv, 16 July

The Engels-2 air base was attacked by newer Ukrainian “Shahed-like UAVs”, resulting in explosions and a fire.

Protests were held in Kyiv and other Ukrainian cities over the dismissal of Mykhailo Fedorov as defence minister and demanding the removal of Oleksandr Syrskyi as Commander-in-Chief of the Armed Forces of Ukraine.

The Ukrainian Navy and SBU naval drones sunk two tankers, the Louise 1 and Banda. A total of six tankers and two tug boats were sunk in the Black Sea and the Sea of Azov.

=== 17 July ===
An SBU drone strike on Engels-2 air base destroyed a Tu-95. Ukrainian drones struck the Yaroslavl refinery, oil and electrical infrastructure in Kerch was attacked as was bridges in Kursk and Donetsk Oblasts. Twelve Russian vessels were struck by Ukrainian drones in the Black Sea, including one tugboat, one gas carrier, one oil tanker and nine dry cargo ships.

=== 18 July ===
Ukrainian drones set Wildberries warehouses on fire in Elektrostal and Tambov, killing eight people and injuring 37 others. Moscow Mayor Sergey Sobyanin claimed that 370 Ukrainian drones were launched at Moscow Oblast, some 64 were intercepted while on approach to Moscow itself. An oil depot in Noginsk caught fire after a drone attack.

=== 19 July ===
A Russian ballistic missile attack on Kyiv killed at least one person and wounded 16 others.

Ukrainian drones struck 13 electrical nodes in Crimea and four vessels in the Black Sea, including two tankers, a bulk carrier, and a floating crane.

Three oil depots in Mikhailovsk were attacked by Ukrainian drones, resulting in fires and explosions.

=== 20 July ===
A Russian strike on a Guinea-Bissau-flagged cargo ship near Odesa killed at least 10 people; eight crew members were rescued.

Ukrainian drones struck seven ships in the Black Sea and Sea of Azov, including three tankers and four dry cargo ships. Andrey Vorobyov, Moscow Oblast Governor, claimed that Ukraine fired 400 drones at the region, wounding 10 and setting an oil depot and logistical facilities ablaze.

Due to rolling power cuts caused by Ukrainian drone strikes, Crimean authorities installed free landline phones.

Ukraine's SSU conducted a drone strike against a Russian FSB "coordination center" in Kherson Oblast, with 13 drones striking. Reportedly, there were 100 Russian personnel and 70 vehicles at the center, and that the strikes resulted in a "massive fire".

=== 21 July ===
The tanker “Gas Lisbon” was struck by a naval drone some 20 nautical miles from the Romanian coast on its way from Alexandria to Reni.

Zelenskyy dismissed Oleksandr Syrskyi as Commander-in-Chief of the Armed Forces of Ukraine and replaced him with Commander of the Joint Forces of the Armed Forces of Ukraine Major General Mykhailo Drapatyi.

=== 22 July ===
Ukrainian drones set fire to Wildberries facilities in Krasnodar and Stavropol Krais. Electrical substations in Masandra and Yalta were also struck by Ukrainian drones.

=== 23 July ===
Ukrainian drones set the NS-Oil Refinery, in Novospasskoye, Ulyanovsk Oblast, on fire. An oil pumping station in Tuymazy was damaged by Ukrainian drones. Drones also struck the Wildberries warehouse in Voronezh, setting it on fire. Alexander Logvinov, the head of the Communist Party's Belgorod city branch, was killed by a Ukrainian drone attack.

An Su-57 crashed in the Odintsovsky District of Moscow Oblast during a training mission. Although claimed to be an accident, friendly fire from anti-drone air defences was also been suggested as causing the crash.

Between 19-23 July, some 19 out of 71 petrol stations in Belgorod were damaged by Ukrainian drone strikes, damaging 26.7% of the area’s fuel infrastructure.

=== 24 July ===
Two Wildberries facilities, one in St. Petersburg and another near the village of Novosaratovka in Leningrad Oblast, were set on fire by Ukrainian drones. Flamingo missiles attacked the Avitek plant in Kirov, with at least one missile striking the plant. Fire Point confirmed the strike on the plant, which makes various missiles components and is Russia's only "serial producer of ejection seats for its fighter and attack aircraft. Six people were killed and "dozens more" injured.

A Russian ballistic missile attack on a military training ground in Kyiv, where an arms expo was occurring, killed at least 10 people and injured some 100 more.

Romania downed a drone that had crossed its airspace.

=== 25 July ===
Ukrainian drones struck warehouses in Belgorod, injuring one person. Other drones struck the Luch thermal power plant, an electrical substation, civilian buildings, residential and commercial buildings, and a gas pipe. An air attack on Rostov-on-Don was reported by regional governor Yury Slyusar, injuring five people. Drones also struck a Wildberries warehouse in Yekaterinburg, causing fires amongst cars in the parking lot. Engels was attacked with a missile. A barracks in the city caught fire, although the cause was unclear. Explosions were reported in Luhansk.

The Tyumen Oil Refinery was attacked by Ukrainian drones.

Romania intercepted a drone that had violated its airspace above a sparsely populated area in the vicinity of the Ukrainian border.

The Russian-installed governor of Zaporizhzhia Oblast claimed that eight people were killed in a Ukrainian attack on Kyrylivka.

Ukraine struck a Russian warship and ships used to transfer Iranian-linked military supplies in the Caspian Sea, killing a sailor and injuring another.

The Filanovsky oil platform was attacked by Ukrainian drones.

A Roskomnadzor official, Mikhail Ivanov, based in the town of Kyrylivka was killed by a Ukrainian strike. Responsible for internet and radio censorship, Ivanov had served with the Russian Armed Forces for over 20 years.

=== 26 July ===
Romanian Air Force F-16s shot down a third Russian drone that violated Romanian airspace, the third one in as many days.

The Guinea-Bissau flagged cargo vessel MV Golden Leo sank off the coast of Odesa a week after being attacked by Russian drones, killing 10 people on board, including four Indian nationals.

=== 27 July ===
Ukrainian drones attacked a “port facility” in Rostov-on-Don, killing two and injuring five. An attack on Taganrog was reported. Ukrainian drones attacked an air defence system in central Belgorod. A series of explosions and a fire broke out; water supplies were interrupted in several parts of the city.

Oleg Shutov was killed by an explosion in occupied Donetsk. He was accused of killing HUR Colonel Maksym Shapoval in 2017.

=== 28 July ===
Ukrainian forces lost 2 square miles of Russia's territory.

Ukrainian drones attacked the Hydrostalkonstruktsiya steel fabrication factory in Chekhov, Moscow Oblast, the Chekhov Regeneration Plant, which produces and recycles rubber products, and a warehouse serving several vendors in Koledino. Moscow Oblast Governor Andrey Vorobyov claimed residential buildings were hit in both areas by drones or falling debris. An electrical substation in Feodosia was hit, leading to a blackout in the city.

=== 29 July ===
Ukrainian drones struck targets in Ryazan, Rostov and Perm Oblasts. An oil refinery in Perm was set ablaze. Drones struck the oil refinery and a Wildberries logistics center in Ryazan. In Taganrog, falling “missile debris” struck a residential building, killing a woman and injuring a man.

Andrey Cherezov, head of a UAV company called Russian Laboratory of Air Transport, was shot three times outside his home in Tula, leaving him hospitalised in a serious condition.

A Ukrainian F-16 crashed while on a combat mission, forcing the pilot to eject to safety. The cause of crash was “an in-flight emergency”, which is being investigated.

The FSB charged Telegram founder Pavel Durov with assisting Ukraine's "terrorism".

=== 30 July ===
Ukrainian Liutyi drones struck the Wildberries warehouse in Sarapul, setting it ablaze. The Tamanneftegaz oil and gas terminal in Taman was attacked by Ukrainian drones starting a fire. The Penza Wildberries storage facility was set on fire.

A Russian cruise missile flew some 100 km (62 mi) into Poland before crashing in Lublin County. Whether it was shot down or crashed due to technical reasons is unknown.

=== 31 July ===
A Wildberries warehouse and oil refinery in Volgograd were attacked by drones. Volgograd Oblast Governor Andrey Bocharov confirmed that fires occurred at an industrial facility and warehouse premises, injuring five people. A fire occurred at an oil refinery in Tuapse, although the cause is unknown. Smoke was reported over the Zelenodolsk Wildberries facility and the Nizhnekamsk oil refinery was attacked. A synthetic rubber plant, also in Nizhnekamsk, was also set on fire by drones.

President Zelenskyy claimed in an interview that about 50,000 Ukrainian soldiers have been killed in action during the full scale war, 400,000 wounded and a "huge" number are missing in action. He also claimed that Russian losses were 1,600,000, with 700,000 deaths.

== August 2026 ==
=== 1 August ===
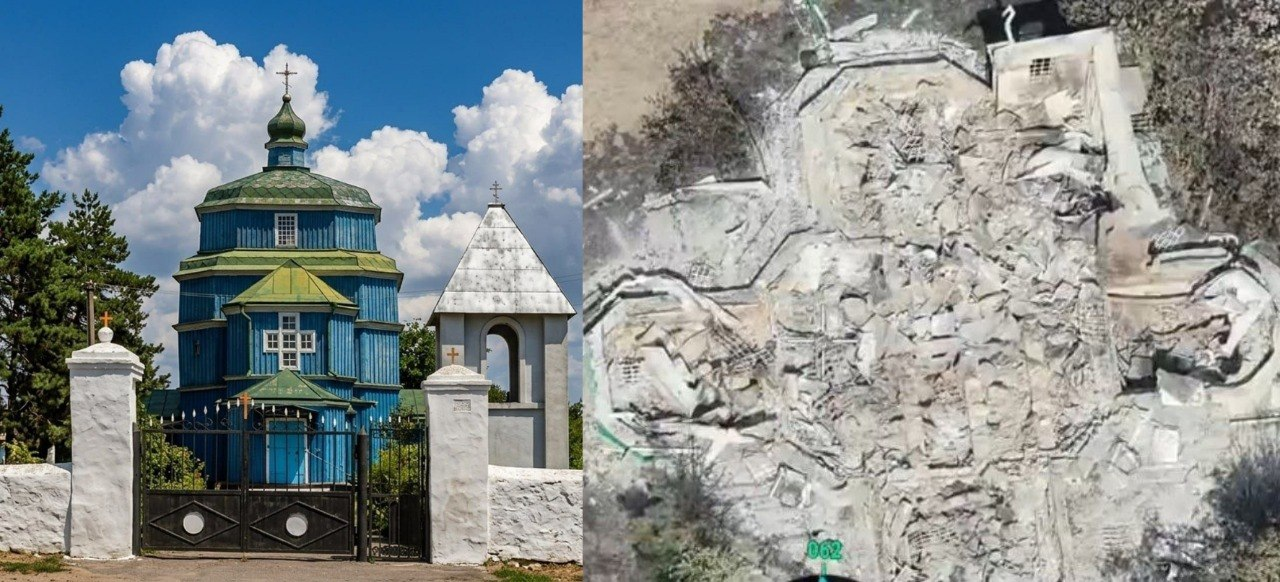
Holy Presentation Church (1726) in Beryslav, Kherson Oblast, after Russian drone strike on 1 August

Nine people were killed in a Russian missile attack on Kyiv.

The Russian container ship Yanina, owned by a company under Rosatom, sank after being struck by two naval drones 130 nautical miles from Novorossiysk. The Ufaneftekhim oil refinery in Ufa was attacked by Ukrainian drones resulting in a fire.

A bomb exploded outside a restaurant in Moscow, killing five and injuring 19. The target was believed to be Russian Aerospace Forces Commander-in-Chief Colonel-General Aleksandr Chayko, who was celebrating his 55th birthday. Chayko was protected by a bodyguard. but his daughter sustained a traumatic brain injury and his niece was wounded along with his father-in-law. The female bomber, a security guard, two of Chayko‘s relatives, and Major General Valery Plokhotnyuk died as a result of the bombing.

The Ukrainian General Staff claimed Russian forces suffered 42,860 casualties for the month of July. This figure included “killed, wounded, missing, and captured”, the highest figure for 2026.

=== 2 August ===
A Wildberries warehouse in Samara Oblast caught fire in Ukrainian drone strikes. Local officials claimed that nine people were killed in Ukrainian drone attacks in Russia.

Russian attacks in Dnipropetrovsk Oblast killed two people. One person was killed in a Russian guided bomb attack in Zaporizhzhia. Another person was killed in a Russian attack on Kharkiv's outskirts.

Romania scrambled two F-16s after a Russian drone flew into the country’s airspace. The drone flew back to Ukrainian airspace after some 20 minutes, where Ukrainian aircraft shot it down.

A man in Odesa opened fire at a military recruitment centre, injuring four people who worked for the Territorial Recruitment Center.

=== 3 August ===
President Zelenskyy appointed Rustem Umerov, his former defence minister, as the new head of the Foreign Intelligence Service of Ukraine.

Belgorod Technological University was attacked by Ukrainian drones, setting it on fire. The facility was used to develop UAV weapon controls. A freight terminal in Belgorod, belonging to the logistics company Delovie Linii, was destroyed. A Wildberries facility in Vladimir Oblast was attacked by Ukrainian drones, injuring two people. Seven people were killed in a drone strike on Arkhipo-Osipovka, Krasnodar Krai, while four others were killed in a separate attack in Crimea. Ukrainian drones struck the bridge of the Russian cargo ship Nadezhda, some 20 nautical miles from Novorossiysk injuring all 22 crew on board.

=== 4 August ===
Zelenskyy renewed the 40-day influence operation announced on 25 June led by the SBU to push Russia toward ending the war. UATV reported that the 40-day operation had to date disabled 30% of Russia's oil-refining capacity, 80% of Wildberries logistics centres had been damaged, strikes had been made on other high-value military and logistics targets and that U.S. secretary of state Marco Rubio had acknowledged this by saying "long-range strikes by Ukraine's armed forces have changed the dynamics of the war."

A Wildberries facility in Chekhov, Moscow Oblast was attacked, with “thick black smoke” rising from the building. The industrial area of Novosyolki was also attacked. The local governor said that five were killed and six injured. Smoke was also seen over a Wildberries facility in Krasny Bor, 30 kilometres (19 mi) from St. Petersburg. The Syzran Oil Refinery was also attacked with unknown weapons, resulting in a fire.

An explosives laden drone was found next to a Ukrainian Antonov Airlines An-124 that was at the Leipzig/Halle Airport being loaded with ammunition. According to the Wall Street Journal, US intelligence determined that the drone “likely belongs to Moscow”. The drone struck the aircraft but failed to detonate before bouncing off and landing on the ground.

=== 5 August ===
At least 17 people were killed in a Russian missile attack on Kyiv and surrounding areas.

A Wildberries warehouse in Aleksin was attacked by Ukrainian drones, resulting in a fire engulfing the facility.

A car belonging to the CEO of drone company Uraldronzavod, Volodymyr Tkachuk, was exploded near Yekaterinburg, leaving him in critical condition. Uraldronzavod manufactures FPV drones used by Russian forces in Ukraine.

A Turkish cargo vessel was set on fire in a drone strike in the vicinity of Novorossiysk, critically wounding three crew members.

=== 6 August ===
Oil refineries in Bashkortostan and Yaroslavl were attacked by Ukrainian drones, resulting in fires. Two Svetlyak-class patrol boats were damaged by Ukrainian drones near Kerch. Russia struck the civilian cargo ship Mera Queen in the Black Sea, killing a Ukrainian sailor and injuring three others.

=== 7 August ===
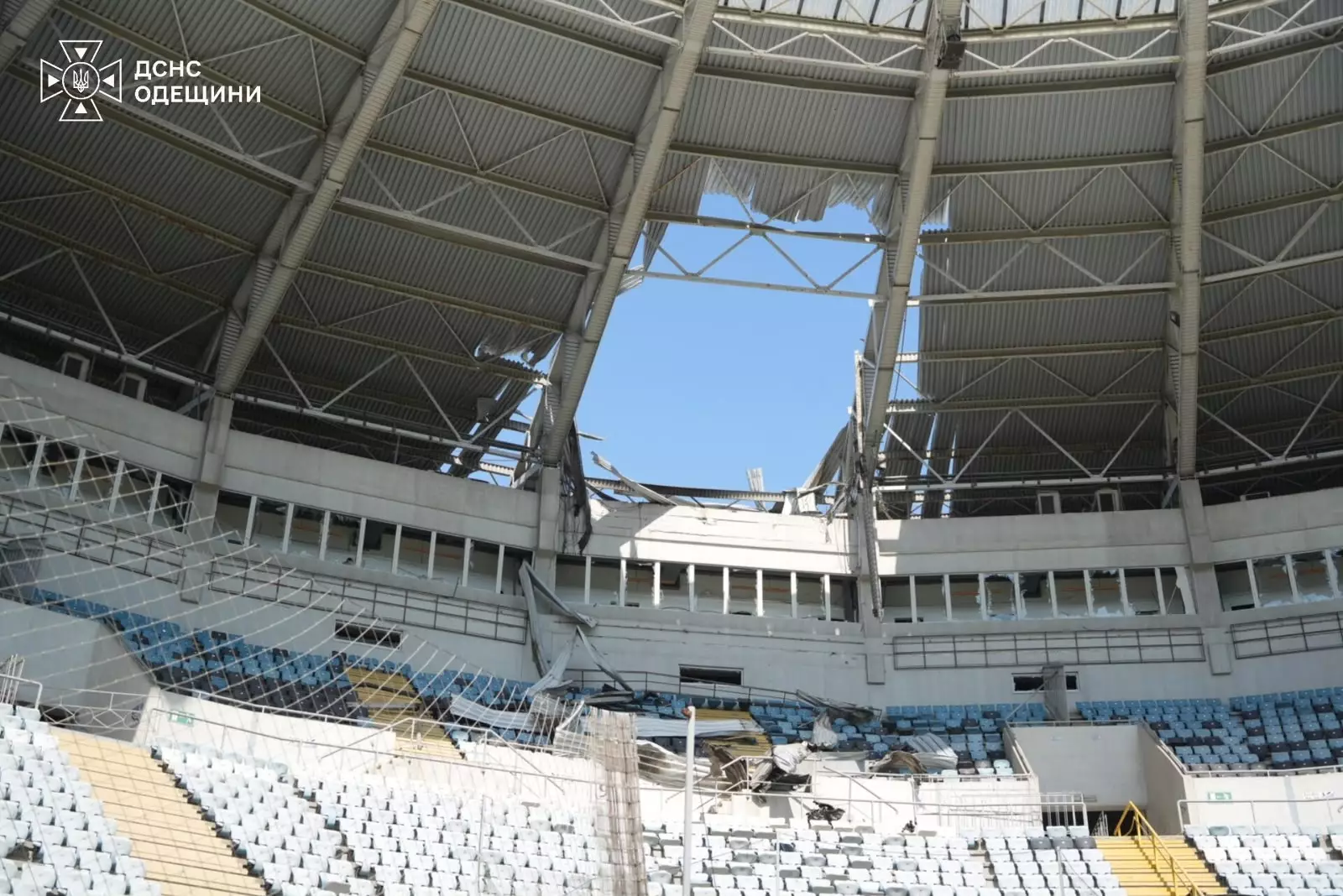
Chornomorets Stadium in Odesa after the attack on 7 August 2026

An attack by Russian forces damaged Chornomorets football stadium in Odesa and left one person injured.

Liutyi drones struck the Wildberries' logistics hub in Yekaterinburg, eight drones were claimed to have been shot down while three struck the facility.

The Russian Ministry of Defence reported the creation of the Ukrainian Volunteer Spetsnaz Brigade, composed of "defecting" Ukrainian soldiers.

=== 8 August ===
Three people were killed while three others were wounded in Russian attacks on Boryspil.

Ukrainian drones struck oil refineries in Syzran and Ilsky, resulting in fires. USF drones struck 12 Russian Shadow Fleet ships in the Black Sea and Sea of Azov leading up to 8 August.

A Ukrainian drone crashed near the Trans-Balkan pipeline in Bulgaria, Ukraine claimed it was not a combat drone.

=== 9 August ===
Historical apartment building in the center of Odesa after the attack

On the night of 8–9 August, Russian forces launched a large-scale attack on Odesa and Odesa Oblast using 11 missiles of several types and up to 100 drones. Strikes were recorded at nine locations, and the attack continued into the afternoon of 9 August.

Ukrainian drones struck multiple buildings near the regional FSB headquarters in Belgorod. Fires broke out at the Avtograd shopping center and residential buildings. Three people were killed and 25 others were injured.

A Russian drone crashed in Crocmaz, while fragments from a Russian “guided missile” or “missile-type drone” believed to have hit a tree were discovered in a nearby forest.

=== 10 August ===
Thirteen people were killed in a Ukrainian drone strike on Nizhnekamsk that hit the Tanevo oil refinery. ZapSibNeftekhim, a petrochemical company in Tobolsk, was attacked by Ukrainian drones resulting in a fire at the Central Gas Fractionation Unit. Eight Uzbek nationals and a Tajik national were among those killed in the attack.

A Russian drone overflew Moldova before returning to Ukrainian airspace, prompting the Moldovan Foreign Ministry to recall its ambassador to Russia.

A Ukrainian MiG-29 fighter jet crashed during a combat mission in Odesa Oblast. The pilot safely ejected.

=== 11 August ===
Six people were killed in a Russian missile attack on Zaporizhzhia. The Ukrainian military said North Korean KN-23 ballistic missiles were also used in the attack.

Ukrainian drones attacked the Orsknefteorgsintez oil refinery in Orsk. A Wildberries facility near Voronezh was set on fire by Ukrainian drones with the workers being evacuated.

Turkey sold to Ukraine 70 ATACMS, 12 M270 Multiple Launch Rocket Systems, 2,524 M26 rockets and 47,000 M509A1 203 mm cluster artillery shells.

=== 12 August ===
A drone attack was carried out on port infrastructure in Novorossiysk. Zelenskyy said that missile-drones, naval drones and Neptune missiles were used. A grain terminal, infrastructure for the Black Sea Fleet, the Sheskharis oil terminal and residential buildings were damaged or set on fire. Russian officials claimed one person was killed while eight others were injured.

President Putin declared that Russia will seize European vessels if European states carry out plans to seize commercial ships carrying Russian cargo, adding that the country will respond outside the waters where its ships are seized.

=== 13 August ===
In Bashkortostan, a Wildberries facility in Chishminsky District and the Gazprom Neftekhim Salavat oil refinery were attacked by drones, causing fires.

Robert Shagieiev, a 1st Captain in the Black Sea Fleet and one time commander of the Ukrainian submarine Zaporizhzhia, was believed to have been killed by bomb that exploded in a trash can as he walked by in Sevastopol. He was wanted for high treason by the SBU for accepting the Russian occupation of Crimea and joining the Russian Navy.

A Russian Shahed drone struck a passenger train in Odesa Oblast, killing the driver and assistant driver; the 340 passengers and other crew members were evacuated without injury.

=== 14 August ===
Ukrainian drones attacked port infrastructure in Ust-Luga, resulting in a fire. A Wildberries facility in Tver was also damaged by drones.

An unidentified drone entered Latvian airspace for a period of 40 minutes, forcing NATO jets to shoot it down. The drone was “affected by Russian electronic warfare”, according to the Latvian military.

=== 15 August ===
Ukrainian FP-5 Flamingo missiles struck the Progress Rocket Space Centre in Samara. The Progress factory builds the Soyuz-2.1b rockets used to launch Rassvet satellites. Rassvet is the Russian analogue of Starlink. The Savasleyka air base, which hosts MiG-31 fighters, was set on fire.

=== 16 August ===
Two Wildberries facilities in Moscow Oblast were attacked by Ukrainian drones. A facility in Domodedovo and another in Koledino, near Podolsk, were attacked by drones resulting in both buildings catching fire. Five people were killed in Ukrainian attacks in Rostov Oblast, while two others were killed in Belgorod and Moscow Oblasts respectively. In Rostov Oblast, Neptune missiles were fired at the Kamensky Combine, which manufactures solid rocket fuel in various MLRS systems and explosives. Two workshops were reported destroyed and four damaged, according to Ukrainian officials.

A Spanish F-18 fighter pilot in a NATO air policing mission downed a drone that violated Romania's airspace near the Ukrainian border.

=== 17 August ===
Eight people were killed in Ukrainian attacks on Belgorod Oblast, while a ninth died in Astrakhan Oblast. Four people were killed in Russian attacks on Donetsk and Sumy Oblasts.

=== 18 August ===
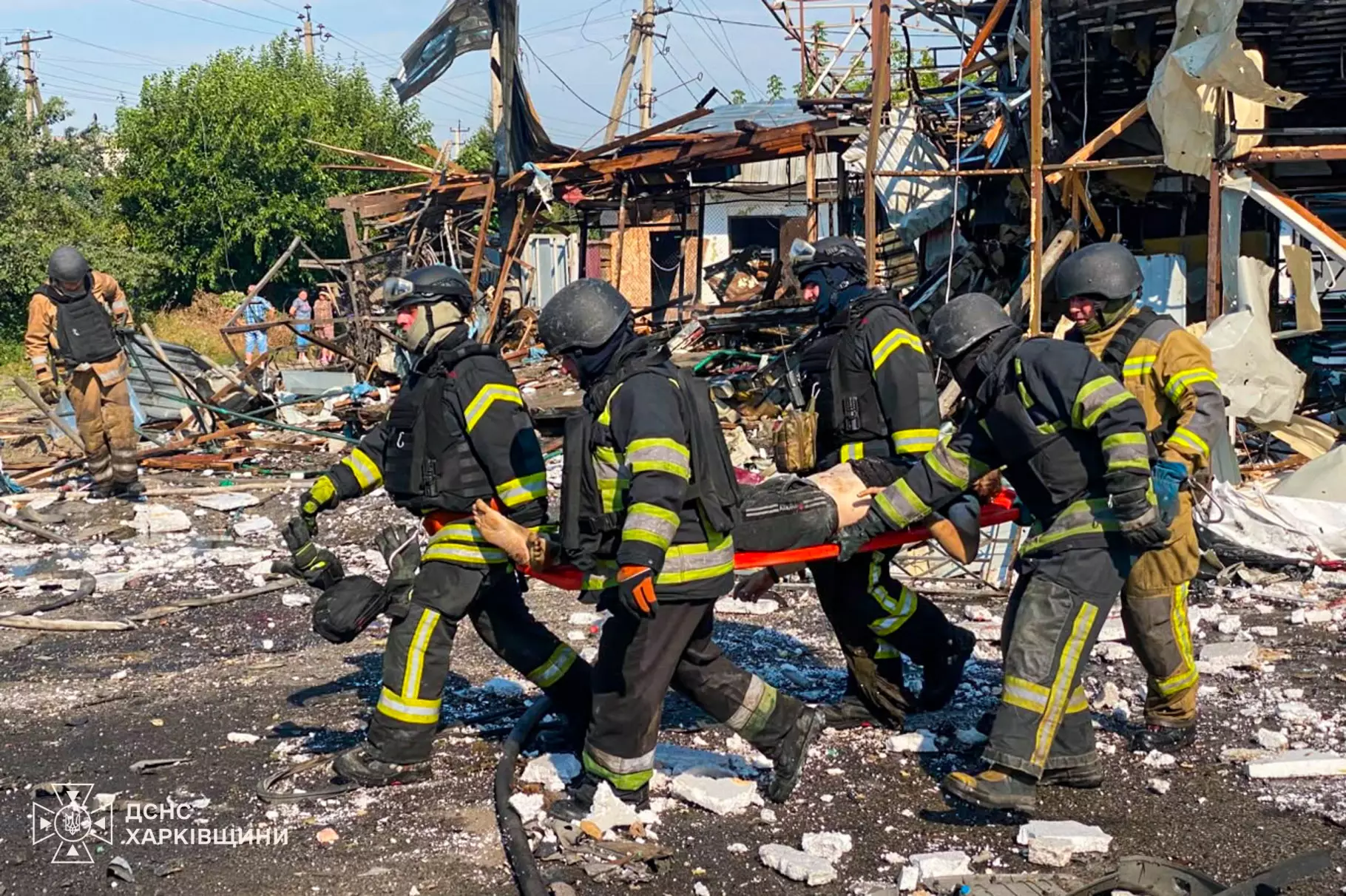
Destructions in Pechenihy after the attack

Ten people were killed in a Russian attack on Pechenihy, Kharkiv Oblast.

=== 19 August ===
Ukraine and Russia each exchanged 103 POWs.

Yevhenii Khmara was officially approved by the Verkhovna Rada as the new defence minister.

Ukrainian drones set fire to the Bashneft-Ufa Oil Refinery. Ukrainian drones struck a residential building in Dzerzhinsk; after being shot down, explosions were also reported in Novomoskovsk.

=== 20 August ===
At least 16 people were killed and roughly 40 others were injured in a Russian missile and drone attack in Kyiv Oblast.

Russia claimed that it downed 726 Ukrainian UAVs, including above Crimea, the Black Sea and the Sea of Azov. Ukrainian drones struck the Tamanneftegaz oil refinery and a gas facility in Volna, both in Krasnodar Krai, with NASA FIRMS reporting fires at both locations. A power substation in Taman was also attacked. FP-1 drones attacked the oil refinery in Nizhnekamsk.

In Romania, a drone crashed into an uninhabited area of Grindu, Tulcea. Two Spanish F-18s and a Romanian helicopter were scrambled during the alert. A suspected Russian naval drone on the Black Sea, 80 miles (130 km) east of Constanta, was destroyed by a Romanian F-16.

=== 21 August ===
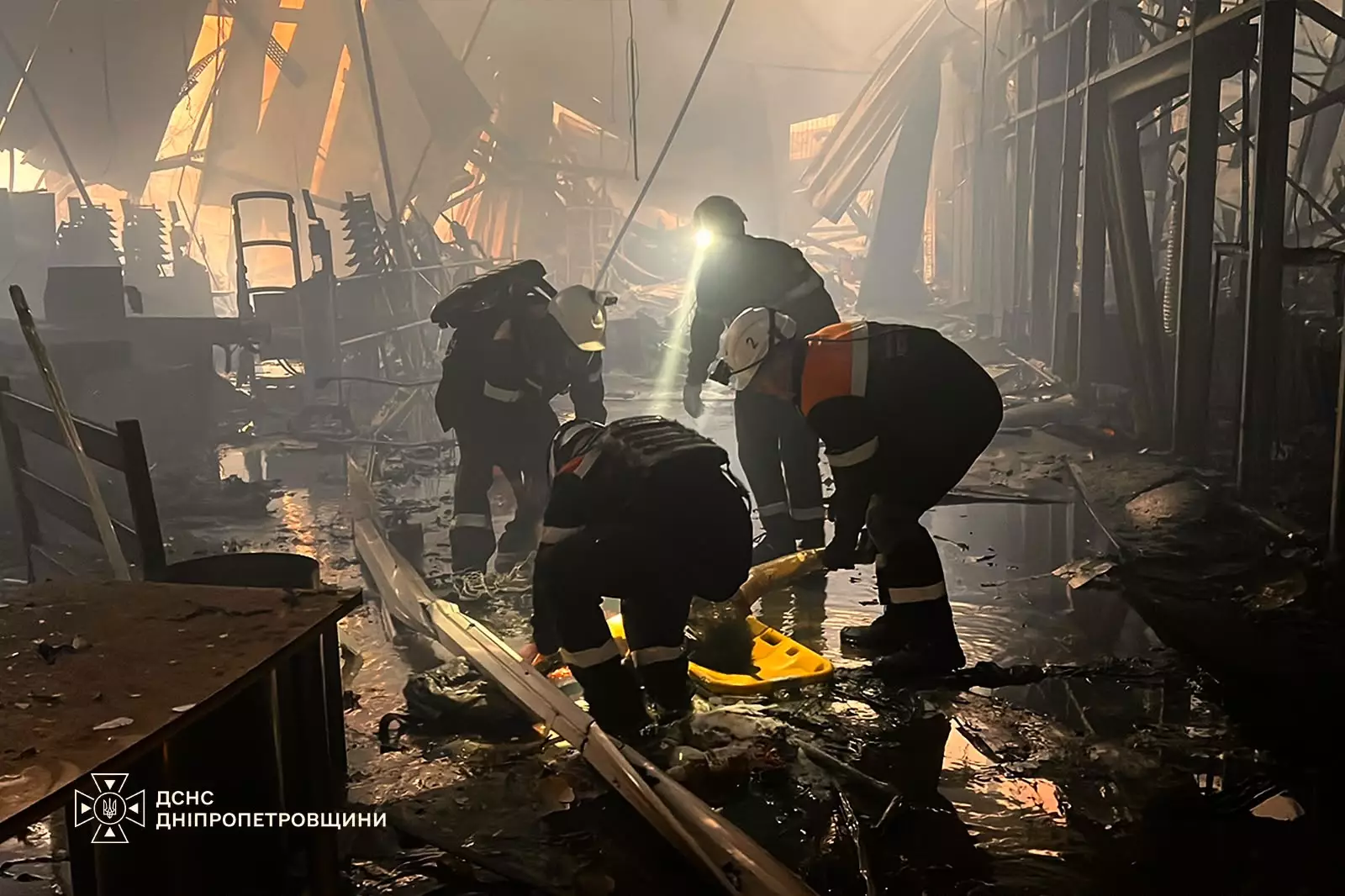
Ruins of the shopping mall in Kryvyi Rih

Sixteen people were killed in a Russian double-tap strike on a mall in Kryvyi Rih.

The Perm oil refinery was attacked by Ukrainian drones, with smoke being reported over the facility. A Ukrainian drone attack damaged a Su-34 fighter in Akhtubinsk.

Colonel Dmitry Shabaev, commander of the 64th Separate Guards Motor Rifle Brigade, was “seriously injured”, along with his driver, by a Ukrainian drone strike near Huliaipole. Shabaev and his unit are accused of being involved in the Bucha massacre.

A Ukrainian made jet interceptor, the Alexa Spatium, entered service. It is capable of intercepting all Russian propeller and jet-powered drones plus other aerial targets such as cruise missiles.

The Ukrainian 44th Separate Mechanized Brigade used a Droid TW-12.7 UGV to assault a Russian position. The brigade claimed that around 20 Russian soldiers were killed by the UGV though United24 stated that the casualty figure claimed by the brigade could not be independently verified.

=== 22 August ===
One person was killed in a Russian attack on Kyiv Oblast, while another person was killed in separate attack on Zaporizhzhia Oblast.

The governor of Krasnodar Krai claimed that two people were killed in a Ukrainian drone strike that hit a home in Yeysky District. One person was killed in a separate attack in Samara Oblast.

A 55-year-old enlistment officer was fatally stabbed in Lviv. The 25-year-old male suspect was shot by police in the leg.

Ukrainian drones set the Ozon warehouse in Samara Oblast ablaze, forcing the evacuation of some 500 employees with several reportedly being injured. The Novokuibyshevskyi oil refinery in Samara Oblast was also attacked. Ukrainian drones destroyed an Su-24M, four pieces of “airfield equipment” and drone control points at Saky airbase.

Several Russian S8000 Banderol cruise missiles crossed into Belarusian airspace; one traveled 75 miles (121 km) before running out of fuel and crashing in a field.

Ukrainian drones were spotted over the Plesetsk Cosmodrome for the first time.

Russian forces retook the city of Rodynske in Donetsk Oblast.

=== 23 August ===
Ukrainian drones struck the Ozon facility in Orenburg, causing a fire. Another industrial facility was also struck during the attack.

Ukrainian forces destroyed an Iskander-M launcher, somewhere in Russia, according to President Zelenskyy. Ukrainian drones also destroyed an Su-33 and a MiG-29 at Vityazevo airfield. Other strikes destroyed a S-400, Tor missile systems and various radars.

=== 24 August ===
The governor of Krasnodar Krai claimed that Ukrainian drones attacked the Kuchenland home furniture centre in Krasnodar, wounding 11 people including nine children and two adults. Ozon facilities in Adygea, Nevinnomyssk and Tyube were set ablaze. Ukrainian drones damaged a MiG-29 at Millerovo air base.

The EU released $7.1 billion in military aid for Ukraine.

Ten Ukrainian servicemen previously listed as missing were repatriated via Belarus.

British prime minister Andy Burnham declared that Ukraine will have access to classified technology to manufacture Storm Shadow cruise missiles, capable of striking deep within Russia.

=== 25 August ===
The Afipsky Oil Refinery was attacked by Ukrainian drones. The Novoshakhtinsk oil refinery was also attacked by Ukrainian drones. The extent of the damage to both facilities is unknown.

The Vynohradivka border crossing, between Moldova and Ukraine, was closed after a Russian drone strike.

The United States government asked Ukraine to suspend drone attacks on Moscow and St Petersburg for as long as CIA director John Ratcliffe is in the country. A US Air Force Boeing C-17A Globemaster III landed at Moscow airport with other diplomats.

=== 26 August ===
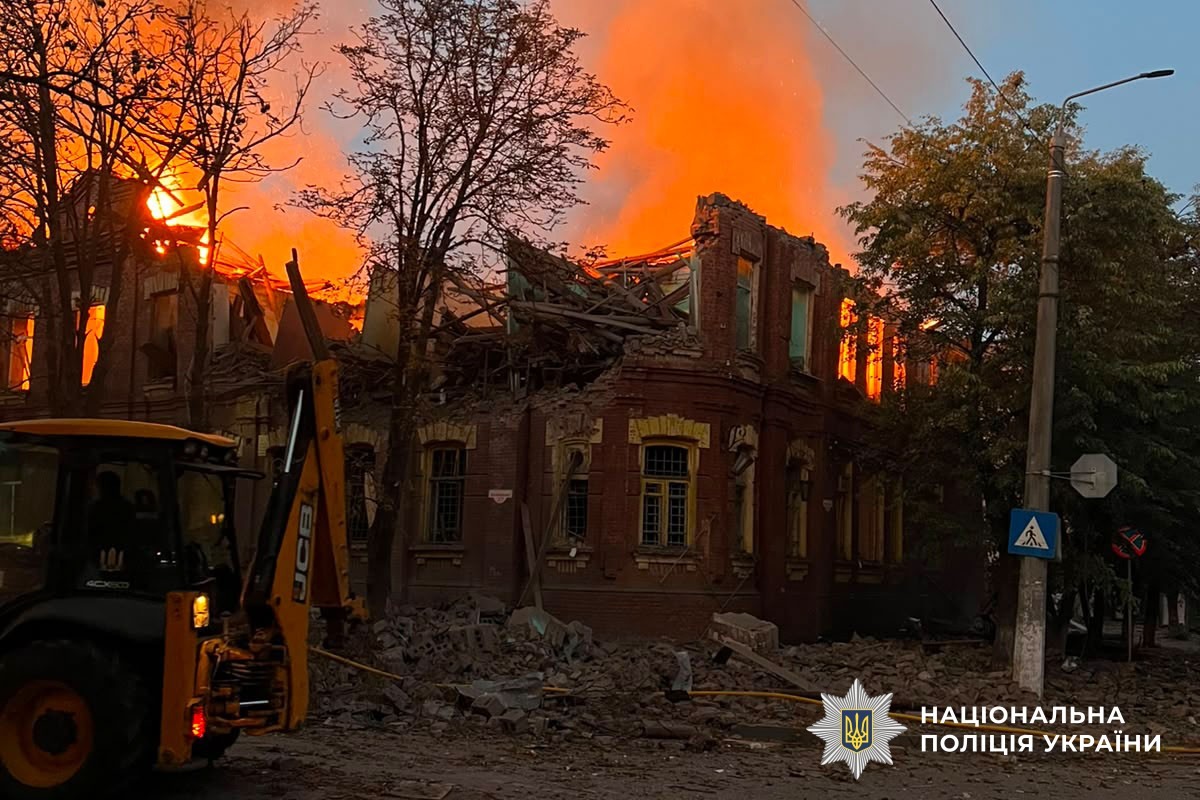
Historic building of printing house in Sloviansk (Donetsk Oblast) after Russian bombing on 26 August

Two people were killed in Russian airstrikes on Zaporizhzhia and Kharkiv Oblasts.

Ukrainian drones struck the Wildberries facility in Kotovsk, setting it ablaze. An oil refinery was also attacked. Ukrainian drone attacks injured two in Kotovsk, while two were killed in Lipetsk Oblast and a third was killed in Belgorod Oblast.

Ukrainian drones and JDAM-LR missiles struck a site in Donetsk being used as a drone assembly point and the headquarters of the 51st Combined Arms Army. Colonel Andrey Vladimirovich Krestyansky killed in the strike, with OSINT discovering he was buried on 9 September 2026. Information from Denis Pushilin indicated that some 20 officers were killed during the attack, eighteen died instantly died and two later from their wounds. The dead officers range from colonels down to lieutenants.

=== 27 August ===
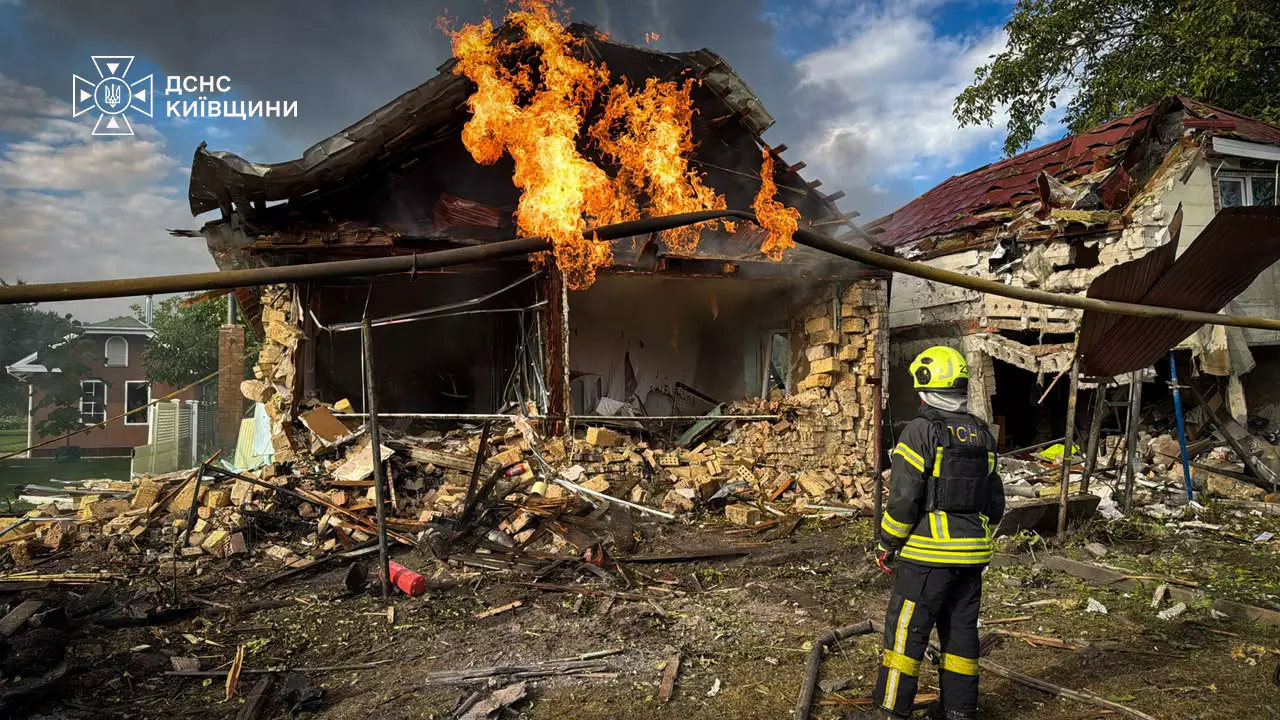
House in Kyiv Oblast after an attack on 27 August

Ukrainian drones struck an Ozon facilities in Orenburg and another near Ufa. Damage was limited and both facilities were evacuated.

Five Russian drones crossed into Moldova from Ukrainian airspace.

A Lieutenant Colonel was killed by a car bomb in St. Petersburg, his wife was seriously injured. The explosion occurred near housing for military personnel.

Romanian authorities announced that the Dominican-flagged cargo vessel PROGRESS IV caught fire and sank 15-20 nautical miles off the coast of Sfântu Gheorghe, Romania. It was reported that the vessel was hit by an unidentified object prior to the sinking. All crew members were rescued.

=== 28 August ===
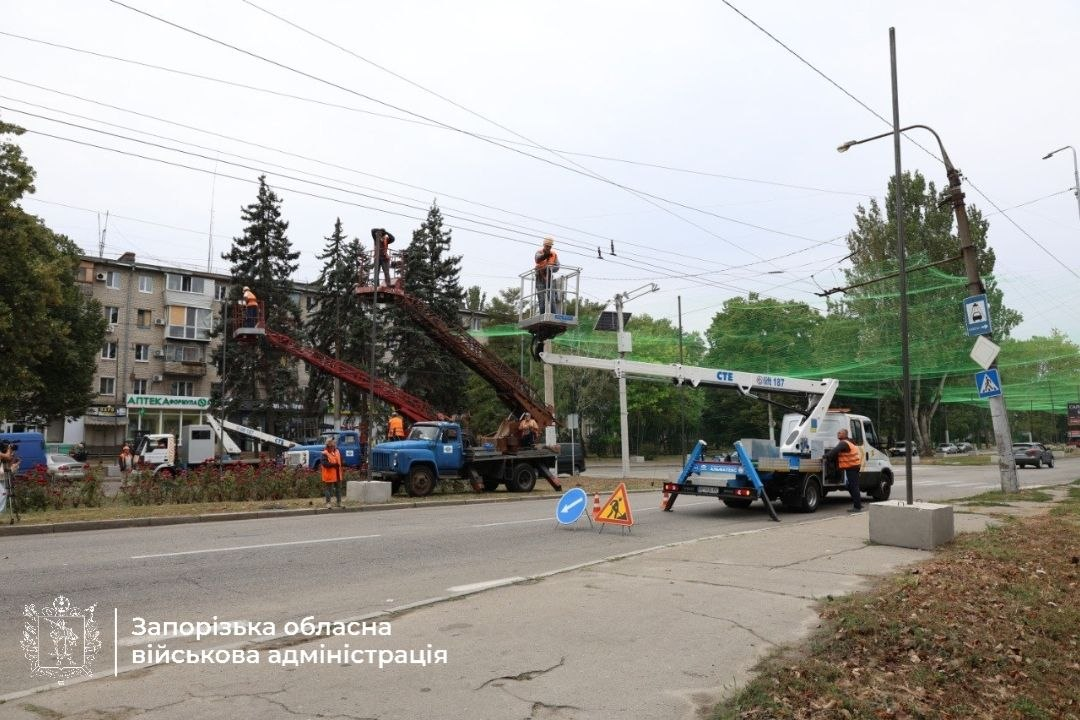
Setup of anti-drone meshes above a street in Zaporizhzhia

Ukrainian drones struck the Yaroslavl oil refinery, resulting in two fires at the facility. A Tu-95 was damaged by Ukrainian drones at the Engels-2 air base. Satellite imagery showed "significant damage to its right wing".

Rostov Oblast governor Yury Slyusar declared a state of emergency due to an inability to export grain following Ukrainian attacks on port infrastructure and shipping in the Sea of Azov.

=== 29 August ===
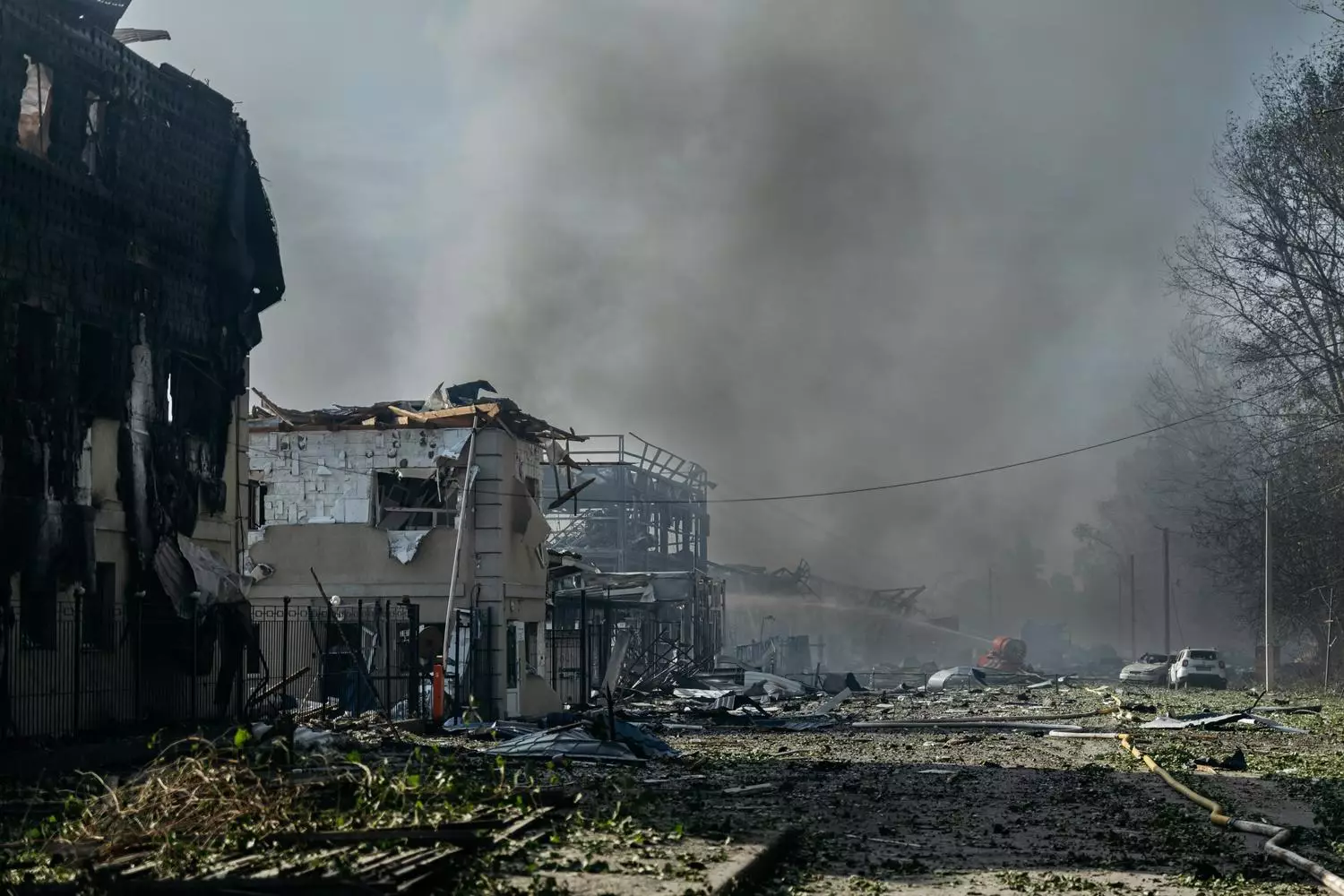
Street in Myla village near Kyiv after the explosion

A Russian strike hit a weapons depot in Myla village in Bucha Raion, causing an explosion that damaged 50 buildings, killed at least 37 people and injured 42 others. Additional Russian attacks killed one person in Odesa and a child in Boryspil, while Ukrainian attacks killed three and injured nine in Belgorod and killed another in Sevastopol.

Ukrainian drones started a “small fire” at the Ozon facility in Rostov-on-Don. A DNS warehouse, an appliance and electronics retailer, in Aksay, Rostov Oblast was set ablaze by Ukrainian drones.

=== 30 August ===
Yeysk air base and Millerovo air bases were attacked by Ukrainian drones. At the Yeysk air base a Ka-27 was destroyed. An Ozon facility, a thermal power plant and television tower were attacked in Belgorod by missiles, killing two and injuring 16.

=== 31 August ===
A Wildberries in Yekaterinburg was attacked by Ukrainian drones; no fire was started at the facility, but residential buildings were damaged.
