= Antipinsky refinery =

Russian oil refinery located in Tyumen

- Location within Tyumen Oblast
- Interactive map of Antipinsky refinery
- Location: Tyumen, Tyumen Oblast, Russian Federation; 57°06′00.1″N 65°45′31.4″E

Refinery details
- Operator: RI-Invest
- Owner: RI-Invest
- Opened: 2006
- Capacity: 180,000 barrels per day (29,000 m^{3}/d)

The Antipinsky refinery (Russian: Антипинский НПЗ, romanized: Antipinskiy NPZ, IPA: [əntʲipʲinʲskʲi]), colloquially known as the Tyumen Oil Refinery, is a Russian oil refinery located in south-east Tyumen, Tyumen Oblast, adjacent to the Tyumen trunk oil pipelines and the Tyumen-3 pumping station. It is one of the largest refineries in Russia, participating in the Urals and West Siberian oil market, where it is the only refinery in operation in the Ural Federal District. As of 2025, it is Russia's largest privately owned oil processing plant, with a total processing capacity of nine million tons of crude oil per year. It is also the only oil refinery constructed in Russia since the dissolution of the Soviet Union.

Antipinsky has grown rapidly since it first began operation, with an almost nine-fold increase in production rates since the plant's inception in 2006. However, this expansion was largely as a result of debt from both Russian and European lenders, and by the late 2010s, the refinery was financially dependent on regular borrowing and prepayments from customers. The owner of the refinery was declared bankrupt in 2019, and both the chief executive officer and majority shareholder, Dmitry Mazurov, were arrested for fraud. The refinery ceased operations for three months following the arrests, before production resumed under new ownership. Mazurov was later jailed for ten years in a high-security penal colony for his role in the fraud and embezzlement, despite prosecutors requesting a sentence of 16.5 years.

== History ==
The construction of the refinery itself began in 2004, although the majority of its equipment was originally acquired by Transneft from Petrofac in the mid-1990s. These elements, which formed part of a modular refinery, were not ultimately used after being held in customs clearance for approximately five years. Eventually, the components for the refinery were sold by the Russian Fund for Federal Property following an internal review of Transneft's business, which determined that refining was outside the scope of its operations. The only bidder in the auction was New Stream, a company controlled by Gennadiy Lisovichenko, a prosecutor, and the businessman Dmitry Mazurov, an acquaintance of Vladimir Putin, who in 2016 owned 80% of the share capital through a Cypriot-registered company named Vikay Industrial Limited.

A share purchase option was exercised in 2016 by Nikolai Egorov, a classmate of Putin at Leningrad State University and a partner in the major Russian law firm Egorov Puginsky Afanasiev & Partners, for 20% of the venture through the Mine Project Corporation, an entity registered in the Seychelles. An additional option to purchase a 25% stock holding in May 2016 was held by Vladimir Kalashnikov, a friend of the then Governor of Tyumen Oblast and the current Mayor of Moscow, Sergei Sobyanin. Both Sobyanin and Transneft fully endorsed and provided assistance with the building of Antipinsky, the latter was particularly interested in the prospect of a refinery located on the trunk oil pipelines adjacent to both major rail tracks and highways. Construction of the refinery was completed two years after it commenced, with the first phase of the facility beginning operations in November 2006 with a capacity of 400,000 tons of oil per annum. An upgrade in 2008 increased the capacity further to 740,000 tons per year before the second area of the refinery was completed in May 2010.

The start of operations in the second phase resulted in Antipinsky being able to refine 2.75 million tons of crude oil per annum, and a modernization program finalized in November 2012 increased this even further to 3.58 million tons. By 2013, total production at Antipinsky amounted to 3 million tons per year, with the operations undertaken at the site gradually increasing in complexity. This included the development of a fuel oil deep conversion unit, a delay tar coking unit, and reaching a refining depth of 97%. In September of the same year, the site also received considerable media interest following a visit from singer-songwriter Grigory Leps, who expressed interest in oil production. Throughout this period, Mazurov spoke optimistically about the future, stating that "We will be the only private independent oil refining enterprise in Russia. Our ambitious plan is that there will be no other serious privately owned oil refinery in the country."

However, New Stream defaulted on a payment in 2018 after it had accrued debt worth $5 billion after the acquisition of numerous other energy assets, including the Mari refinery in the Mari El Republic, and various oil fields in Orenburg Oblast. As a consequence, oil refining at Antipinsky reduced from 7.3 million tons of petroleum in 2017 to 6.4 million tons, occasionally halting entirely. In May 2019, all operations at Antipinsky were suspended after New Stream defaulted on another payment, and both Transneft and the Saint-Petersburg International Mercantile Exchange suspended their business relationships with the refinery. A British court issued a worldwide order to freeze $251 million of Antipinsky's assets and prevent the refinery from selling vacuum gas oil to other companies as a result of a lawsuit by VTB Commodities Trading. In response to the order, a spokesman for Antipinsky said: “Unfortunately, in 2019 a string of traders, including VTB Commodities Trading, in violation of agreements that had been previously reached, stopped providing advances for the purchase of petroleum products. This led to a decrease in the volume of purchased oil and to the plant stopping its processing on April 26.”

Later, it also emerged that New Stream entered into a contract to sell 1,020 tons of diesel in April that year, but did not fulfill the terms of the agreement. Total production in the first six months of that year was less than half of the oil refined in 2018. Describing the situation, an anonymous source stated, "In April (2019), the company almost completely ran out of working capital, there was nothing to buy oil with. The plan was as follows: the management of the refinery had to use the loan and prepayment from traders of petroleum products in order to lead the enterprise out of the crisis." Mazurov was arrested on July 13, 2019, at Sheremetyevo Airport in Moscow on suspicion of assaulting a prostitute and embezzling loans from Sberbank, Promsvyazbank and Absolut Bank worth in excess of $3 billion, although this value was later downgraded to a total of $30 million. Mazurov pled not guilty to all charges, but was later found guilty and sentenced in 2023. Production later resumed at Antipinsky in July 2019 after three months of inactivity.

Of the $5 billion owed, $3.2 billion was due to be paid to New Stream’s largest creditor, Sberbank, who promptly took control of the company after it filed for bankruptcy. Sberbank Capital, Promsvyazbank, Absolut Bank and Credit Europe Bank also filed claims against Mazurov personally for 28.45 billion rubles, 22 billion rubles, 3.3 billion rubles and 854 million rubles respectively. In June 2020, an international arrest warrant was issued for the company's co-founder, Gennadiy Lisovichenko, for fraudulently selling the cargo of a train for almost half of its market value, with the former director later being arrested in Italy. The insolvency of New Stream led to the new owners forming a joint venture with the Azerbaijani oil firm SOCAR, which took a minority share of 9.6% in the refinery.

Sberbank made Antipinsky available for sale immediately after becoming the new majority owner of the plant, mostly due to the considerable financial losses incurred by the refinery, but also due to their lack of interest in entering the petroleum market. Prior to the sale, SOCAR announced that it had no interest in taking control of the business and promptly terminated its partnership with Sberbank. Whilst major oil companies, including Lukoil and Russneft, were believed to be interested in purchasing the business, the refinery received no bids from potential buyers, and Sberbank ultimately included three oil fields in the lot to increase its salability. At an auction held on May 18, 2020, Antipinsky was sold to the only bidder, RusInvest, a company controlled by the Ukrainian businessman Anatoly Yablonsky, who previously fled Ukraine following charges of tax fraud. The total value of the deal was 110 billion rubles, or approximately $1.5 billion.

After the takeover, RusInvest reported nominal revenues of less than $1 million for the refinery, in contrast to the peak of its production when it announced revenues of $5.8 billion. As a result, the owners of the Antipinsky refinery were regarded by the Russian Federal Taxation Service as a small enterprise in 2021. That same year, the refinery owners announced that contracts had been signed with Gunvor, Trafigura and Vitol for the long-term supply of naphtha and diesel from Baltic Sea ports. However, on January 4, 2022, a major fire occurred at the fuel oil deep conversion unit, with over one hundred firemen deployed to extinguish the blaze, which was over one hundred meters high. Although no casualties were reported, production continued to be disrupted at the refinery for many months thereafter.

In the years after the takeover, RusInvest changed its name to RI-Invest and reported revenues of 260.5 billion rubles in 2023, although the company was subject to a lawsuit filed by Transneft for 584 million rubles. In September 2024, RI-Invest completed the purchase of the remaining assets of the Antipinsky refinery from the previous owners during a bankruptcy auction. Despite being placed into bankruptcy almost four years earlier in December 2019, the former owners are still subject to bankruptcy proceedings and owe 18 billion rubles to the Federal Taxation Service. Although the value of the assets at the auction was reported as 3.25 billion rubles, the final price paid by RI-Invest was 292.26 million rubles and included three oil production licenses in Orenburg Oblast, various production facilities, buildings, equipment and office furniture. During the gasoline shortages that affected Russia in 2025, most of the refined products that were produced at the Antipinsky refinery were shipped to and sold at the refineries in Khabarovsk, Komsomolsk-on-Amur, Angarsk, Kemerovo and Surgut.

During the fourth year of the Russo-Ukrainian war, Ukrainian forces began to attack refineries as part of a increasing number of attacks on Russian oil and gas infrastructure and petroleum transportation. In June 2026 it was hit from 2,000km by Ukrainian drone strikes. In late July 2026, the Tyumen Oil Refinery was hit once again by Ukrainian drones, sent 2,000 kilometres flying over Russian territory by the Special Operations Forces, aided by the underground resistance movement Chernaya Iskra ("Black Spark"). Although the facility was equipped with anti-drone netting, video footage has confirmed at least two drones getting through and resulting in fires and thick columns of black smoke rising above the refinery.

== See also ==
- List of oil refineries
- Petroleum industry in Russia
