= Vtorovo =

Vtorovo Второво
- Selo
- Location within Vladimir Oblast Location within Russia
- Coordinates: 56°16′N 40°47′E
- Country: Russia
- Region: Vladimir Oblast
- District: Kameshkovsky District
- Time zone: UTC+3:00

Vtorovo (Russian: Второво) is a rural locality (a selo) and the administrative center of Vtorovskoye Rural Settlement, Kameshkovsky District, Vladimir Oblast, Russia. The population was 990 as of 2010. There are 8 streets.

== Geography ==
Vtorovo is located 20 km southwest of Kameshkovo (the district's administrative centre) by road. Mirny is the nearest rural locality.
