= Lobkovo =

Lobkovo Лобково
- Village
- Location within Vladimir Oblast Location within Russia
- Coordinates: 56°29′N 38°20′E
- Country: Russia
- Region: Vladimir Oblast
- District: Alexandrovsky District
- Time zone: UTC+3:00

Lobkovo (Russian: Лобково) is a rural locality (a village) in Krasnoplamenskoye Rural Settlement, Alexandrovsky District, Vladimir Oblast, Russia. The population was 240 as of 2010. There are 6 streets.

== Geography ==
Lobkovo is located 29 km northwest of Alexandrov (the district's administrative centre) by road. Sushchyovo is the nearest rural locality.
