= Yefimovka =

Yefimovka Ефимовка
- Selo
- Location within Volgograd Oblast Location within Russia
- Coordinates: 50°15′N 44°42′E
- Country: Russia
- Region: Volgograd Oblast
- District: Kotovsky District
- Time zone: UTC+4:00

Yefimovka (Russian: Ефимовка) is a rural locality (a selo) in Moiseyevskoye Rural Settlement, Kotovsky District, Volgograd Oblast, Russia. The population was 239 as of 2010. There are 3 streets.

== Geography ==
Yefimovka is located in steppe, on Volga Upland, on the right bank of the Bolshaya Kazanka River, 13 km southwest of Kotovo (the district's administrative centre) by road. Moiseyevo is the nearest rural locality.
