= Bridges in the Russo-Ukrainian war =

Bridges have been a strategic and tactical aspect of the Russo-Ukrainian War, particularly since the 2022 Russian invasion of Ukraine. As there are more than 23,000 rivers and over 28,000 bridges in Ukraine, several important events, including battles, blocked advances, political disputes, and the successes and failures of army units, have centered around the country’s bridges. The UK Ministry of Defense has said, "River crossing operations are likely to be amongst the most important determining factors in the course of the war".

Upon the Russian invasion, Ukrainian forces destroyed or damaged bridges to slow Russian advances. Russian offensive operations were repeatedly undone by failed river crossings.

As Russia began their retreat, Russian forces began to use large quantities of advanced high precision missiles to damage bridge infrastructure in Ukraine and slow down Ukrainian advances. By July 2022, 305 bridges had been damaged or destroyed.

== Blocking river crossings ==
=== Irpin river ===
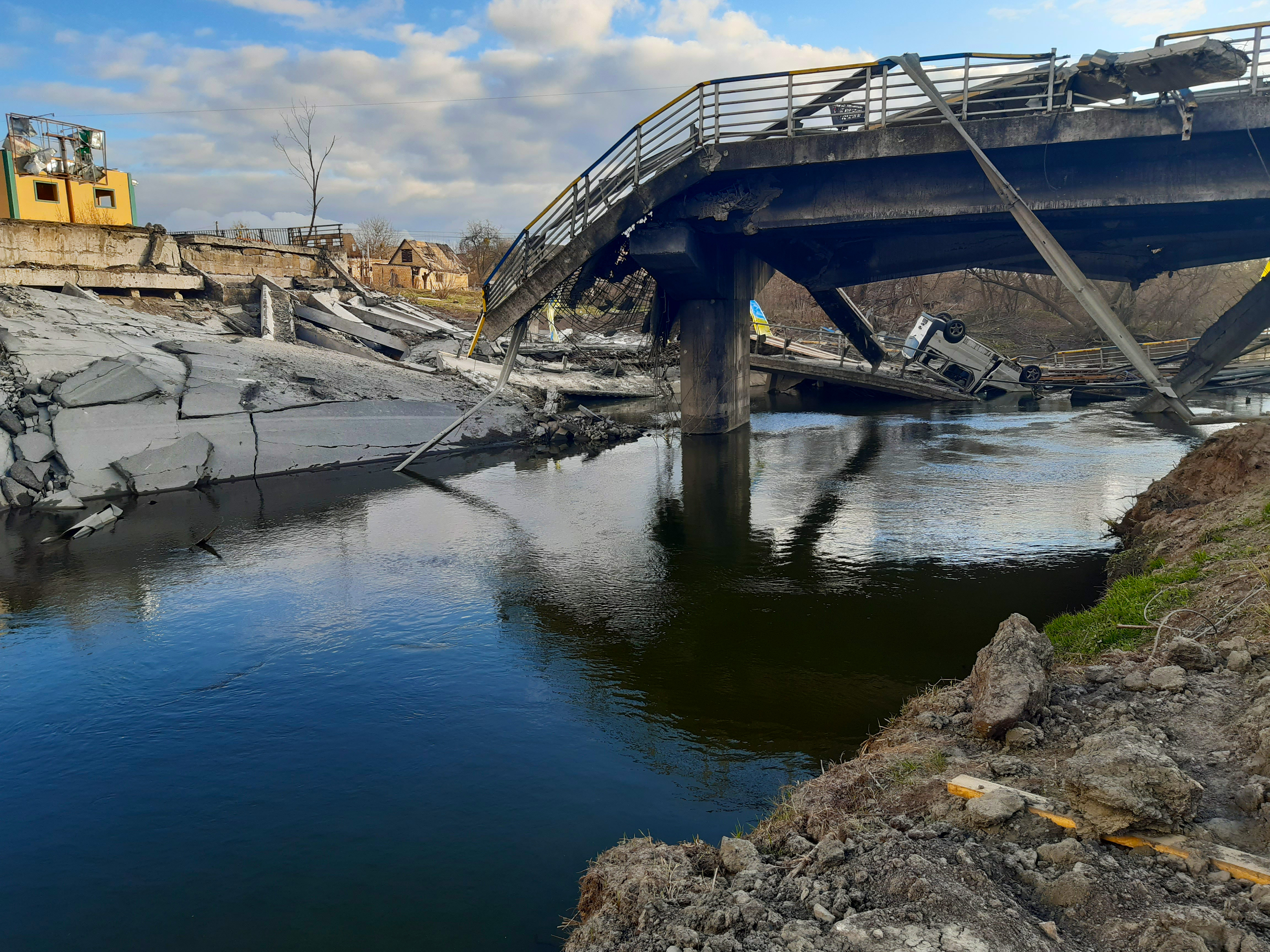
Destroyed bridge at Irpin, 17 April 2022

South of Irpin on the north west outskirts of Kyiv, a Russian convoy, separated from its main force, was ambushed and destroyed on a bridge over the Irpin river, on 25 February 2022.

A few days after a battle in Bucha, a bridge which connected Irpin with Bucha to the north was destroyed by Ukraine. This resulted in Russian forces being blocked from advancing on Kyiv using that route. Before the Battle of Moshchun, the Moshchun Bridge was destroyed, blocking an alternate route near Hostomel to Kyiv.

After continued Russian attempts to cross the Irpin using pontoon bridges Ukrainian forces flooded the area, making it impassable. Russian troops were forced to return to Belarus.

The iconic bridge in Irpin over the Bucha River will remain as a war memorial, with a new bridge being constructed by the Turkish ONUR Group.

=== Dnipro river - Antonivka Bridges and Kakhovka Dam bridges ===
The initial invasion in February 2022 included an attack from the direction of Crimea aiming for Kherson and the Dnipro river, crossed by the Antonivka Road Bridge, where fierce fighting took place for four days, before Russian forces took control of an intact bridge, allowing them to move swiftly further north, capturing Kherson.

The Kakhovka Dam is the other main crossing point of the Dnipro river. Located 60 km east of Kherson, it provides a 3.2 km road and rail link on top of the dam. Captured intact in February 2022, the road and rail infrastructure came under attack by Ukrainian forces in August and September 2022. Damage to the road and rail infrastructure of the dam from artillery blocked Russian trains and vehicles from using it to cross the river.

On 19 July 2022 Ukraine sought to stop Russian vehicles using the Antonivka bridges, both road and rail, by attacking them with HIMARS rockets. The rail bridge was quickly damaged, however it took a week before the road bridge was sufficiently damaged to stop heavy traffic. Repaired within a month, further attacks by Ukrainian missiles again made the bridge unusable, resulting in Russia needing to construct a pontoon bridge from barges to supplement the ferries that were transporting vehicles across the river.

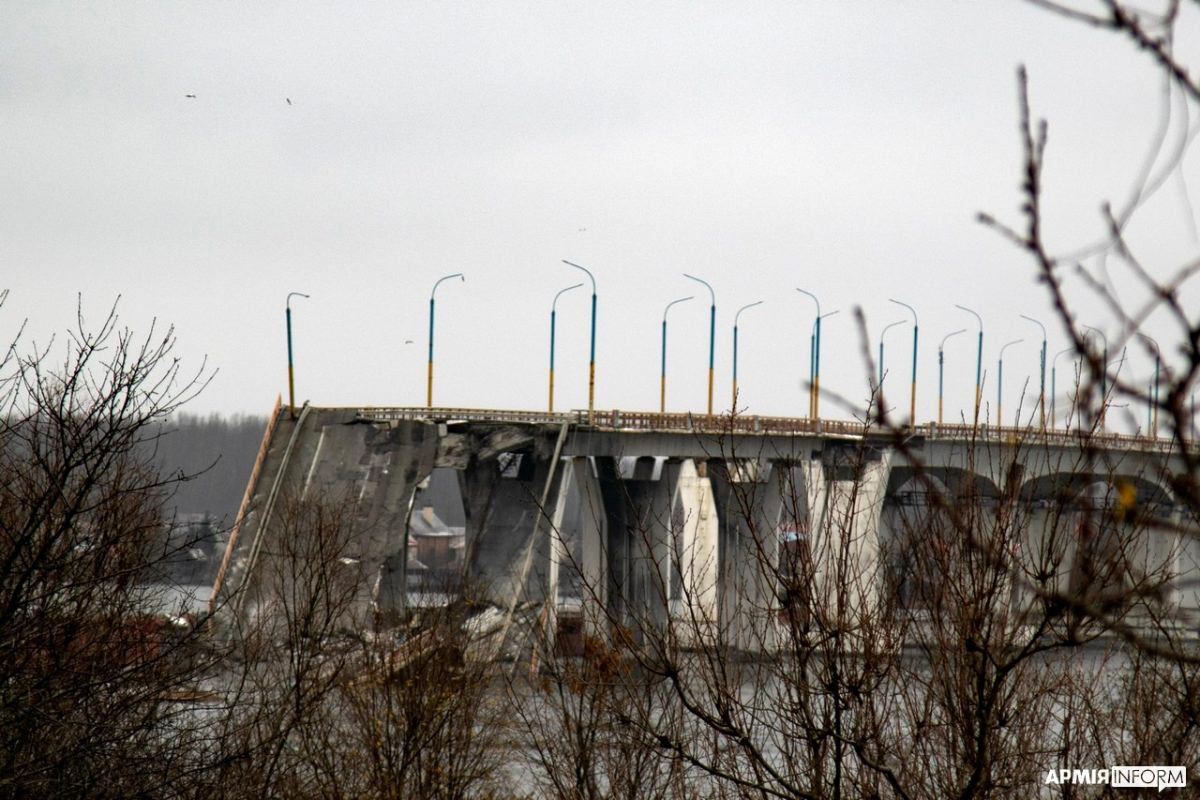
The Antonivka road bridge in December 2022, after the Second Battle of Kherson

The Ukrainian counteroffensive in the autumn of 2022 resulted in Russia evacuating the area including Kherson, mainly via the pontoon bridge before Russia blew a 200m gap in the Antonivka Road Bridge and destroying the pontoon bridge, leaving Russian forces on the south eastern bank of the river. The Russians also blew up the supports of the roadway on the Kakhovka Dam on the 11th of November, whilst leaving the dam itself mainly intact.

The failure of Ukraine to damage/destroy the bridges in February 2022 enabled Russia to advance north and capture the Kherson region. The ability of Ukraine to damage the bridges made it untenable for Russia to continue holding the northern area, including the city of Kherson, so Russia retreated. Russia's destruction of the bridges in November 2022 halted the Ukrainian counteroffensive in the south.

=== Kuchurgan River - Rail connection to Transnistria ===
A bridge on the rail line from Ukraine to Transnistria where it crossed the Kuchurhan River was damaged by Ukraine in March 2022 to block the possibility of Russia using rail transport to link with the Russian troops in Transnistria.

== Damaging logistics routes ==
Russian armed forces are dependent on rail links to supply them with heavy logistics, including ammunition, and to move troops around the country. Damage caused to rail lines can be quickly repaired, however, damage to rail bridges can disrupt supplies for weeks.

=== Bridges connecting Crimea ===
==== Kerch Strait bridges ====
CCTV footage of the 2022 Crimean Bridge explosion

The Kerch Strait road and rail bridge, constructed by Russia after their annexation of Crimea in 2014, is 19 km long and spans the Kerch Strait, between Russia and Crimea.

On 8 October 2022, an explosion collapsed a section on one side of the road into the sea and damaged the other road section. A train was passing the impact point and the explosion caused a fire on the train, the heat from the fire damaging the rail bridge. Russia had to look to land routes for rail routes and ferries for road supplies heading to Crimea, with civilian as well as military supplies, until the bridge was partly reopened to road traffic, with the bridge fully repaired within 4 months. The main aim of the attack was to disrupt Russian logistics.

On 17 July 2023, a second attack took place, this time by sea drones, with two explosions that damaged the road bridge. The aim of the attack was to damage the logistical capabilities of the bridge. It was reported that repair work was completed in mid October 2023.

Russian concern at losing the rail connection to Crimea over the Kerch bridge has resulted in a new 370km railway line being built from Rostov-on-Don across southern Ukraine to Yakymivka near Melitopol, in January 2024 a partially completed railway bridge near Hranitne NE of Mariupol, on the route of the new track, was destroyed by Ukrainian missiles. Concern also caused Russia to ship munitions by sea, the Russian landing ship Novocherkassk was loaded with munitions when it was hit by a missile at the Crimea port of Feodosia on 26 December 2023, the secondary explosion of the munitions destroying the ship.

==== Syvash lagoon and North Crimean Canal bridges ====
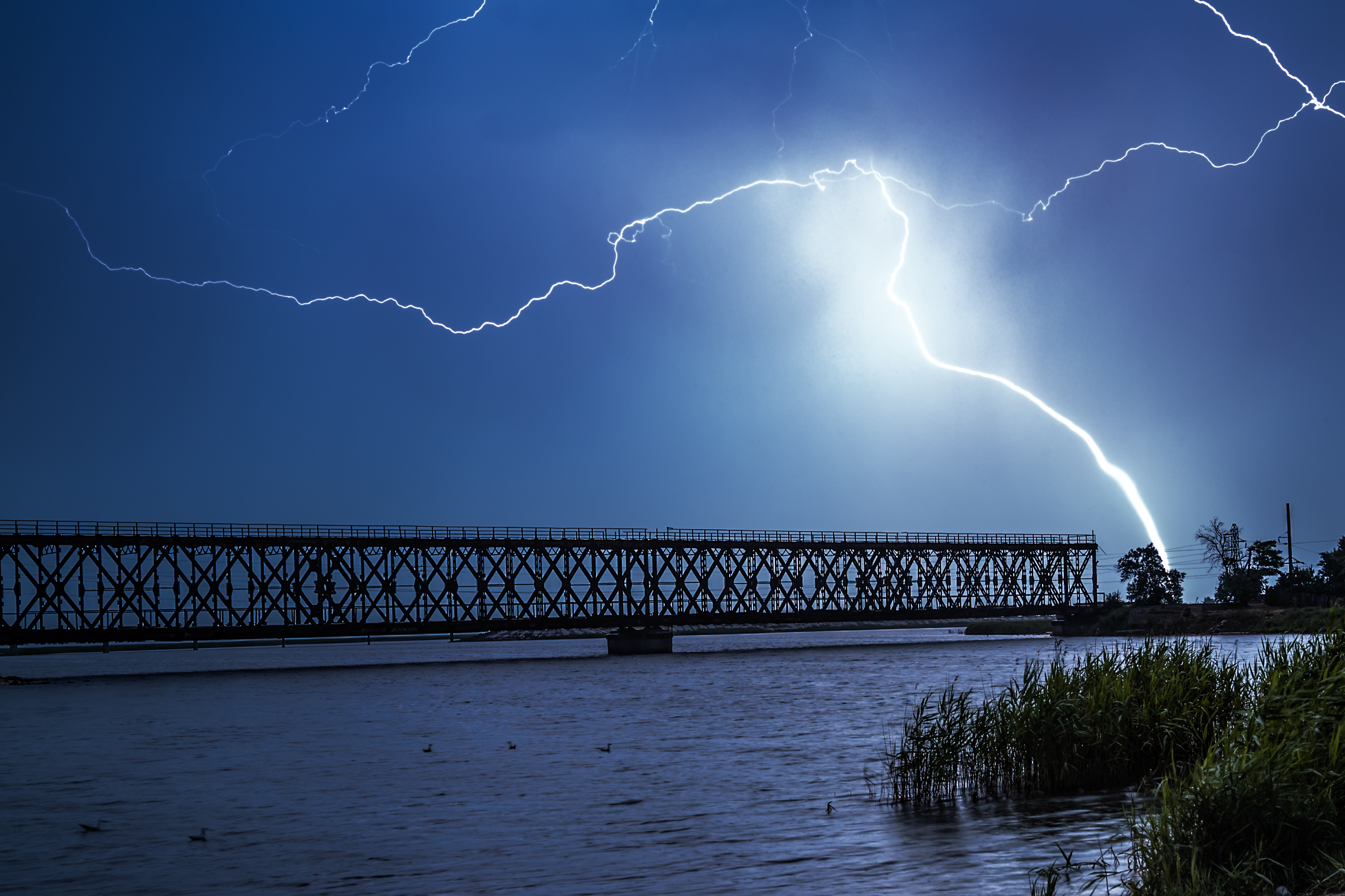
Henichesk Iron Bridge, June 2021

Apart from the Kerch Bridge in the east, at least ten Ukrainian attacks were carried out against seven other bridges connecting Crimea to mainland Ukraine in the north in a single week in mid-June 2026. On 23 June 2026, the railway bridge across the North Crimean Canal near Rozolne was reportedly destroyed as well.

Bridges across the Syvash lagoon:

- The Chonhar Road Bridge across the Chonhar Strait
- The Chonhar Rail Bridge across the Chonhar Strait
- A pontoon bridge across the Chonhar Strait
- The Henichesk Iron Bridge across the Henichesk Strait

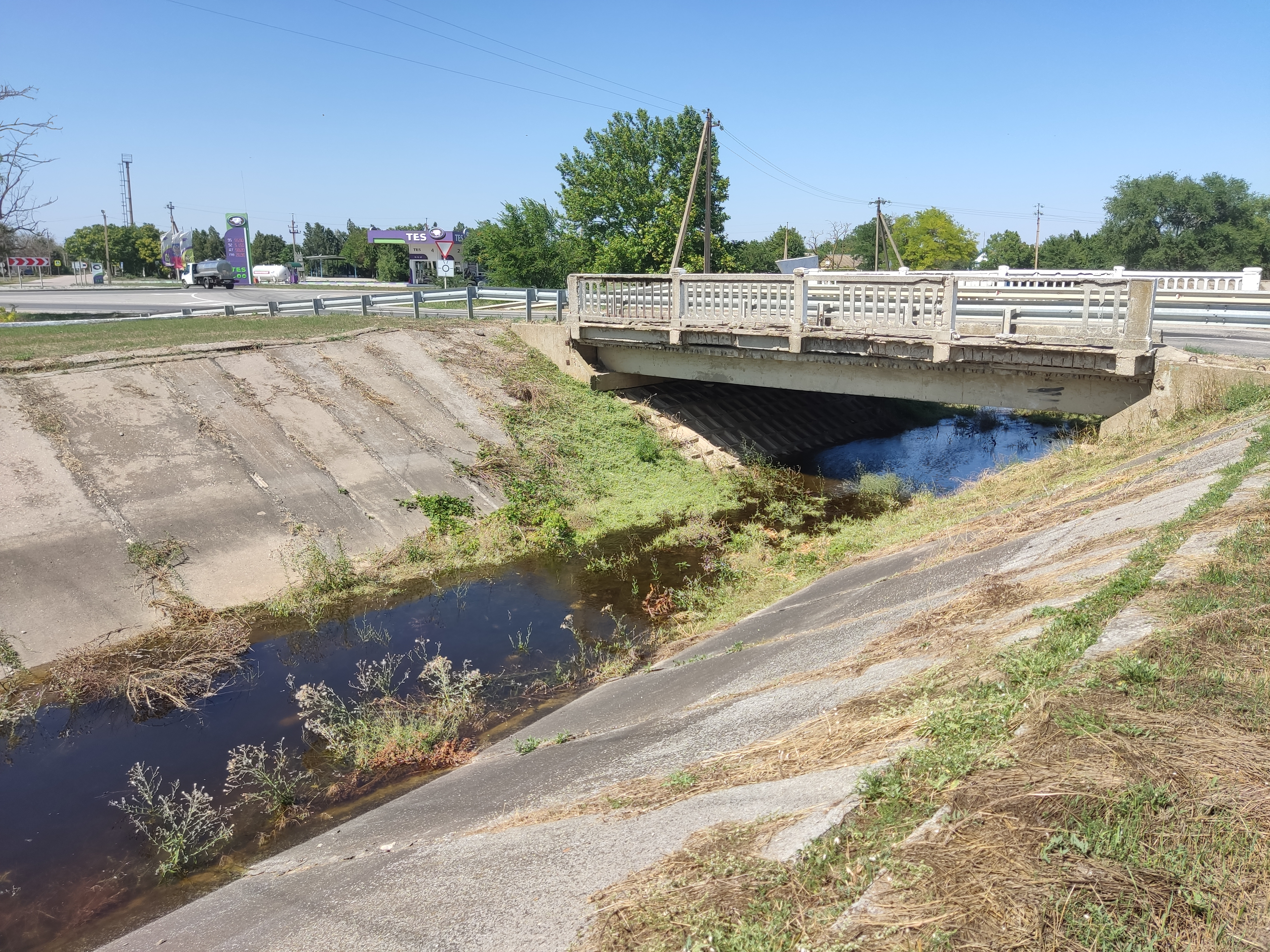
North Crimean Canal bridge near Rozdolne, July 2022

Bridges across the North Crimean Canal:

- The Canal bridge near Perekop
- The Canal Perekop–Armiansk road bridge
- The Canal Perekop–Armiansk rail bridge
- The Canal bridge near Stavky in Skadovsk Raion
- The Canal bridge near Myrne
- The Canal bridges near Rozdolne in Feodosia Raion: the road bridge was reportedly destroyed on 18 June, the railway bridge on 22 June, with an additional strike targeting Russian repair machinery on 23 June.
- The Canal railway bridge near Vladislavivka railway station in Feodosia Raion, on 19 June reported as having been struck by Ukrainian forces.

===== Chonhar bridges =====
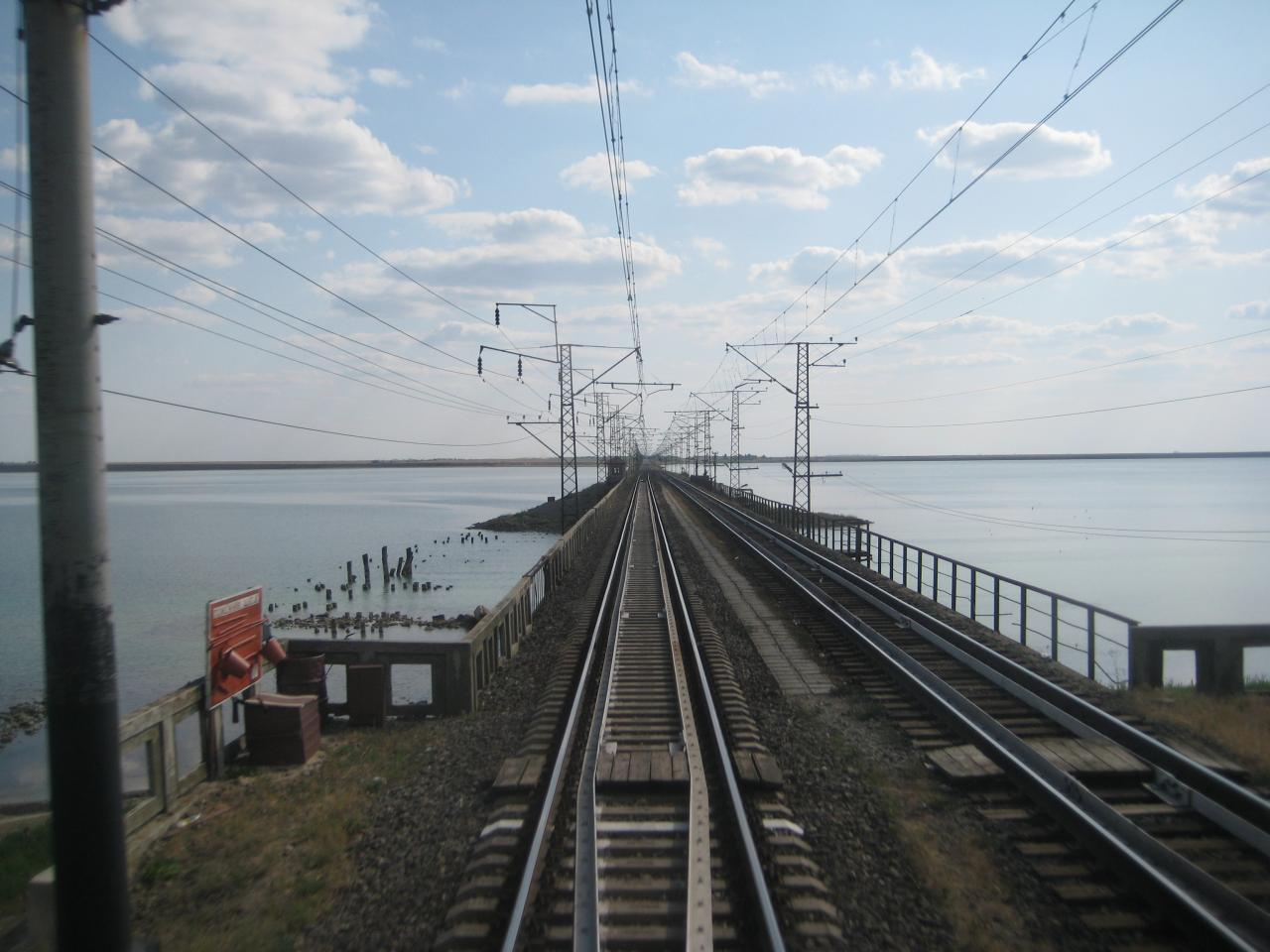
Chonhar railway bridge in September 2016

The Chonhar road bridge carries the Highway M18/E105 over the Chonhar Strait, connecting Crimea with the eastern Kherson area. Seized by Russia in 2014, it formed the de facto border until 2022. In June 2023 a Ukrainian missile hit the bridge, punching a hole through the surface, badly damaging it. Russia's response was to direct traffic through Armiansk and Perekop and to build a pontoon bridge within 24 hours. It was struck a second time in early August 2023.

The Chonhar railway bridge at Syvash village, a few kilometres west of the road bridge, is the major rail connection from Crimea to the rest of Russian-occupied southern Ukraine. On 30 July 2023, the approach was struck, with both tracks damaged, by a Storm Shadow cruise missile fired by Ukraine.

=== Rail bridges ===
A number of rail bridges have been damaged by sabotage, including a rail bridge on 3 July 2022 between Melitopol and Tokmak with a further rail bridge destroyed south west of Melitopol on 3 August 2022 and a third near Starobohdanivka north of Melitopol was damaged in November 2022 by Ukrainian defense forces.

In addition to delaying logistics or forcing them onto a route that is vulnerable, troops need to be deployed to defend all rail bridges.

=== Zatoka bridge ===
The Zatoka bridge, on the coast west of Odesa, is the only direct land connection from Odesa to Romania.

Russian forces attacked the bridge due to its importance to export Ukrainian produce and import weapons and ammunition from the west. The bridge was attacked by Russia in April and May 2022 with artillery and then in July with high precision missiles.

In August 2022, understanding the vulnerability of the Zatoka bridge, Ukraine decided to create an alternative land-based rail link with Romania by renovating an old disused line, the work was completed by Romania and Ukraine in January 2023

Although still not repaired, the Zatoka bridge, which has a vertical lift system, was attacked again in February 2023 by Russia using a drone boat.

=== Building new bridges ===
In June 2023 an agreement was reached to build a 641 m long two lane road bridge, with two safety lanes, cycle and pedestrian lanes across the Dniester River (Nistru River in Moldova) with a 667 m viaduct on the Ukrainian side to connect Cosăuţi, Moldova with Yampil in Ukraine, to be completed by 2025, with the aim of improving trade and logistics.

In October 2023 it was agreed to build a bridge connecting Sighetu Marmației in Romania with Ukraine's Bila Tserkva, Zakarpattia Oblast. A 261m long bridge over the Tisza river, to be completed by December 2024, financed by Romania and the EU.

== Creating river crossings ==
Russian infantry fighting vehicles and troop carriers are amphibious. However, a bridge is needed for most heavier vehicles and logistics, especially where the water is deep, wide, or fast-moving. Unless secured properly, pontoons can break free and drift down river.

=== Pontoon bridges ===
==== Siversky Donets River ====
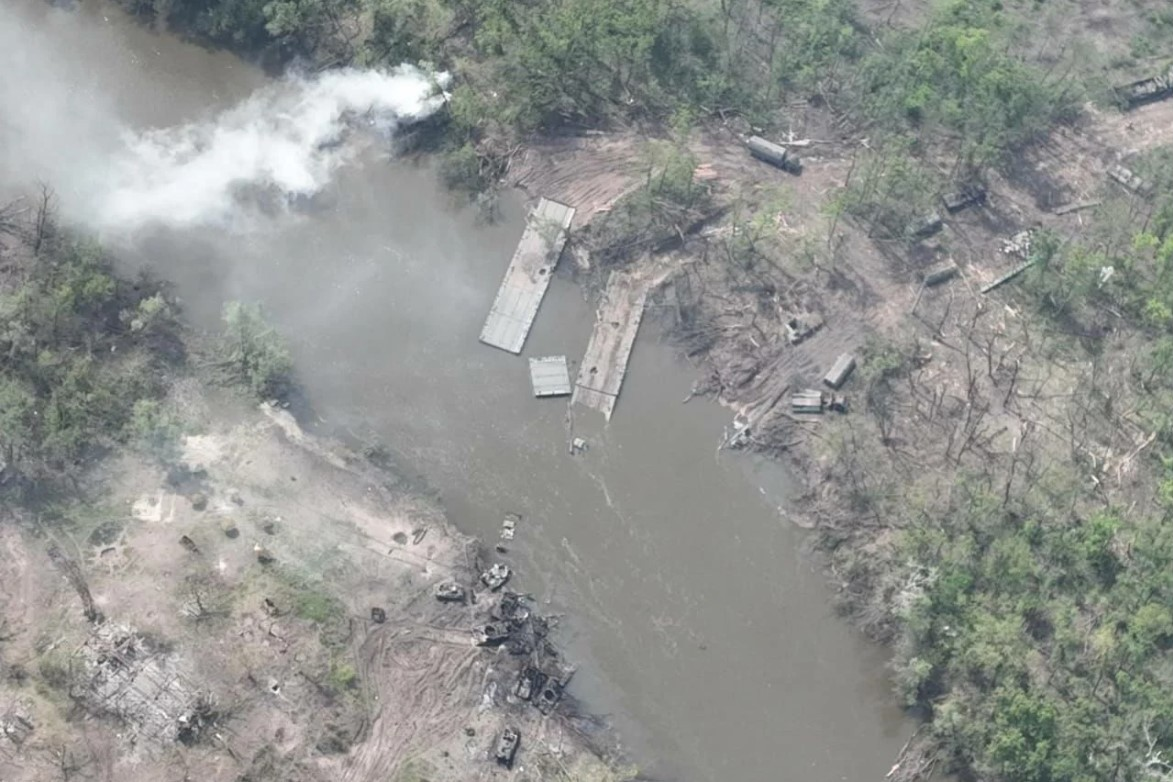
Destroyed Russian floating bridge and vehicles near Bilohorivka on the Siversky Donets River

With Ukraine having destroyed the original bridges over the Siversky Donets, the Russian attempt at advancing by crossing the river in Eastern Ukraine in May 2022 required Russia to build a military pontoon bridge. Russia constructed several. One of these pontoons resulted in a concentration of Russian vehicles in a range of Ukrainian artillery. As soon as the bridge was damaged, more pontoons had to be brought up, and the resultant traffic jam was hit repeatedly by artillery. Ukraine claimed a battle group of over 70 military vehicles destroyed, together with around 500 troops killed, including the Russian colonel commanding the engineers.

==== Inhulets river ====
In September 2022, as part of the Kherson counteroffensive, Ukrainian forces bridged the Inhulets River in southern Ukraine. Pontoon bridges would often be destroyed in this attempt. A pontoon bridge would be built within three hours, and Russian artillery would destroy it within 24 hours, requiring another pontoon bridge to be made. This process was repeated throughout the offensive.

== Bridges as political symbols in the war ==
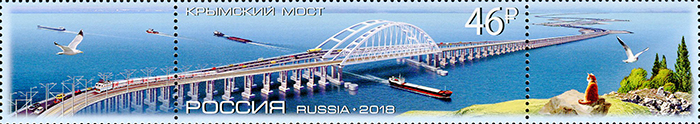
Crimean Bridge on a 2018 Russian postage stamp

The Crimean road bridge over the Kerch Strait was an important political symbol for Russia's claim on Crimea. Comments made after the second successful attack in July 2023 highlight the bridge as a vital symbol of the Russian claim to sovereignty over Crimea and Russia's failure, yet again, to defend the bridge. In particular, Ukrainian President Volodymyr Zelenskyy called the bridge a legitimate military target for Ukraine that must be "neutralized" for "feeding the war with ammunition" and "militarizing the Crimean Peninsula."

In retaliation to the first attack, Russia used cruise missiles to attack Ukrainian infrastructure, including a bridge in Kyiv, known as the ‘’glass bridge’’, a pedestrian bridge in a park. The bridge was damaged, but reopened 8 weeks later.

As a result of the damage to the Antonivka Road Bridge, Russia withdrew its forces from Kherson on 11 November 2022.

== Repairing bridges ==
There are over 16,000 road bridges in Ukraine, 5,996 being on state roads. As of June 2023, 346 road bridges and overpasses had been destroyed. 85 temporary crossings have been built. 41 bridges were rebuilt in 2022 with a further 40 planned for 2023.

Roughly 10% of Ukraine's 28,000 bridges require some repair work.

The UK government provided finance and links to technical expertise to repair bridges around Kyiv, other countries have also provided funds and assistance.

In October 2023 United24 completed their 19th bridge rebuild, with a bridge in the Mykolaiv Oblast across the Inhulets river.

=== Northwest of Kyiv ===
Two rail bridges over the Irpin river were damaged on 5 March 2022 by Russian artillery and destroyed on 21 March 2022 in a collapse. The first bridge was repaired by 7 May 2022, the second bridge was repaired by November 2022.

Bridges supporting the main motorway west from Kyiv, the M06, were dropped where they crossed the Irpin river to close the route to Russian forces, a temporary detour for two weeks was followed by one span being repaired to allow transport vehicles to pass, before the second was repaired.

By December 2023 four local community bridges in the Narodychi region had been restored, the last two taking 5 months and costing UAH 8 million..

== Temporary bridges ==
The Czech Republic was the first to supply temporary bridges to Ukraine, easy to transport, assemble and disassemble. In July 2022 France announced it would supply Ukraine with 36 prefabricated, easily assembled, road and rail bridges that are 23 and 46 meters long. Bridges have also come from Germany.

Pontoon bridges had been given to Ukraine by the Netherlands and the Czech Republic in 2023 which can be assembled as fast as 90 feet (27 meters) a minute.

Germany has supplied Beaver bridge laying tanks, capable of bridging a gap of 60 feet (18 meters), with the United States also providing armored bridge layers. The bridge layers often being used to assist in crossing anti-tank ditches.

Russia has an MTU-72 (Mostoukladchik-72 - (Bridge-Laying Vehicle-72)) armored bridge layer carrying a 20 meter long bridge. Russia's other older dry bridging system for narrower ditches/waterways is the TMM-3 (Tyazhelo Mekhniznrovanny Most - (Heavy Mechanized Bridge)) a 10 meter long bridge carried by truck which can be linked to form a maximum of 40 meters.

For wet crossings, Russia uses the PP-61 pontoon bridges (Pontonno-Mostovoy Park - (Pontoon Bridge Park)) using 50 trucks to transport 12 BMK tugboats with 32 floating sections and 4 abutments. A newer system, the PP-2005 Floating Bridge where a 268 meter pontoon can carry 60 tons with shorter pontoons carrying greater loads and sections can be used as ferries. Russia also has PMM-2M tracked amphibious bridging ferries based on a T-64 main battle tank chassis, capable of carrying 42.5 tons.

After an overweight truck caused a bridge to collapse over the Teresva River in the Zakarpattia region of western Ukraine in July 2023, Ukraine used four sections of the TMM-3 bridge system to install an alternative route within two days.

== See also ==
- List of bridges in Ukraine
- Rail war in Russia (2022–present)
- Rail war in Belarus (2022–present)
