= Port of Henichesk =

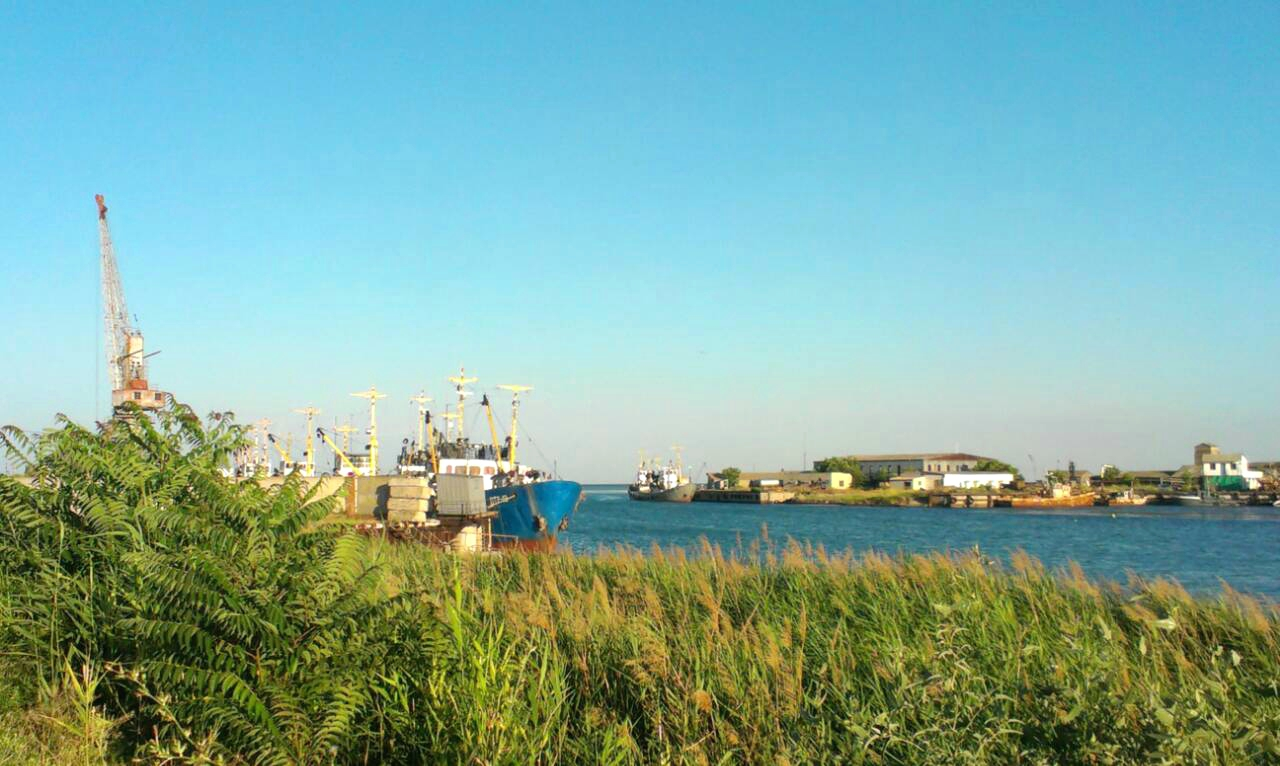
- Click on the map for a fullscreen view
- Native name: Генічеський морський порт

Location
- Country: Ukraine
- Location: Henichesk
- Coordinates: 46°09′45″N 34°48′31″E

Henichesk Seaport is a sea trade port, that is affiliated with the Port of Berdiansk, on the shores of the Henichesk Strait, which connects the Utlyuk estuary and the Syvash Bay of the Sea of Azov, in the city of Henichesk, Kherson Oblast. Henichesk Seaport is managed by the Administration of Berdiansk Sea Commercial Port - a branch of the Ukrainian Sea Ports Authority under the leadership of the Ministry of Infrastructure (Ukraine).
