= Chonhar =

Rural locality in Kherson Oblast, Ukraine

Chonhar Чонгар
- Village
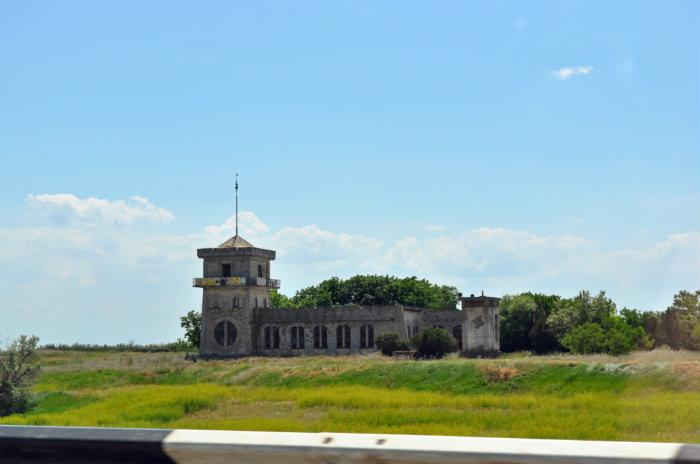
- Abandoned café "Chonhar", near the old road bridge
- Interactive map of Chonhar
- Location of Chonhar Chonhar (Crimea) Chonhar (Ukraine)
- Coordinates: 46°01′51″N 34°32′45″E
- Country: Ukraine
- Oblast: Kherson Oblast
- Raion: Henichesk Raion
- Hromada: Henichesk urban hromada

Population (2001)
  - Total: 1,431

Chonhar (Ukrainian: Чонгар), transliterated sometimes as Chongar (Russian: Чонгар), is a village on the Chonhar Peninsula, within the swampy region of Syvash, in Henichesk Raion, Kherson Oblast. The village is a seat of the Chonhar rural community (silrada). It belongs to Henichesk urban hromada, one of the hromadas of Ukraine. The village is just north of Chonhar Strait, which is part of the boundary between Kherson Oblast and Crimea.

== Geography ==
The village is on the Chonhar Peninsula in Kherson Oblast. It is just north of Chonhar Strait, a shallow waterway that separates the peninsula and mainland Ukraine from the isthmus of Crimea. Highway M18/E105 runs through the eastern end of the village and crosses a bridge over Chonhar Strait, parallel to an older, unused road bridge. The Chonhar bridge is one of three main hard surface routes to and from Crimea. The Novooleksiivka–Dzhankoi railway line runs through the eastern end of the village, then on to Syvash village and over a bridge across the sea to Crimea.

== History ==
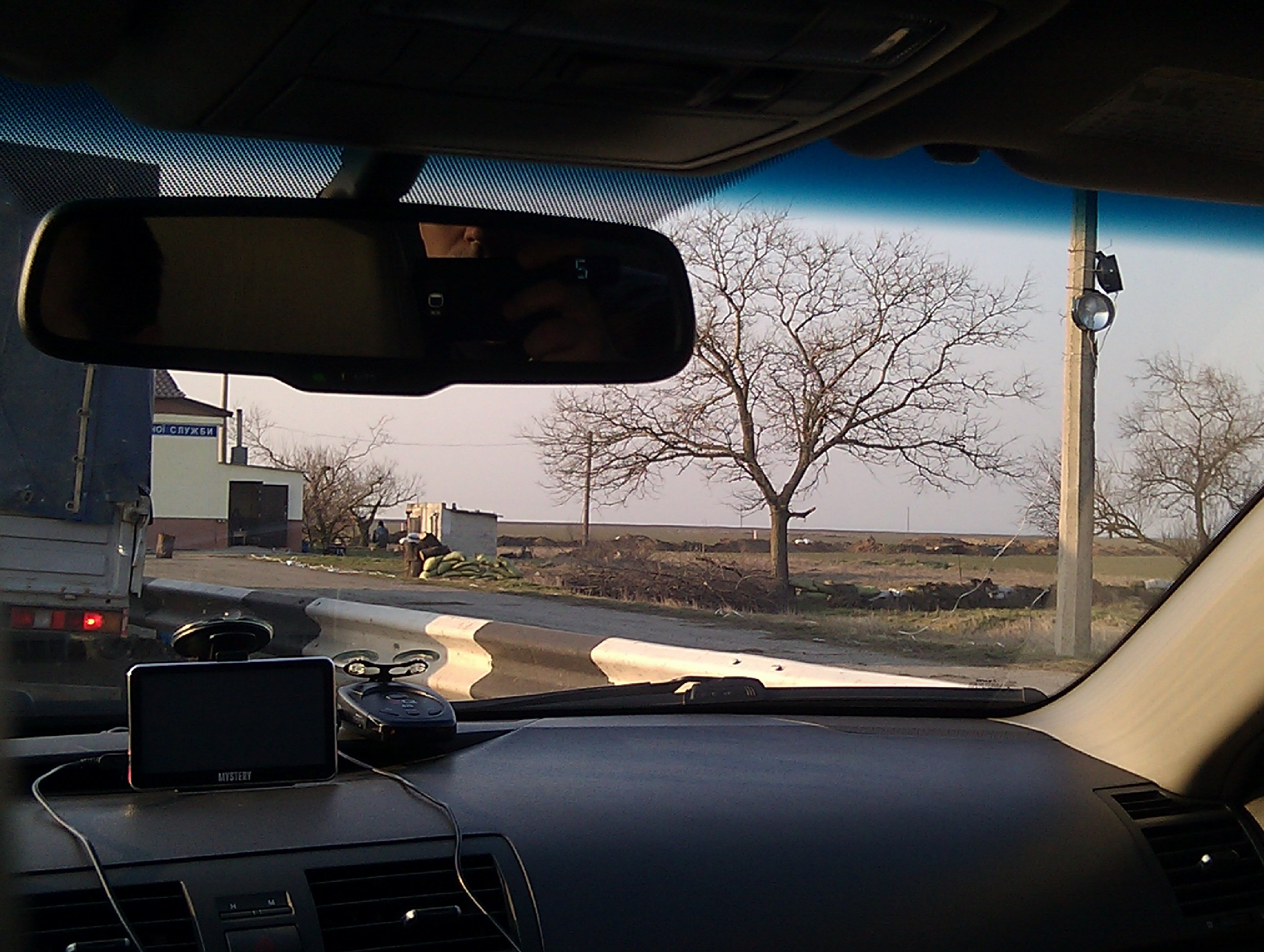
Russian military checkpoint in 2014

On 27 February 2014, during the 2014 Crimean crisis, Berkut (special police) of Crimea occupied the checkpoint near Chonhar and neighbouring territory. After Russia annexed Crimea, the area became a de facto border patrolled by Berkut and Russian troops. By 27 December 2014 Russian forces had fully withdrawn from the Chonhar peninsula.

Chonhar was captured by Russian ground forces on the first day of the Russian Invasion of Ukraine phase of the Russo-Ukrainian War when they crossed into mainland Ukraine from already Russian-occupied Crimea.

The Highway M18/E105 bridge over Chonhar Strait was damaged on 22 June 2023 in an apparent Ukrainian missile strike.

The bridge was damaged by Ukrainian strikes on June 7, 2026, and partially destroyed on June 9, 2026. On June 11, a temporary pontoon was built.

== Demographics ==
As of the 2001 Ukrainian census, Chonhar had a population of 1,431 inhabitants. The native language composition was as follows:

First languages in Chonhar
	percent
Ukrainian	59.3%
Russian	35.2%
Armenian	4.5%
Belarusian	0.3%
Moldovan	0.2%
others	0.5%

== See also ==
- Strilkove
