= Chongar Strait =

Strait between eastern Crimea and mainland Ukraine

- Чонгарська протока (Ukrainian)
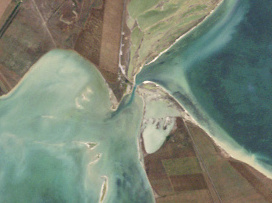

- Location within Crimea Location within Ukraine Location within Europe
- Coordinates: 45°59′12.0″N 34°33′07.0″E
- Type: Strait
- Basin countries: Ukraine
- Max. length: 80–150 m (260–490 ft)
- Min. width: 300 m (980 ft)
- Max. depth: 3 m (9.8 ft)

The Chongar Strait (Ukrainian: Чонгарська протока; Russian: Чонгарский пролив; Crimean Tatar: Çonğar boğazı), also called the Chonhar Strait, is a short, shallow, narrow strait in Ukraine, separating the eastern and western portions of the Syvash, the shallow lagoon system separating Crimea from the mainland east of the Isthmus of Perekop.

== Geography ==
The Chongar Strait separates Chonhar Peninsula in the north (on the mainland, and containing the village of Chonhar) from the Tup-Dzhankoi Peninsula in the south (in Crimea). The strait is about 300 metres (980 ft) long, varying in width from 80–150 metres (260–490 ft) and is less than 3 metres (9.8 ft) deep.

The Chonhar Bridge is a road bridge that crosses the strait and carries the Ukrainian M18 highway, which is part of European route E105 running from northern Norway to Yalta. An older bridge, which runs parallel a few dozen meters away to the south-southwest, is no longer used. There is no railway bridge across the strait, but a rail bridge a few kilometres west at Syvash village (also on Chonhar Peninsula) is sometimes also called Chonhar Bridge.

== History ==
=== Russian Civil War ===
During the Russian Civil War, the Chongar Strait was one avenue of attack during the Perekop-Chongar Operation in November 1920 and was crossed by the Soviet 30th Rifle Division. The operation resulted in the Soviet capture of Crimea and forced the final evacuation of Pyotr Wrangel's White Army and the end of the Civil War in the south.

=== Russo-Ukrainian War ===
Between 2014 and 2022, the Chonhar Strait formed part of the de facto border between mainland Ukraine and the Russian-annexed Crimean peninsula, and was militarized. Around 22 June 2023, amidst the full-scale Russian invasion of Ukraine in which Russian forces had seized parts of southeast Ukraine bordering Crimea, Russian-installed occupation officials announced that Ukraine had damaged the highway bridge crossing the Chonhar Strait with one or more Storm Shadow missiles. Russia quickly built a pontoon bridge. Ukraine damaged the bridge again (along with the bridge of Henichesk Strait) with Storm Shadow missiles on 6 August 2023. On 15 August the bridge was reopened after repairs.

The bridge was damaged by Ukrainian strikes on June 7, 2026, and partially destroyed on June 9, 2026. On June 11, a temporary pontoon was built.
