= Chonhar Peninsula =

Natural peninsula in Ukraine

- Peninsula
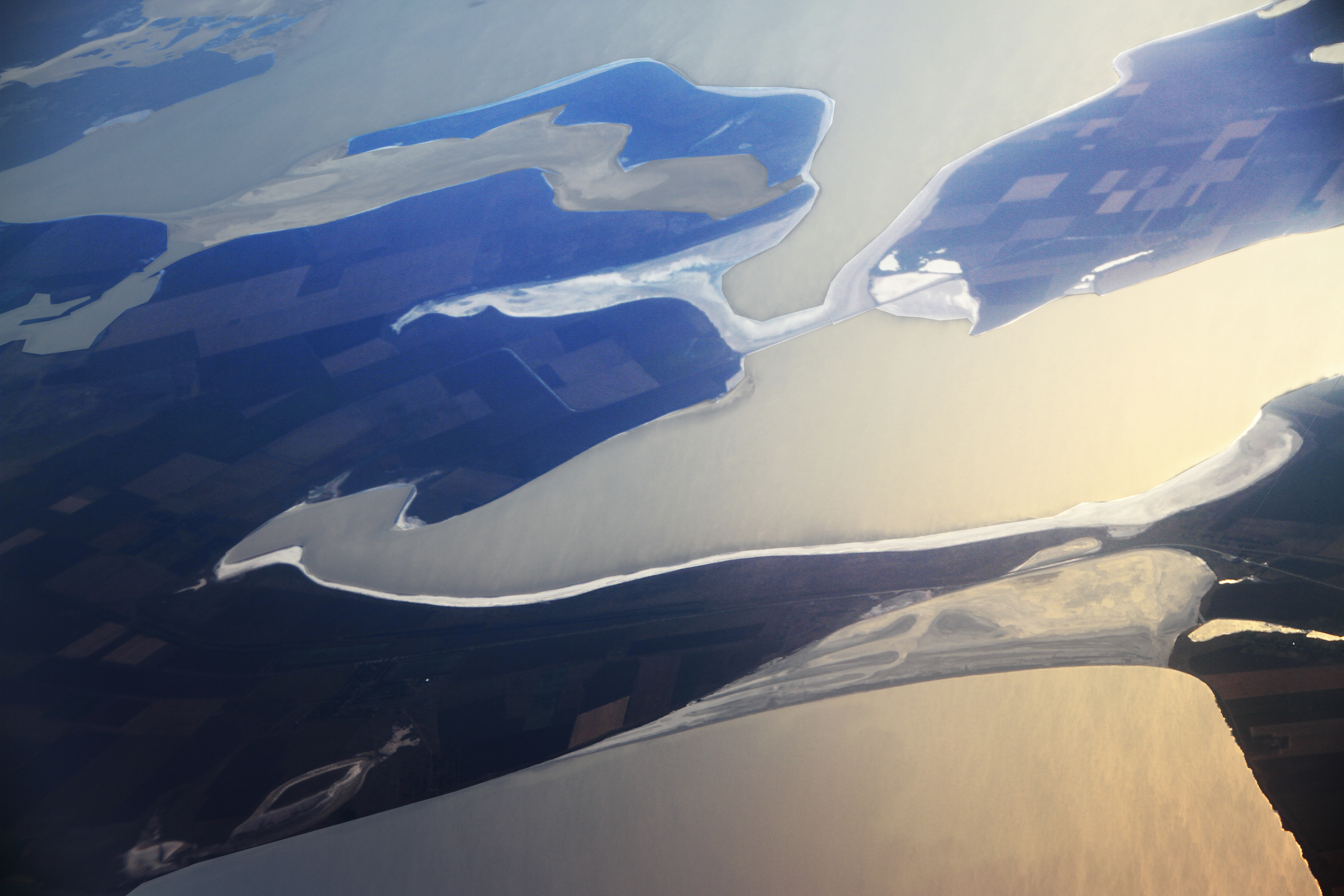
- Northern part of Chonhar peninsula with two parts of the mainland on the right. View from altitude 12,000 m.

- Location within Crimea
- Interactive map of Chonhar Peninsula
- Coordinates: 46°03′40″N 34°31′33″E
- Location: Chonhar, Syvash, Ukraine

The Chonhar Peninsula (Russian and Ukrainian: Чонгар; Crimean Tatar: Чонгъар, romanized: Çonğar) is on the northern coast of the Syvash, and in the Kherson Oblast of Ukraine.

Administratively, the whole peninsula houses the Chonhar rural community of Henichesk Raion. Together with the Tup-Dzhankoi part of the Crimean peninsula which reaches towards it, the Chonhar Peninsula divides the Syvash lagoons into two parts: eastern and western.

Several bridges and embankments connect the Chonhar Peninsula with the Crimean Peninsula to the south. The Chonhar Peninsula has one of the three main road connections between Crimea and mainland Europe, the others being on the Perekop Isthmus to the west and the Arabat Spit to the east. The main Chonhar road bridge crosses the narrowest gap, the Chonhar Strait near the village of Chonhar. It runs more or less parallel to the old road bridge, which is nearby to the south-southwest. The Novooleksiivka–Dzhankoi railway line runs over a bridge and embankment across the lagoon near the village of Syvash.

== History ==
On 26 December 2014, the Chonhar checkpoint was returned to the control of Ukraine. It was previously occupied by the Berkut forces after they defected during the Annexation of Crimea, where they then mined the territory. Previously, on 9 December, the head of the State Border Guard Service, Viktor Nazarenko, announced they had reached an agreement for the withdrawal of troops from occupied parts of Kherson. The blockade point at Chohnar, since the annexation of Crimea, has served to attract some teenage Crimean Tatars from escaping conscription into the Russian Army. Some Chechen activists have also participated in this, and there have been multiple instances of Crimean Tatar and Islamic flags being hung in the vicinity of Chonhar.

Chonhar Peninsula was occupied by Russian forces during the Russo-Ukrainian War.

== See also ==
- Isthmus of Perekop
