= 2023 Crimean Bridge explosion =

2023 explosion on the Crimean Bridge

- Part of the Crimea attacks during the Russo-Ukrainian war
- Date: 17 July 2023
- Time: 3:04 a.m. 3:20 a.m. (UTC+03:00)
- Location: Crimean Bridge; 45.24562°N 36.58829°E
- Perpetrator: Security Service of Ukraine
- Deaths: 2
- Injuries: 1

The 2023 Crimean Bridge explosion was an event during the Russo-Ukrainian war, on 17 July 2023, at approximately 3:04 a.m. and 3:20 a.m. EEST, when the Ukrainian Navy attacked the Crimean Bridge, with two suicide sea drones, damaging a span of the road bridge. The explosions killed two civilians and injured one. Ukraine later formally admitted to launching the attack.

== Incident ==
=== Explosion ===
Grey Zone, a pro-Wagner Group Telegram channel, said that explosions were heard at approximately 3:04 a.m. and 3:20 a.m. local time. Russian-installed governor of Crimea, Sergey Aksyonov, stated that an "emergency" occurred near the 145th support on the Russia side of the bridge.

=== Damage ===
The bridge was damaged. According to the BBC, the road surface was damaged, but the supports remained intact. FDD's Long War Journal says "two of the bridge's four lanes are totally unusable. The adjacent span for the other two lanes was knocked loose but remains on the pier."

A source close to Ukrainian intelligence services stated to Meduza that one of the pillars was damaged. The source said that the damaged pillar was the 145th pillar, on the Ukrainian side of the Ukraine–Russia international border.

Subsequent assessments revealed that the span had ruptured, with repairs estimating to last until November. Nevertheless, the bridge reopened to traffic the next day, albeit with only one lane open. The bridge was subsequently closed to both road and rail traffic only a few days later, following an attack on a Russian ammunition dump in Crimea on 22 July. The bridge was fully reopened on 14 October.

=== Casualties ===
Married couple Alexey and Natalia Kulik from Belgorod were killed, and their 14-year-old daughter Angelina was injured. On July 24, Angelina was discharged from the hospital.

== Responsibility ==
The attack was reportedly conducted by Ukrainian forces using Sea Baby marine drones and planned by the Security Service of Ukraine (SBU) and the Ukrainian Navy. Mykhailo Fedorov, Ukrainian Minister for Digital Transformation confirmed that naval drones had been used. SBU spokesman Artem Dekhtyarenko said that further information on the attack would be revealed at the end of the war. However, immediately after the attack, Ukrainian Army spokeswoman Natalia Humeniuk denied Ukrainian responsibility.

Russia's Anti-Terrorist Committee had opened a criminal investigation on the incident.

On 21 July, President Zelenskyy said at the Aspen Security Forum about the Crimean Bridge: “This is the route used to feed the war with ammunition and this is being done on a daily basis. And it militarizes the Crimean peninsula...For us, this is understandably an enemy facility built outside international laws and all applicable norms. So, understandably, this is a target for us. And a target that is bringing war, not peace, has to be neutralized.”

On 22 July, Ukrainian Defence Minister, Oleksii Reznikov acknowledged, in an interview with CNN, that the Crimea Bridge is a valid target. Asked whether Ukraine would seek to disable the bridge he replied: “It’s normal tactics to ruin the logistic lines of your enemy to stop the options to get more ammunition, to get more fuel, to get more food, etcetera. That’s why we will use these tactics against them.”

On 3 August, Ukraine formally admitted to launching the attack, with an official saying that it was proof that the country was more than capable of penetrating Russia's defences.

== Russia's reaction ==
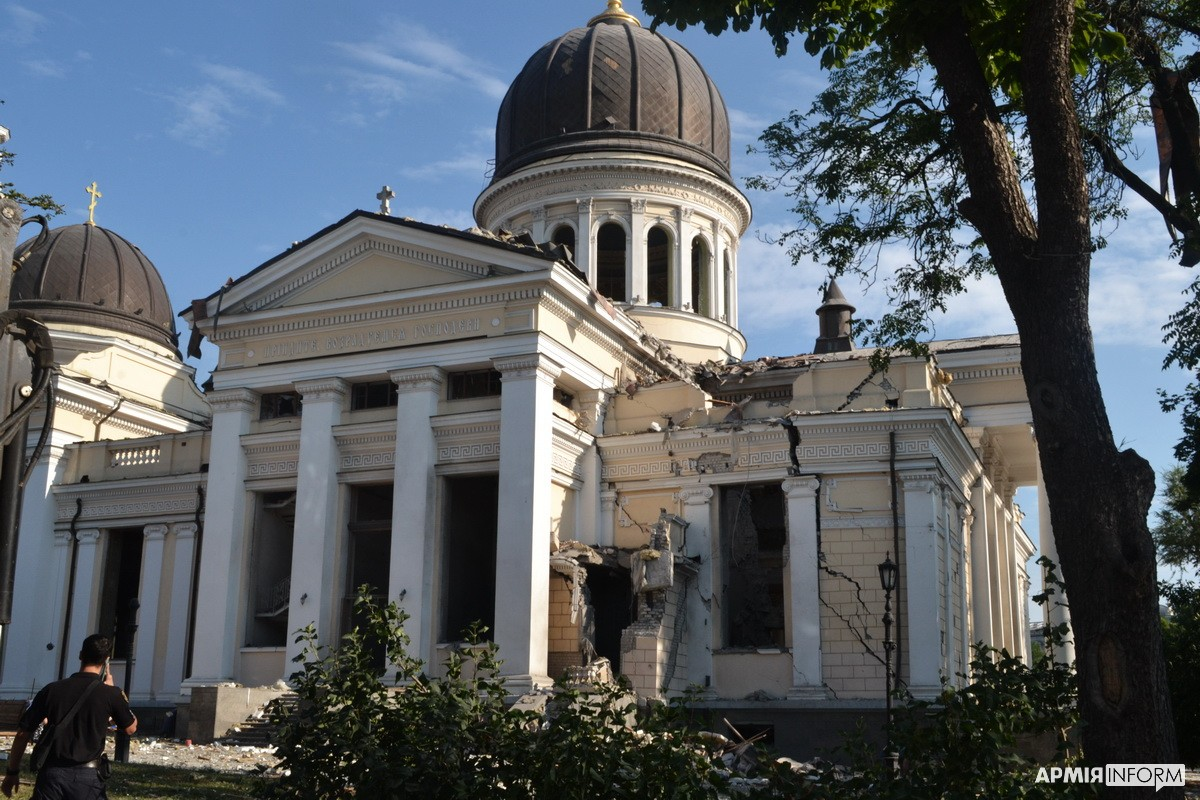
Transfiguration Cathedral in Odesa after airstrikes on the night of 23 July 2023

According to reports, emergency services arrived on the scene, including Minister of Transport Vitaly Savelyev and Deputy Chairman of the Council of Ministers of Crimea Igor Mikhailichenko, and a crisis centre was formed.

Later that day, Russian President Vladimir Putin withdrew from a deal that allowed Ukraine to export grain across the Black Sea despite a wartime blockade.

On the following day, 18 July, Russian forces hit southern Ukraine with airstrikes. Russia's Defense Ministry said that the strikes on Ukrainian port cities of Odesa and Mykolaiv were in retaliation for the Crimean Bridge explosion. Ukraine said that Russia was attacking civilian infrastructure linked to grain exports.

On 25 March 2024, Lt. Gen. Vasyl Maliuk, head of the SBU, said that Russia doesn't use the Kerch Bridge for munitions anymore due to repeated Ukrainian attacks. He said: “Before our successful strikes [on the bridge], daily traffic ranged from 42 to 46 trains carrying weapons and ammunition ... now there are only four to five per day. Four are passenger trains and one carries general goods.” He said that Ukraine still intends to destroy the bridge.

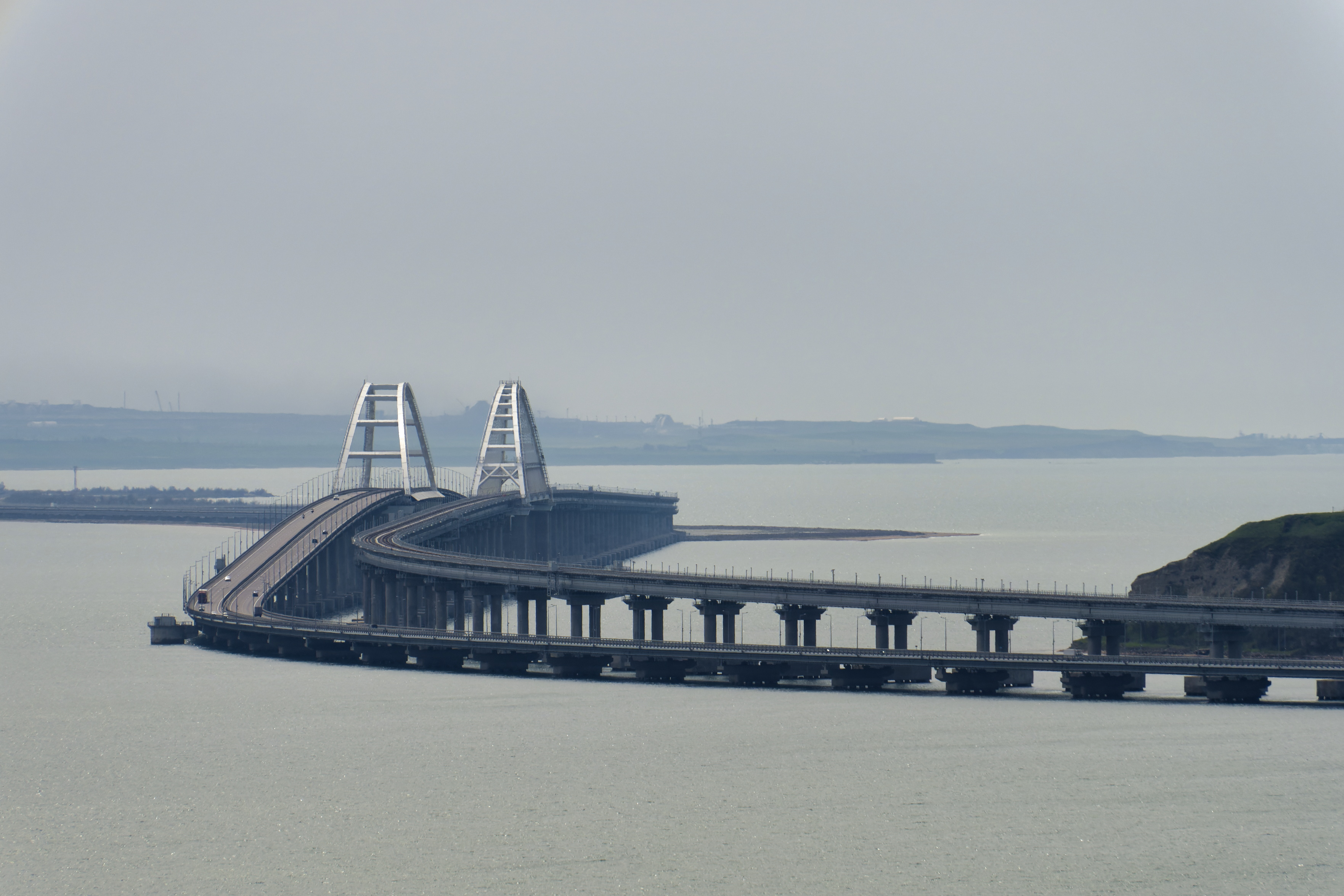
Crimean Bridge prior to the explosion.

== Other reactions ==
The UK Ministry of Defence believe the bridge has become a 'security burden' to Russia, tying down air defence systems and crews who would otherwise be deployed elsewhere.

== See also ==
- Bridges in the Russo-Ukrainian War
- Attacks in Russia during the Russian invasion of Ukraine
