= Chonhar Bridge =

Chonhar Bridge (roadway) Чонгарські мости
- Coordinates: 45°59′17″N 34°33′10″E
- Carries: M18 Highway
- Crosses: Chonhar Strait
- Locale: Dzhankoi Raion, AR Crimea, Ukraine

History
- Opened: Early 19th century

Location
- Interactive map of Chonhar Bridge (roadway)

Chonhar Bridge (railway) Чонгарські мости (Залізничний)
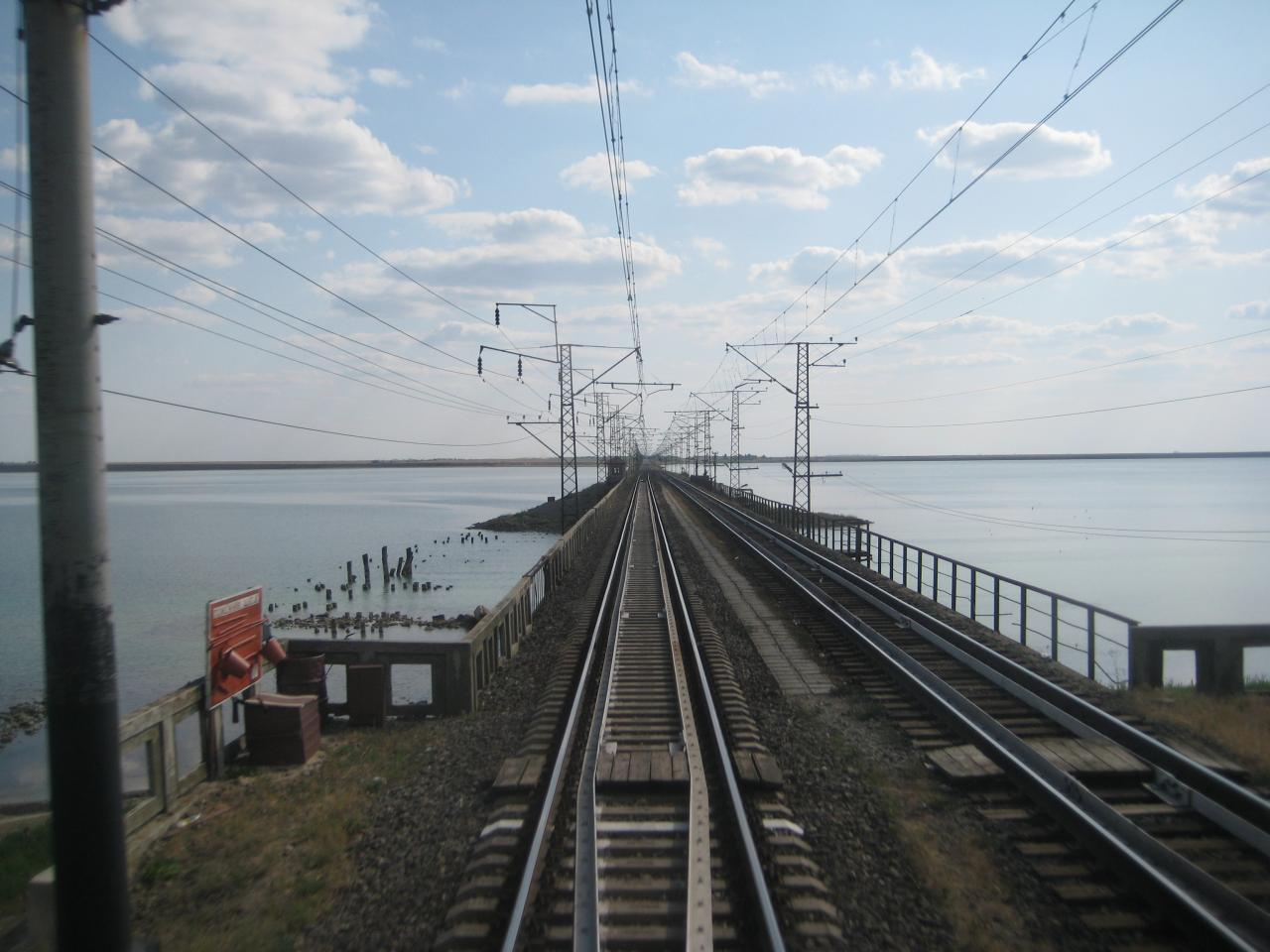
- Chonhar rail bridge and causeway viewed from the north
- Coordinates: 45.9524°N 34.4793°E
- Carries: Novooleksiivka–Dzhankoi rail line
- Crosses: Syvash lagoons
- Locale: Dzhankoi Raion, AR Crimea, Ukraine

Location
- Interactive map of Chonhar Bridge (railway)

Chonhar Bridge (Ukrainian: Чонгарські мости, romanized: Chonharski mosty), also transliterated from Russian as Chongar Bridge (Russian: Чонгарские мосты, romanized: Chongarskiye mosty), was a road bridge that crosses the Chonhar Strait and is part of the M18 Highway. There is also an older, now unused road bridge a few dozen meters away. There is also a rail bridge and causeway that traverses the Syvash a few kilometres to the west and is sometimes referred to as 'Chongar Bridge'.

== History ==
A bridge was constructed probably in the early 19th century, as it was marked on a 1836 map, becoming a second land route to Crimea, in addition to the Perekop Isthmus.

During the Crimean War in the 1850s, the Chonhar Bridge became immensely important to the defending Russians, and provided a crucial passage for supplies to the military. One of the teams under Russian general Dmitry Lobanov-Rostovsky successfully defended the bridge against enemy attacks.

During the Crimean Operation in Ukrainian-Soviet War in 1918, the Ukrainian military attacked the Chonhar Bridge.

In 2014, in response to the Russian annexation of Crimea, the Ukrainian government placed mines on the Ukrainian end of several bridges connecting mainland Ukraine to Crimea, including the Chonhar Bridge.

=== Russo-Ukrainian war ===
On April 25, 2022, during the Russo-Ukrainian war, the General Staff of the Ukrainian Armed Forces announced that the Chonhar Bridge has been mined, and that the Ukrainians are at a 1-to-15 disadvantage against the Russian advance. There were later claims that the bridge has been demined, which the General Staff denied.

On August 10, a fire broke out near the southern end of the bridge, and was caused by an explosion in nearby Chonhar.

On June 22, 2023 at about 5pm, there were reports of the Ukrainian military conducting counteroffensive operations in the region. According to investigations of the remnants of the bridge and nearby areas, it was likely that the Ukrainian military struck the bridge with British-supplied Storm Shadow missiles. This attack was confirmed by a representative of the General Staff about two weeks after.

Since this is one of only a few land connections between mainland occupied Ukraine, the destruction of these bridges posed a major challenge for Russian logistics in the war.

In the morning of July 29, the Ukrainian military successfully attacked Russian positions near the bridge, and once again disrupted their logistics, especially of weaponry and foodstuffs. These reports were quickly confirmed by the Strategic command of the Ukrainian Armed Forces.

On August 6, the Ukrainian Air Force used Su-24 fighter jets to fire Storm Shadow missiles towards the Chonhar and the (new) Henichesk Bridge, leading to damage of both bridges. On 15 August the bridge was reopened after repairs.

The bridge was damaged by Ukrainian strikes on June 7, 2026, and partially destroyed on June 9. On June 11, a temporary pontoon was built. Further strikes caused the bridge to collapse in late September.

== Description ==
The current bridge traverses the Chonhar Strait, connecting the Chonhar peninsula in the mainland with the Tiup-Dzhankoi peninsula in Crimea. This strait has two new road bridges (New Chonhar Bridge and Kherson Bridge), located on M18 Highway. The old Chonhar bridge is located south of this bridge, and is in a state of disrepair.

On both coasts of the Chonhar Bridge, the area is filled with defence positions and installations from the Soviet-German War. In 2014, following the Russian annexation of Crimea, the military on both sides constructed new defences. Prior to the Russian invasion in 2022, the Ukrainians operated a checkpoint on the Ukrainian end of the Chonhar Bridge, and the Russians operated one on their end of the Kherson Bridge.

== Rail bridge ==
A rail bridge and causeway traverses the Syvash a few kilometres west of the road bridge at Syvash village (also on Choghar Peninsula). Part of the Novooleksiivka–Dzhankoi rail line, it is sometimes also referred to as Chongar Bridge. It is double-tracked on a long causeway running from the south side and a comparatively short bridge spanning the channel at the northern end.

Since December 27, 2014, the Ukrainian government ordered the suspension of rail connection on the bridge due to Russian annexation. The contact network was subsequently dismantled, and then covered with barbed wire to prevent Russian use.
