= Henichesk Bridge =

Henichesk Bridge Генічеський залізний міст
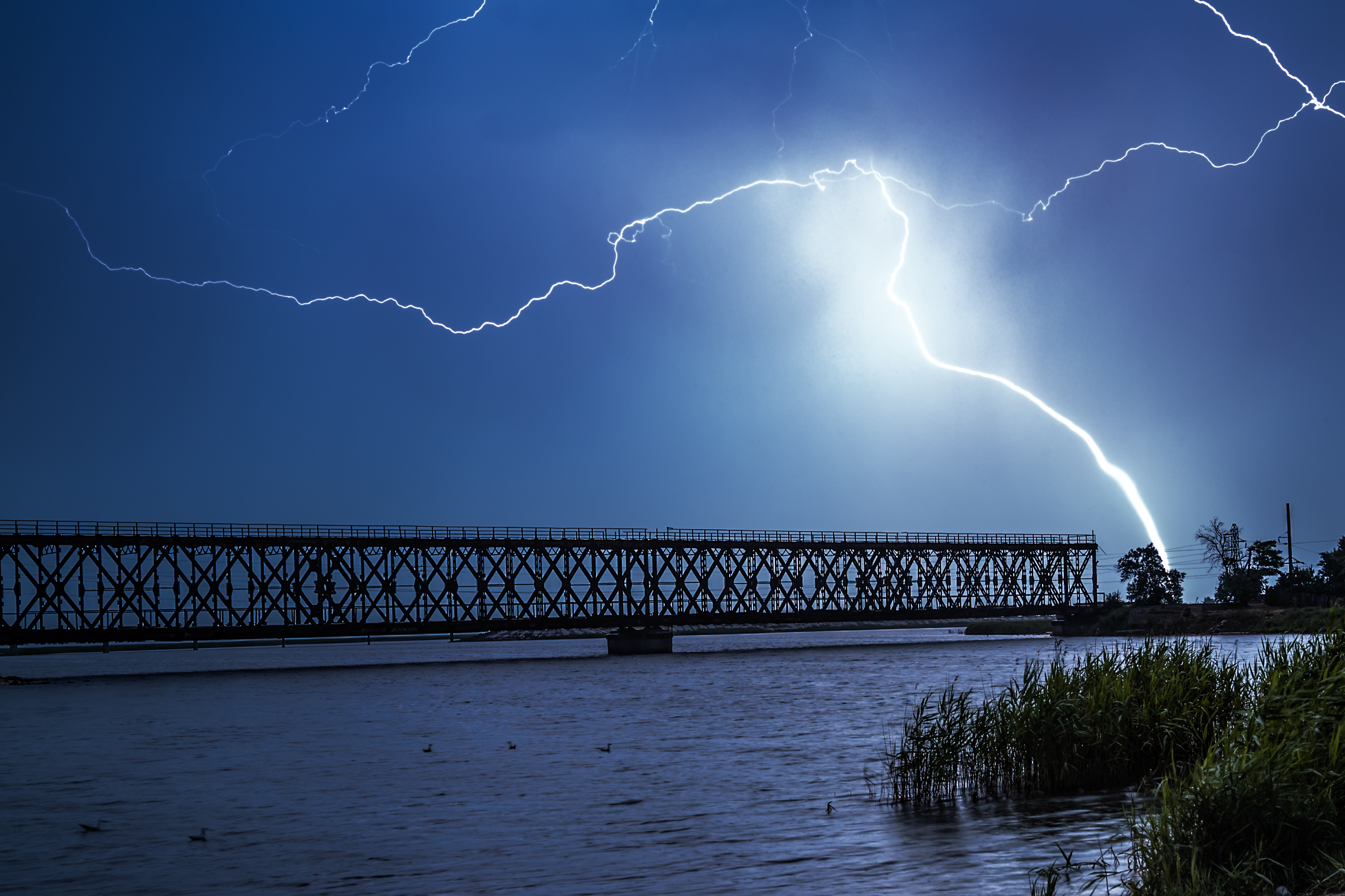
- Henichesk Bridge over the Azov Sea during a storm
- Coordinates: 46.162961°N 34.798462°E
- Crosses: Henichesk Strait
- Locale: Henichesk Raion, Kherson Oblast, Ukraine

History
- Construction start: 1915
- Opened: December 1951

Location
- Interactive map of Henichesk Bridge

Henichesk Bridge (Ukrainian: Генічеський залізний міст, romanized: Heniches'kyj zaliznyj mist) is a rail and road bridge located in southern Ukraine. It was designed by Waagner-Biro and built in 1915. The bridge is an icon of the European architecture style that this group utilizes.

== Location ==
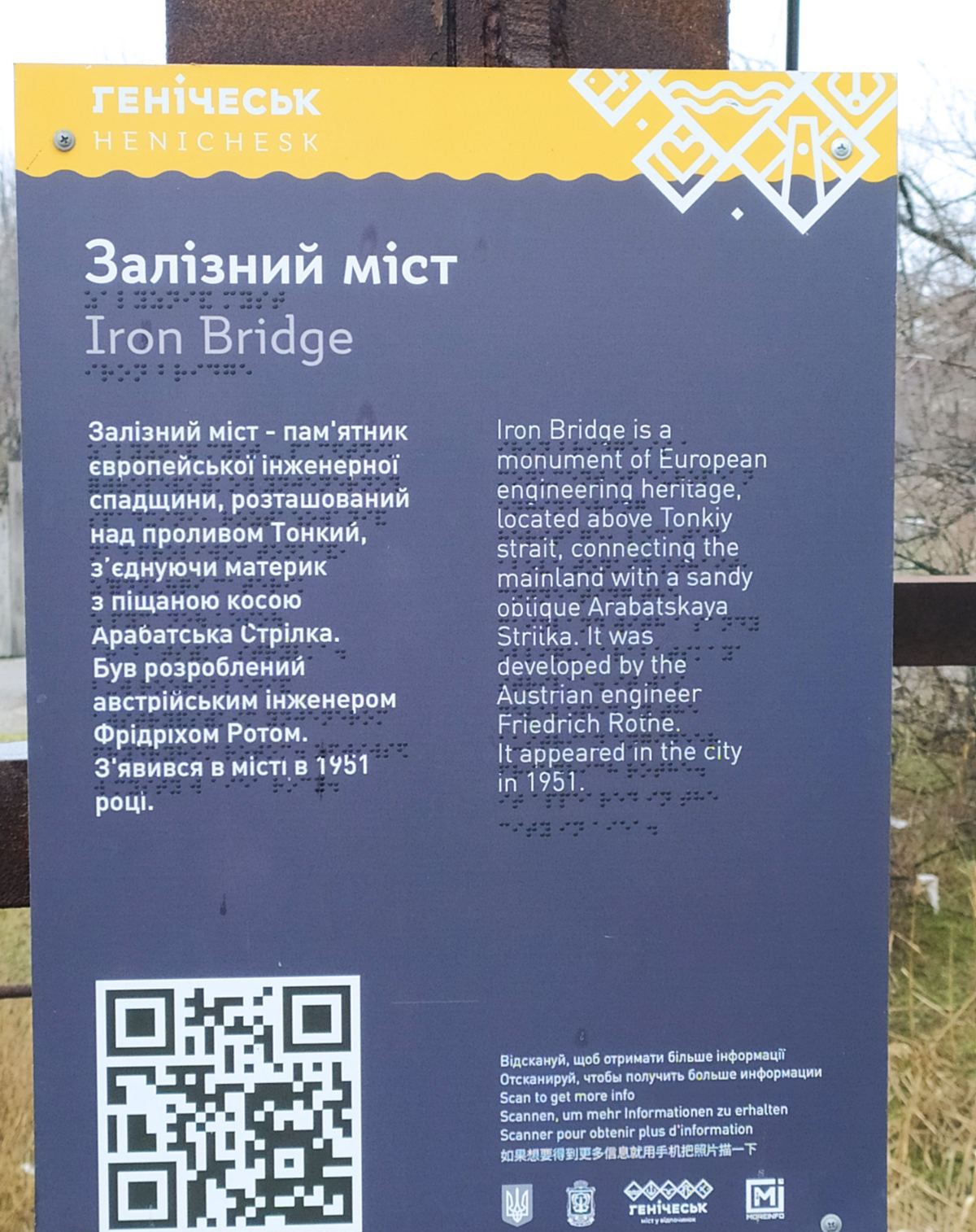
Introduction board at the entrance of the Henichesk Bridge

This bridge is located in the Henichesk Raion of Kherson Oblast, and traverses the Henichesk Strait. This bridge connects the Arabat Spit with the European mainland, and is therefore a strategically significant point.

== History ==
The Henichesk Bridge was built in 1915 by Waagner-Biro. In 1951, German engineers transported this bridge from the Belarusian city of Orsha towards Henichesk. This bridge replaced a wooden bridge at a similar location, which was destroyed during the Second World War.

According to a report from the Henichesk Local History Museum in 1956, this bridge was built from "overhead structures, trophy collapsible overhead structures of the Rot-Wagner (RV-1) type, removed from the temporary bridge across the Dnieper from Orsha. At the end of December 1951, regular train traffic was opened on the bridge".

Until 1968, this bridge was used as a rail bridge, and was part of the Novooleksiivka-Valok line.

Since this region is prone to thunderstorms, the rails on the bridge came to be effectively destroyed over the years. Instead of replacing new rails, this bridge was then used for road traffic instead. In the 1980s, another concrete bridge was erected about half a kilometer away. Since then, this bridge has been mainly used for sightseeing and fishing instead of transportation.

On February 24, 2022, at the onset of the Russian invasion of Ukraine, a member of the Ukrainian military, Vitalii Skakun, blew up one of the bridges at Henichesk to stall the Russian advance, and sacrificed his own life in the process (some sources say he blew the Henichesk Bridge, some say the road bridge). Two days later, Ukrainian president Volodymyr Zelenskyy posthumously awarded him the Hero of Ukraine.

The newer bridge is used as a supply route for Russian forces during the Russo-Ukraine war. According to the Ukrainian military, Ukrainian drones struck this bridge on June 20, 2026.

== Construction ==
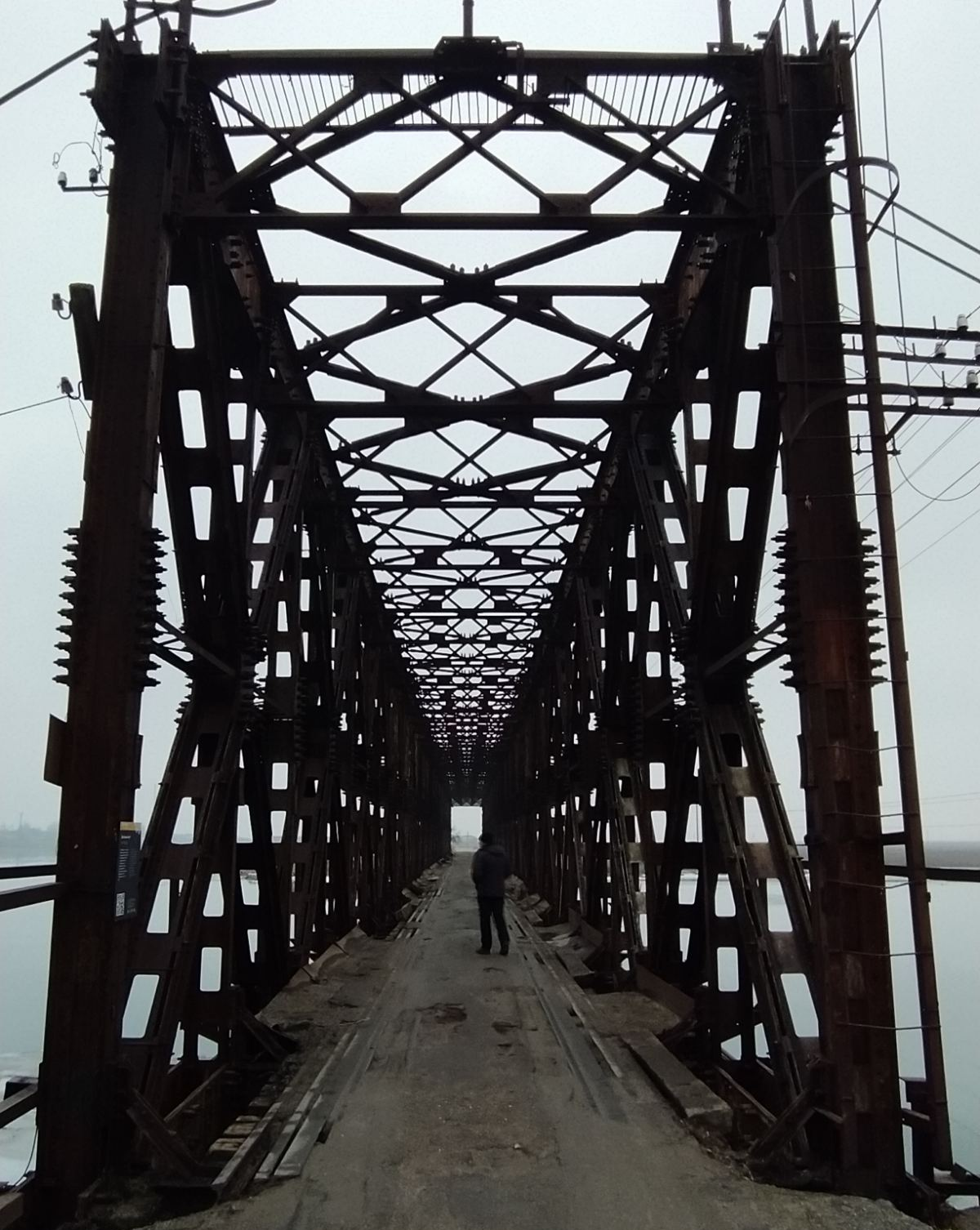
Inside the Henichesk Bridge

Henichesk Bridge utilizes the "Waagner Roth" system, developed by the Austro-Hungarian company of the same name during the First World War. During the war, the construction of a prefabricated railway bridge, which would have the least amount of assembly equipment and time needed, was developed by a young Austrian engineer, Friedrich Roth (1878-1940). This system was originally used to quickly replace destroyed bridges, including rail bridges, which was an important capability in wartime. This method allowed for the construction of up to 26 meters a day, but was relatively expensive.

The bridge structure was assembled from small typical elements in a hanging position with a cantilever length of up to 50 meters. At the same time, additional supports were not required. A crane-like lifting device was located at the top of the bridge. It moved as the object lengthened, thus the bridge built itself. The iron bridge structure was built without a single welding seam. The structural elements are connected solely with nuts and bolts.
