= Syvash, Kherson Oblast =

Rural locality in Kherson Oblast, Ukraine

Syvash Сиваш
- Village
- Interactive map of Syvash
- Location within Crimea Location within Kherson Oblast Location within Ukraine
- Coordinates: 45°58′5″N 34°29′17″E
- Country: Ukraine
- Oblast: Kherson Oblast
- Raion: Henichesk Raion

Population (2004)
  - Total: 257

Syvash (Ukrainian: Сиваш) is a village at the southernmost point of the Chonhar Peninsula on the northern coast of the Syvash sea in the Henichesk Raion of Kherson Oblast, Ukraine. It has a population of 257. It belongs to Henichesk urban hromada, one of the hromadas of Ukraine. The Novooleksiivka–Dzhankoi railway line runs over a bridge and embankment across the sea near the village.

== History ==
The village was founded in 1874 at the railway station of the same name, Syvash, that linked the village to Crimea. The railway station was laid as part of the Lozovo-Sevastopol railway. During the Great Patriotic War, the village was occupied by German troops from 15 September 1941 to 30 October 1943.

In the present day, the village is home to the Scientific and Innovative Complex "Ecology", which produces fertilizers and nitrogen compounds, Dzhankoysko-Sivash Research and Experimental Plant for the production of pharmaceuticals, the Agricultural Small Enterprise "Halobiont" for the production of food, and Research and Experimental Enterprise for the production of carotene.

Syvash was captured by Russian ground forces on the first day of the Russian Invasion of Ukraine phase of the Russo-Ukrainian War when they crossed the nearby border of the de facto Republic of Crimea.

== Demographics ==
According to the 2001 Ukrainian Census, the only official census taken in post-independence Ukraine, the population of the village was 257 people. Of the people residing in the village, their mother tongue is as follows:

Language	Percentage of Population
Ukrainian	60.31%
Russian	35.41%
Other/Unspecified	4.28%

== Politics ==
During the 2014 Ukrainian parliamentary election, 160 of the villagers voted in the election, a turnout of 26.25%. Of those that voted, 19.08% voted for Strong Ukraine and 14.28% was won each by the Liberal Party of Ukraine and Spade.
