= Henichesk Strait =

Body of water in Ukraine

Coordinates: 46°9′36.97″N 34°47′33.72″E

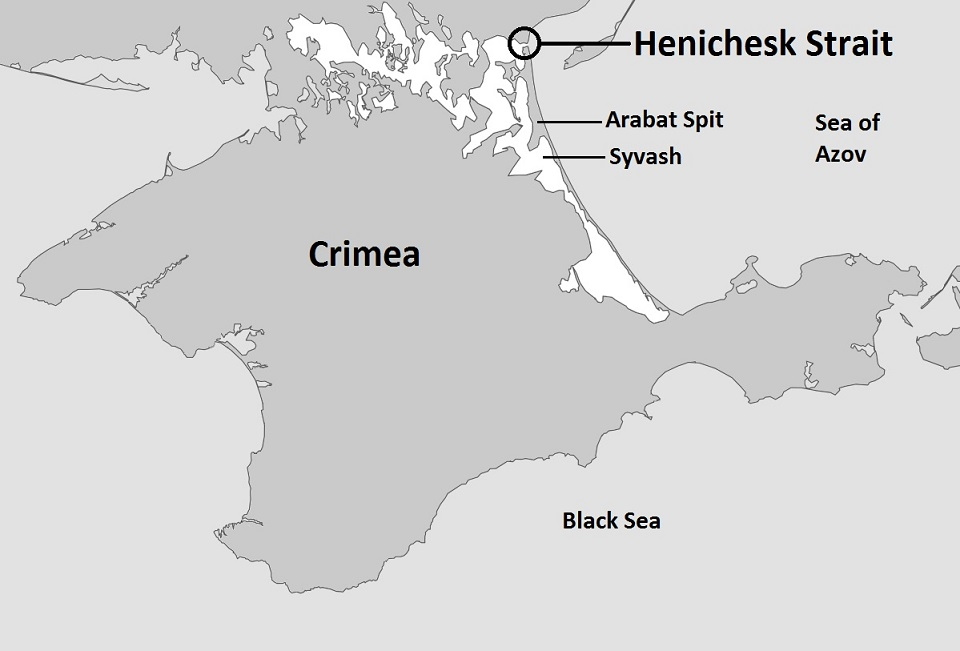

The Henichesk Strait (Note: Ukrainian: Генічеська протока, romanized: Heničeśka protoka; Crimean Tatar: Геническ, romanized: Geniçesk; Russian: Генический пролив, romanized: Geničeskij proliv) is a narrow strait which connects the Syvash (the shallow lagoon system separating the Crimea from the rest of Ukraine east of the Isthmus of Perekop) with the Sea of Azov. It separates the Arabat Spit from the Ukrainian mainland.

== Overview ==
The strait is about 4 kilometres (2.5 mi) long and the width varies from 80 to 150 metres (260 to 490 ft), with a depth of 4.6 metres (15 ft). On account of its narrowness, it is also sometimes called Thin Strait (Russian: Тонкий пролив, Ukrainian: Тонка протока). The direction of flow depends on the wind. On the north side of the strait is the town and port of Henichesk in Ukraine.

Although the strait separates the Crimea from the Ukrainian mainland geographically, it does not do so politically: both sides of the strait are in the Kherson Oblast, and the political boundary between Kherson Oblast and the Autonomous Republic of Crimea lies further south on the Arabat Spit.

The strait is crossed at Henichesk by the road/rail Henichesk Bridge (now disused for transportation), and a road bridge built in the 1980s.

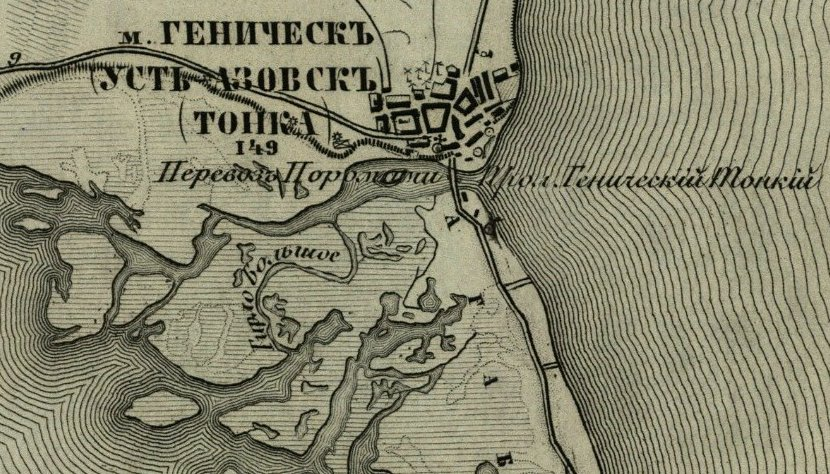
Nineteenth century map of the Henichesk Strait
