= Syvash =

Bay of the Sea of Azov

- Map of Crimea, showing the Syvash in violet

- Location within Crimea Location within Kherson Oblast Location within Ukraine
- Location: Sea of Azov
- Coordinates: 46°05′N 34°20′E
- River sources: Salgir
- Basin countries: Ukraine; Russia (de facto)
- Max. length: 200 km (120 mi)
- Max. width: 35 km (22 mi)
- Surface area: 2,560 km^{2} (990 sq mi)
- Average depth: 0.5–1 m (1.6–3.3 ft)
- Max. depth: 3 m (9.8 ft)
- Salinity: 22-87‰

Ramsar Wetland
- Official name: Central Syvash
- Designated: 11 October 1976
- Reference no.: 115

Ramsar Wetland
- Official name: Eastern Syvash
- Designated: 23 November 1995
- Reference no.: 769

The Syvash or Sivash (Ukrainian and Russian: Сиваш; Crimean Tatar: Sıvaş, Сываш, lit. 'dirt'), also known as the Putrid Sea or Rotten Sea (Russian: Гнилое Море, romanized: Gniloye More; Ukrainian: Гниле Море, romanized: Hnyle More; Crimean Tatar: Çürük Deñiz), is a large area of shallow lagoons on the western edge of the Sea of Azov. Separated from the sea by the narrow Arabat Spit, the water of the Syvash covers an area of around 2,560 km^{2} (990 sq mi) and the entire area spreads over about 10,000 km^{2} (3,900 sq mi). The Henichesk Strait is its eastern connection to the Sea of Azov. The Syvash borders the northeastern coast of the main Crimean Peninsula. The central and eastern Syvash were registered as wetlands of Ukraine under the Ramsar Convention. Since the 2022 Russian invasion of Ukraine, the entire Syvash has been occupied by Russia.

== Overview ==
The Syvash nearly cuts the Crimean Peninsula off from the mainland, serving as a natural border between the Kherson region and the Autonomous Republic of Crimea. The long (110 km; 68 mi) and narrow (0.27–8 km; 0.2–5.0 mi) Arabat Spit runs to its east, separating it from the Sea of Azov. The two bodies are connected in the north at the Henichesk Strait beside the port of Henichesk. To its west, the Isthmus of Perekop separates it from the Black Sea and connects Crimea to the mainland.

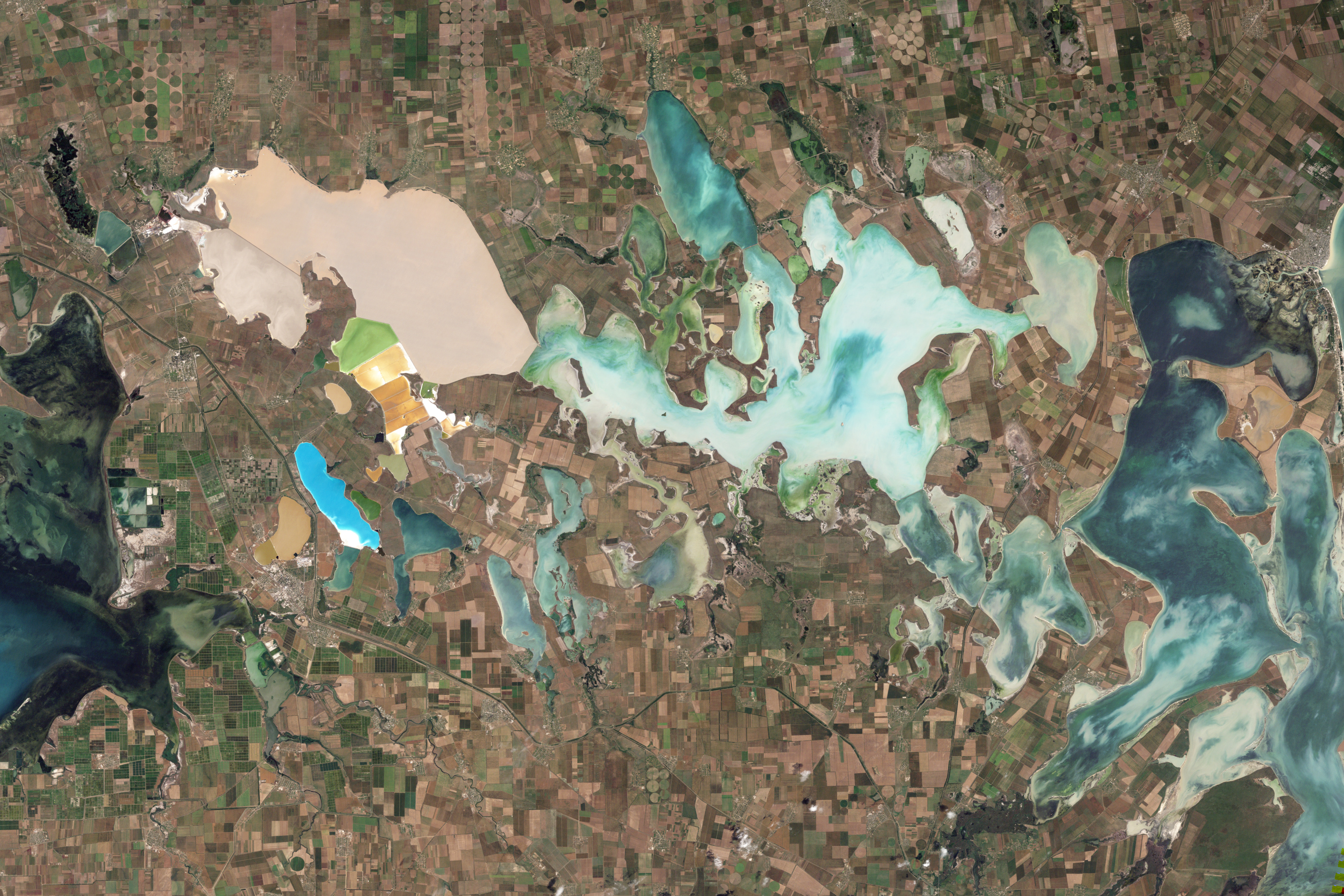
Natural-colour satellite image of the Syvash

The Syvash is extremely shallow. The deepest place is about 3 meters (10 ft), with most areas between 1/2–1 m (1 ft 8 in – 3 ft 3 in) deep. The bottom is covered with silt up to 5 m (16 ft) thick. Being very shallow, the waters in the Syvash heat up in the summer and produce a putrid smell. The wide area for evaporation also leaves the water extremely salty. The amount of various salts is estimated at 200 million metric tons. Several industrial plants harvest the mineral resources of Syvash. The Syvash area is a wetland of international importance. The shores are low, slightly sloping, swampy and salty. In summer, the water level of Syvash decreases significantly, revealing barren solonets soils called "syvashes" by locals.

The Syvash is sometimes divided into the Western Syvash and Eastern Syvash. These are connected to each other by the Chongar Strait.

== History ==
During the Russian Civil War, the Syvash became famous for a surprise crossing by the Red Army during the Perekop-Chongar Operation in November 1920.

== Flora ==
The Syvash may appear red in color due to the salt-tolerant micro-alga Dunaliella salina.

The eastern parts of the Syvash contain less salt and are home to reeds and other wetland vegetation.

The large islands in the Central Syvash are mainly covered with steppes consisting of feather grass, tulips, tauric wormwood (Artemisia taurica), sage, crested wheat grass, and fescue.

The shores of the Syvash contain a large number of salt-tolerant vegetation, including glasswort, Tripolium, plantains, sea lavender (Limonium caspium), and saltbush (Atriplex aucheri).

== Gallery ==
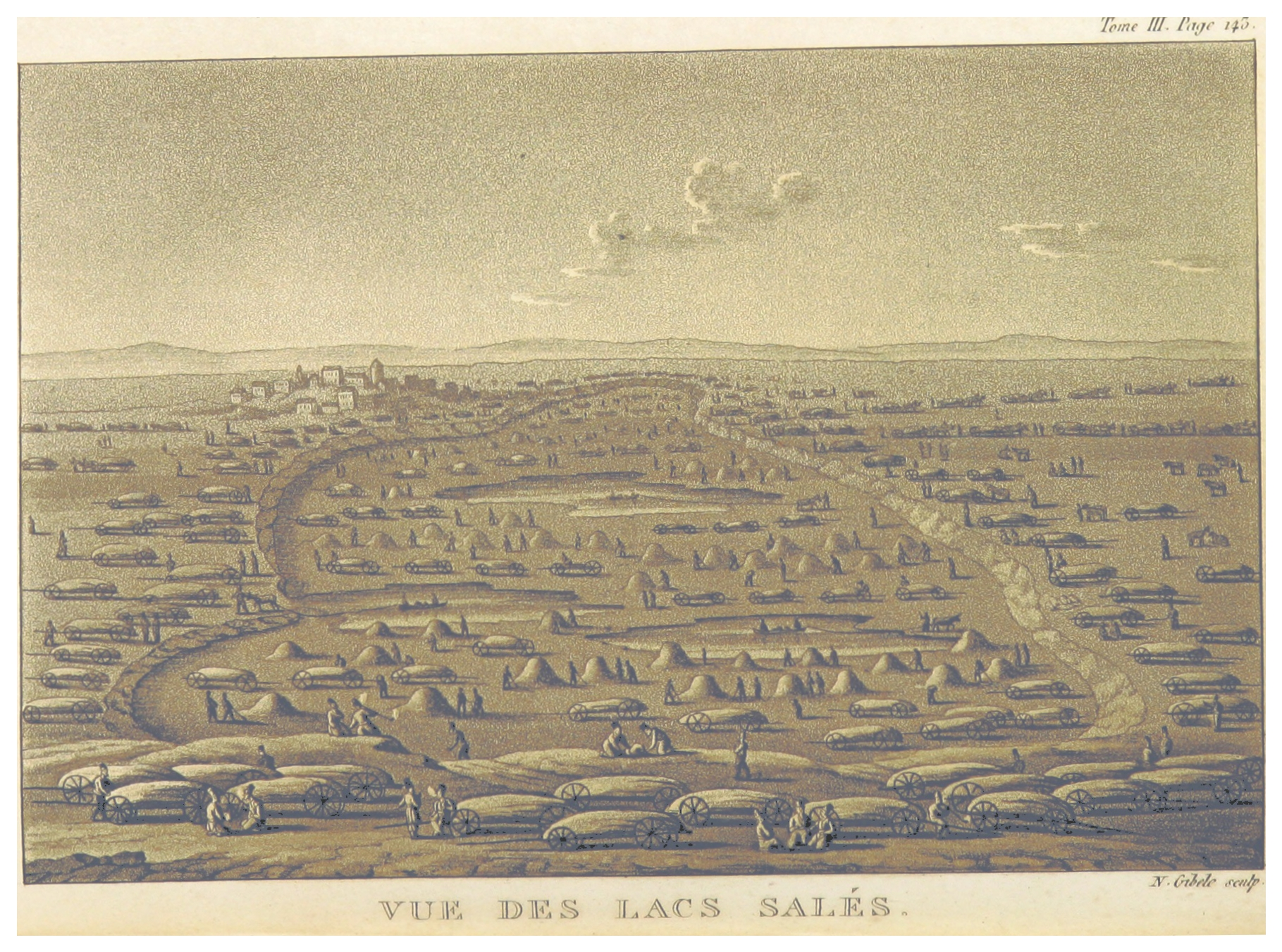
The Salinas (c. 1820)

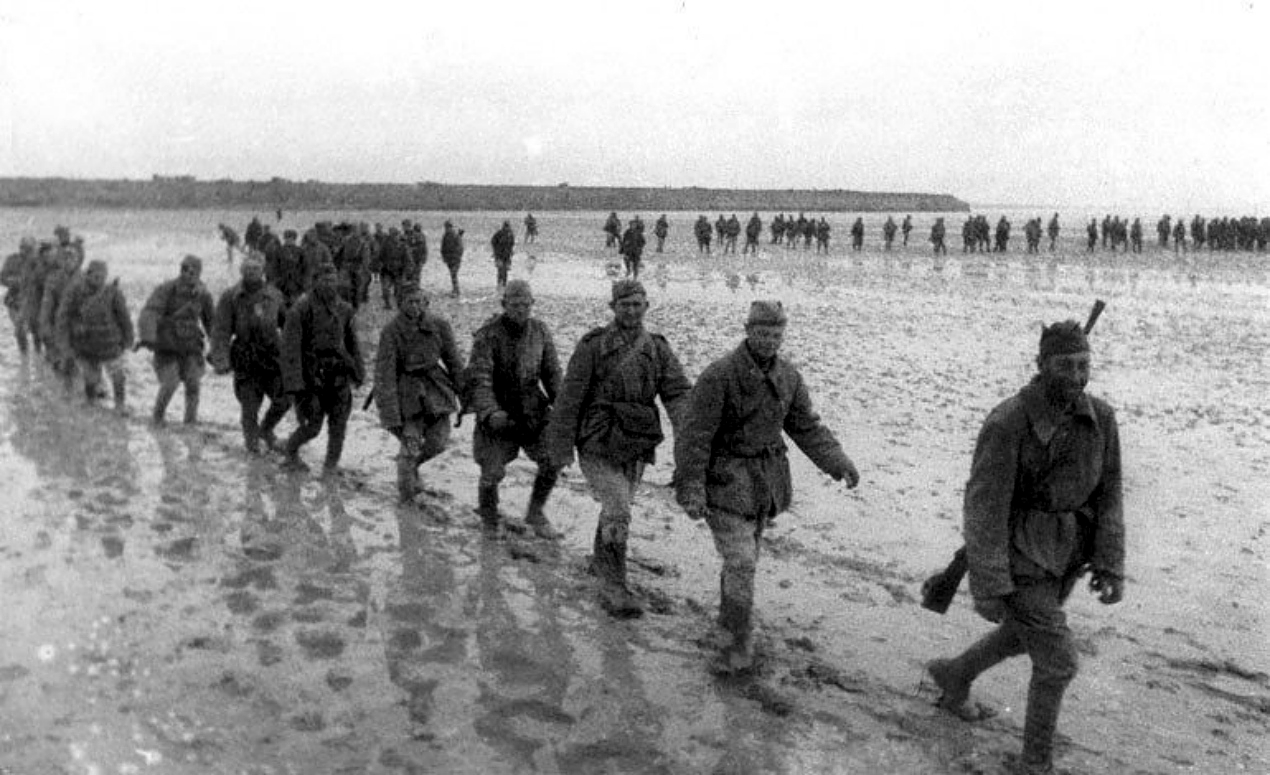
Soviet soldiers crossing the Syvash in late 1943

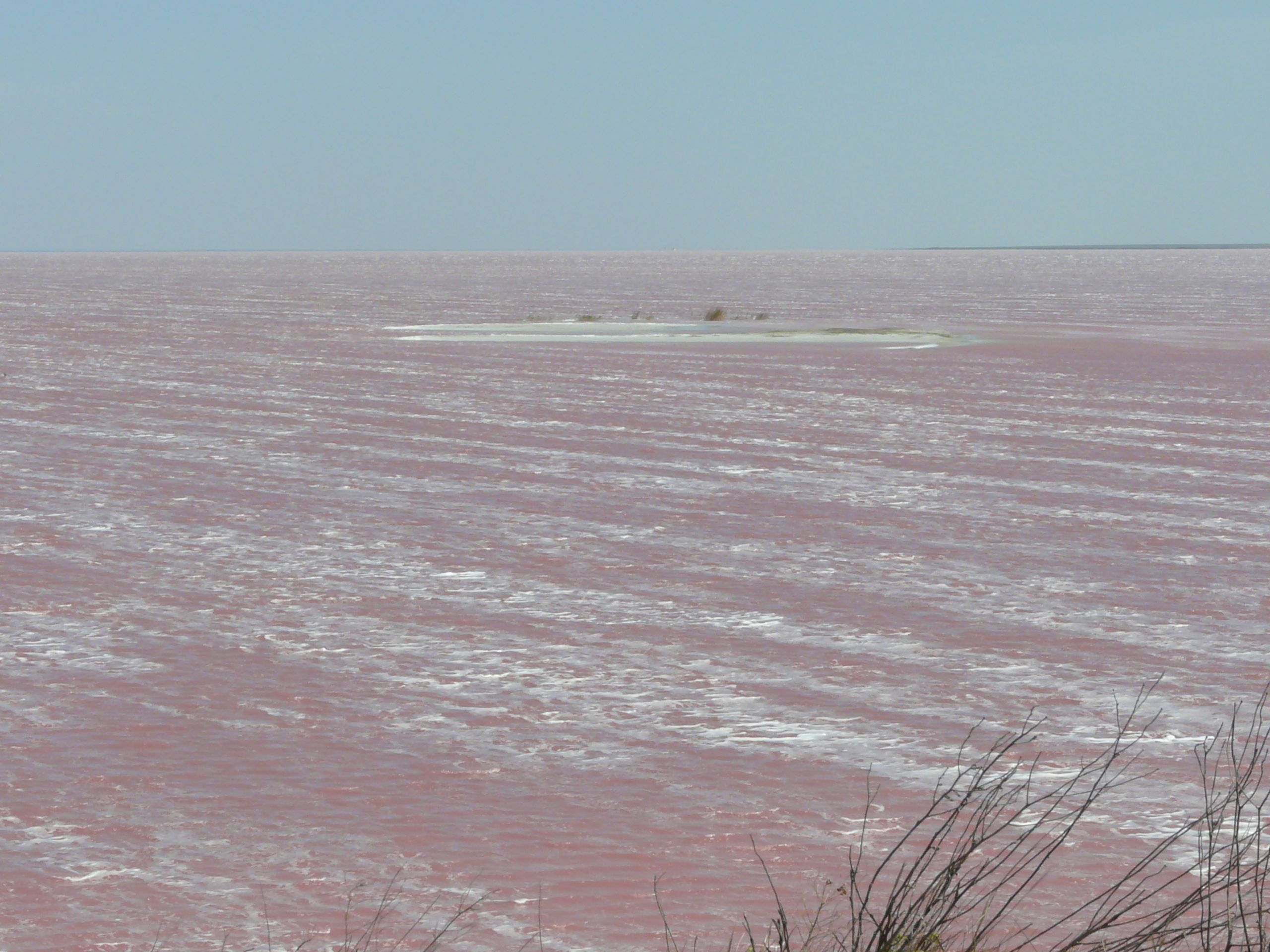
Syvash waters turned reddish by Dunaliella salina microalgae

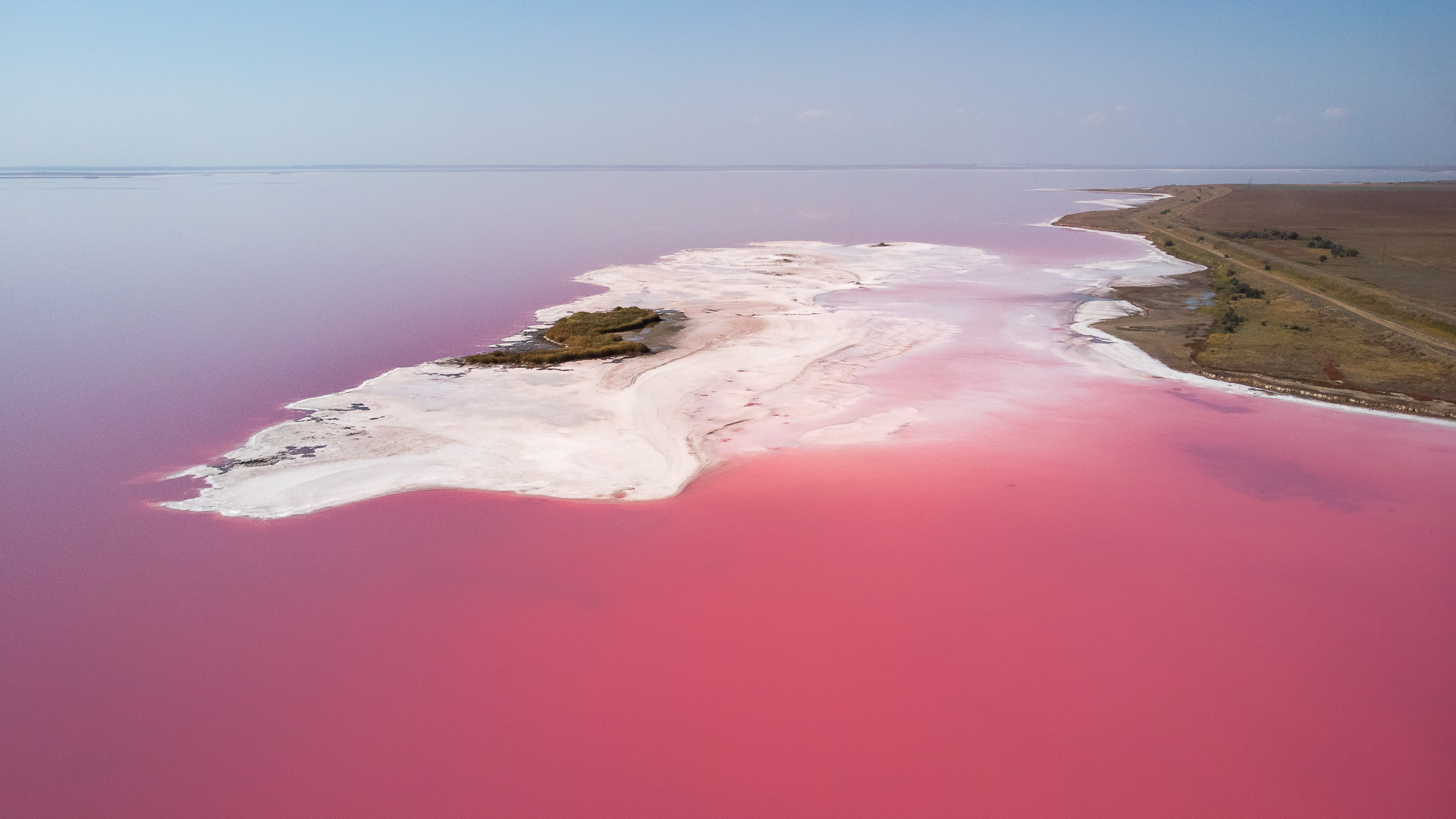
View of Lake Lemuria, one of the bodies of water tinted by algae

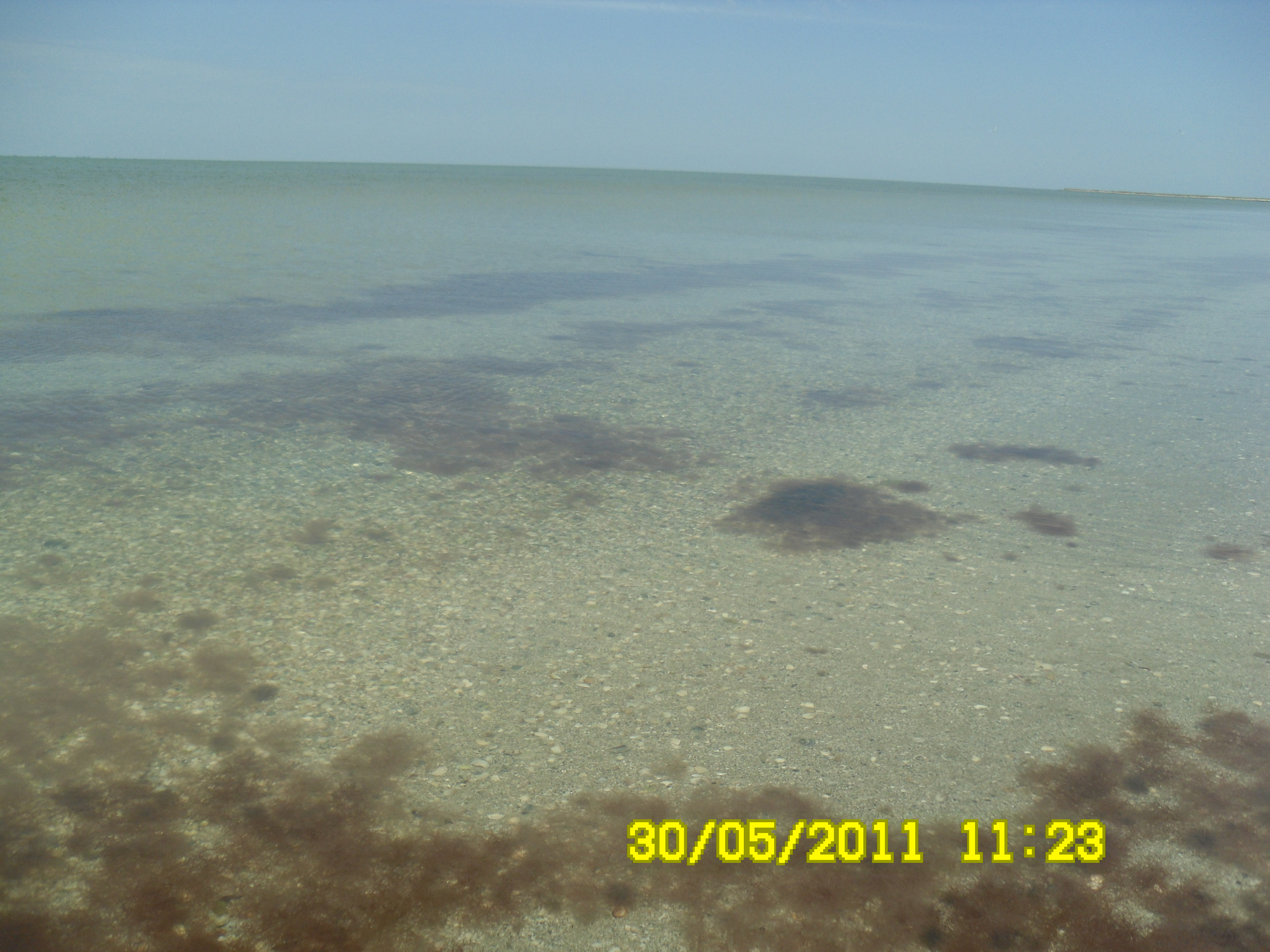
The shallow waters near Nyzhnohirskyy
