= List of unmanned aerial vehicles =

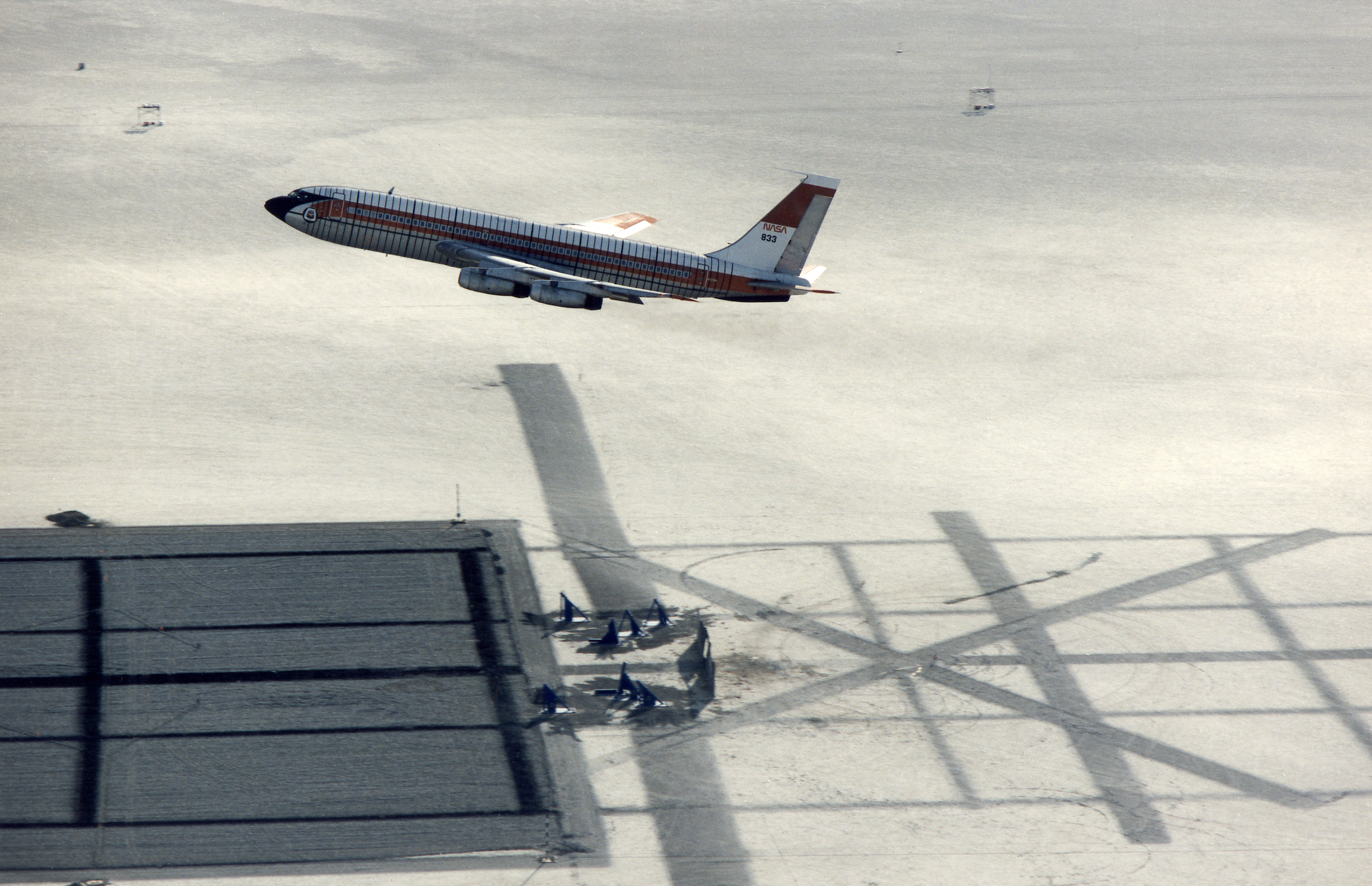
A Boeing 720 being flown under remote control as part of NASA's Controlled Impact Demonstration.

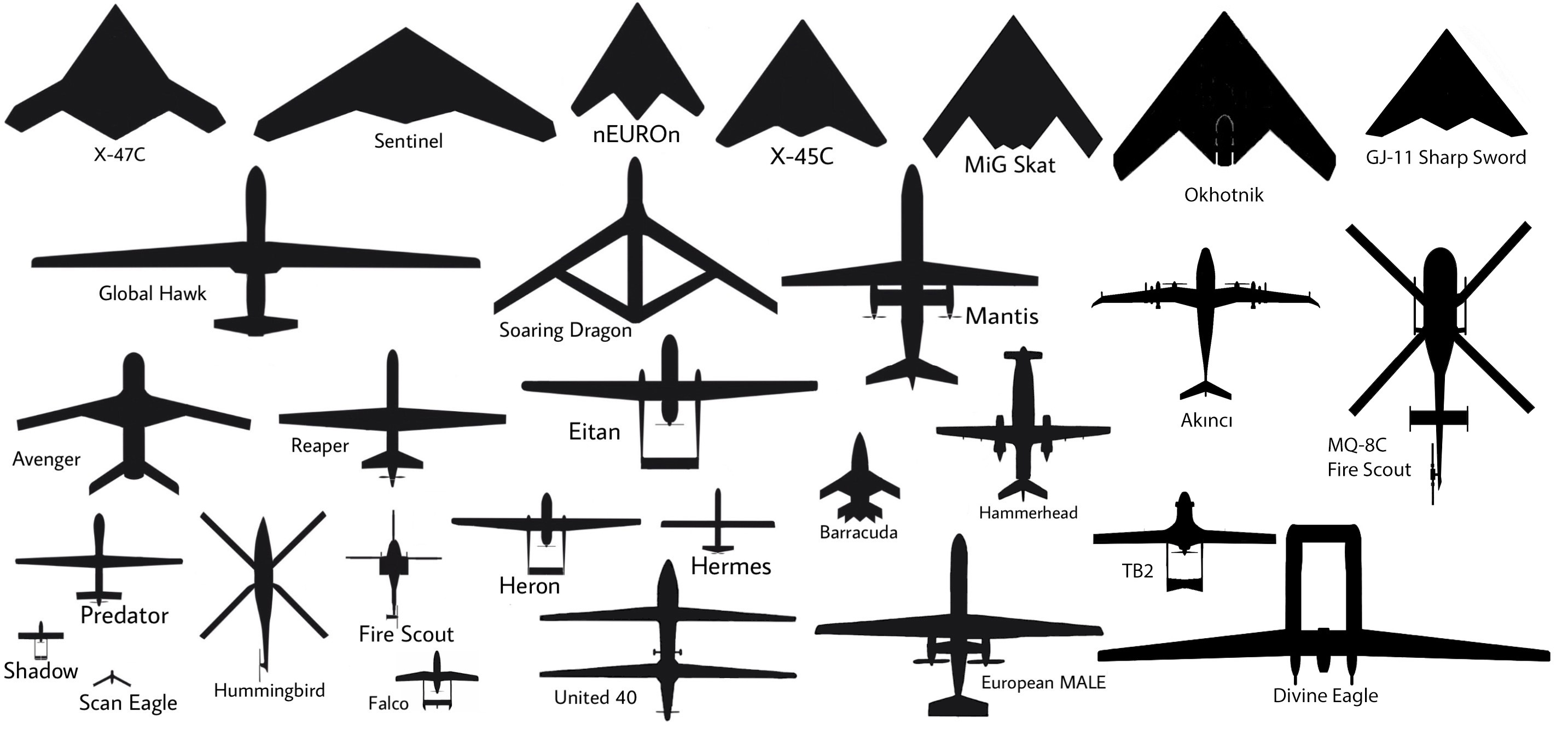
Comparison of many UAV.

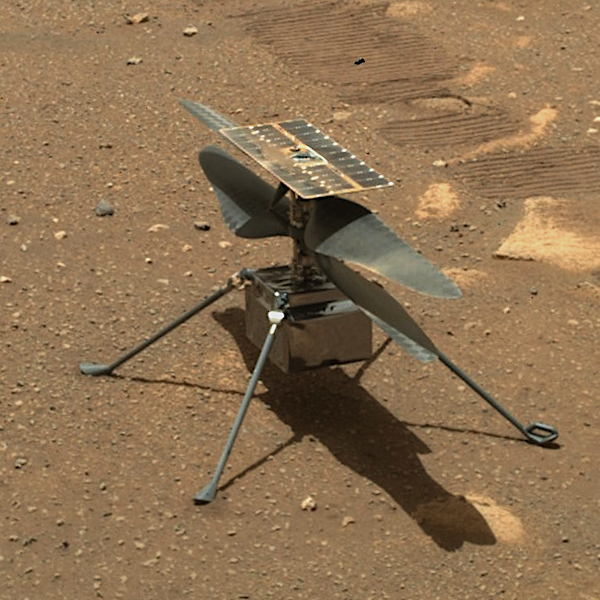
Ingenuity helicopter, first Mars Helicopter on sol 46 after being deployed on martian surface by Mars 2020 perseverance rover

The following is a list of unmanned aerial vehicles developed and operated in various countries around the world.

== Algeria ==
- AL fajer L-10
- Amel (UAV)

== Argentina ==
- AeroDreams Chi-7 (AeroDreams)
- AeroDreams Strix Reconnaissance (2006)
- AeroVision Arcangel (AeroVision) - agricultural and civilian surveillance (2010)
- FMA IA X 59 Dronner (FAdeA) - reconnaissance (1972)
- Lipán M3 "Apache" - reconnaissance (2007)
- Lipán XM4 - reconnaissance (development)
- ARA Guardian (UAV) - reconnaissance (2007)
- Nostromo Caburé (Nostromo Defensa)
- Nostromo Centinela
- Nostromo Yarará
- Nostromo Yagua
- Quimar MQ-2 "Bigua"

== Armenia ==
- Krunk UAV
- X-55 (UAV)

== Australia ==
- AAI Corporation Aerosonde - weather data
- AAI Corporation Aerosonde Mk.1
- AAI Corporation Aerosonde Mk.2
- AAI Corporation Aerosonde Mk.3
- AAI Corporation Aerosonde Mk.4
- Aerosonde Aeroguard
- ADRO Pelican Observer
- BAE Brumby
- BAE Kingfisher
- BAE STRIX
- Boeing Air Power Teaming System (Boeing MQ-28 Ghost Bat)
- Carbonix Volanti
- Carbonix Domani
- Coptercam
- Cyber Technology CyberQuad
- Cyber Technology CyberEye
- Cyber Technology CyBird
- Cyber Technology CyberWraith
- Codarra Avatar
- CSIRO Mantis
- GAF Jindivik
- GAF Turana
- Entecho Demipod
- Entecho Mupod
- ADI Jandu
- Silvertone Flamingo
- Skyborne Technologies Cerberus GLH
- Skyborne Technologies Gannet Glide Drone (GGD)
- Sonacom Mirli
- UAV Vision G18 Aeolus
- UAV Vision T21
- UAV Vision T26
- AVT Hammerhead
- V-TOL i-copter Phantom
- V-TOL i-copter Seeker
- V-TOL Mini Warrigal
- V-TOL Warrigal Explorer
- V-TOL Explore
- V-TOL Arrow
- V-TOL Quadrotor
- V-TOL Octocopter

== Austria ==
- Schiebel Camcopter S-100 - multi-role
- Schiebel Camcopter S-300 - multi-role, heavy lift
- Diamond Hero

== Azerbaijan ==
- AZAD (AZAD Systems Co)
- Orbiter-2M

== Belarus ==
- aOrion Helicopter E
- Grif-1
- INDELA-I.N.SKY
- Berkut
- Yastreb
- Sterkh-BM

== Belgium ==
- MBLE Épervier (1969)
- B-Hunter UAV (2002)
- Gatewing X-100 UAV (2010) - surveying and mapping applications^

== Brazil ==
- 14-X, a Mach 10 UAV scramjet under development by FAB
- A-20 LTA VANT Commercial UAV of Space Airships.
- Acauã VANT Experimental UAV of the Brazilian Air Force to develop electronic systems for future Brazilian UAVS.
- Aeromot K1AM UAV/Target drone for the Brazilian Navy, based in Northrop KD2R-5 Drone.
- AGPlane UAV of AGX/Aeroalcool.Agricultural and civilian surveillance UAV.
- Arara M1 Small surveillance UAV.
- Arara T1 Small UAV/target of AGX/Aeroalcool for the Brazilian Navy.
- Avibras Falcão Tactical UAV, Avibras
- Azimute Santos Lab Comercio e Industria Aerospacial Ltda.
- BQM-1BR First Brazilian UAV/target of the CBT (Companhia Brasileira de Tratores).
- Caçador, developed from Israeli IAI Heron
- Carcara Infantry portable UAV, in service with the Brazilian Marine Corps Santos Lab Comercio e Industria Aerospacial Ltda.
- Carcara II New version of Carcara for the Navy, Santos Lab Comercio e Industria Aerospacial Ltda.
- Dumont - New Technologies,
- Eletron UAV of the BRVANT.
- Flight Technologies FS-01 Watchdog Brazilian Tactical reconnaissance UAV
- Flight Technologies FS-02 AvantVision Brazilian mini UAV
- Flight Technologies FT-100 Horus Soldier portable UAV, in small service in the Brazilian army Flight Technologies based on FS-02
- Flight Technologies FT-200 Watchdog Brazilian Tactical reconnaissance UAV by Flight Technologies based in FS-01
- Flight Technologies VT-15 UAV In test of the Brazilian Army, based on Flight Technologies FT-200 Watchdog.
- Gyro 200 ED mini-UAV Quadcopter of the Gyrofly Innovations.
- Gyro 500 Mini-UAV Quadcopter of the Gyrofly Innovations.
- Harpia This is a medium size tactical UAV of the Harpia Systems (Joint-Venture of the Embraer Defense and Security, AEL Systems and Avibras), halted in January 2016
- Hornet H2 UAV of the BRVANT.
- Jabirú Santos Lab Comercio e Industria Aerospacial Ltda.
- Proton UAV of the BRVANT.
- SARVant Surveillance UAV developed by a consortium of OrbiSat (SAR Radar) Aeroalcool (airframe) and AGX (flight controls).
- Sea Runner target of the Brazilian Air Force.
- Stella Tecnologia Atobá XR remotely controlled UAV capable of autonomous flight and attack operations
- Tiriba Brazilian mini UAV by AGX Tecnologia.4 kg, light civilian UAV
- XMobots Apoema 1000B LALE (low-altitude long-endurance) (2009)
- XMobots Nauru 500C, used by both the Brazilian Air Force and Brazilian Navy. Used by the CENSIPAM during Operation Catramani II.

== Canada ==
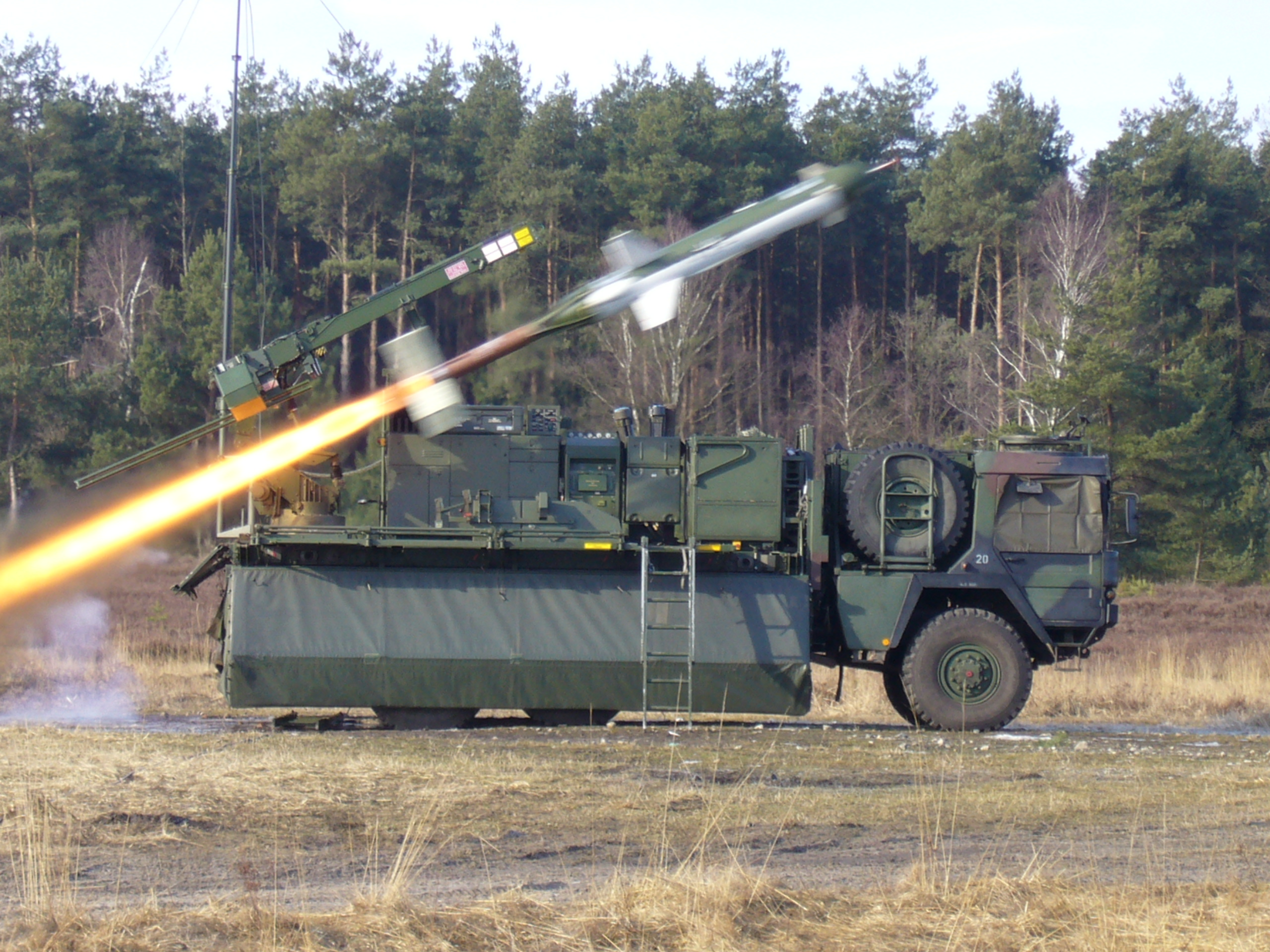
CL-289, reconnaissance (1990)

- Aeryon Scout, reconnaissance (2009)
- Aeryon SkyRanger R60, reconnaissance (2013)
- Aeryon SkyRanger R70, reconnaissance (2017)
- Aeryon SkyRaider R80D, reconnaissance (2017)
- Canadair CL-89, reconnaissance (1964) - joint funded by UK, later by West Germany as well
- CL-289, reconnaissance (1990)
- CL-227 Sentinel, reconnaissance (1977)
- CL-327 Guardian, reconnaissance (1996)
- CH-160, reconnaissance (2009)
- CU-162 Vindicator (2011)
- Draganflyer X4, surveillance (2009)
- Draganflyer X6, surveillance (2009)
- Draganflyer X8, surveillance (2010)
- Draganfly Tango, reconnaissance
- Meggitt Vindicator II (CU-162)
- PrecisionHawk Lancaster, agriculture (2010)
- Prioria Robotics Maveric
- Silver Fox ALIX (Atlantic Littoral Intelligence Surveillance and Reconnaissance Experiment) (2004)
- ADVANCED SUBSONICS/XIPHOS Grasshopper (2000)
- MMIST CQ-10 Snowgoose (2000)

== Chile ==
- Sirol, reconnaissance and research (2007)
- Sirol 221, reconnaissance and meteorology research (2008)
- Stardust II, reconnaissance and aerial imaging(2010)
- Lascar UAV, reconnaissance (2012)

== Colombia ==
- Navigator X2
- Araknos V2, multirotor. Advector, Unmanned Systems
- Koleopteros, multirotor. Advector, Unmanned Systems
- Buteos LTE, fixed wing. Advector, Unmanned Systems

== Costa Rica ==
- SA-SkyHunter, aerial mapping (2014)

== Croatia ==
- BL M-99 Bojnik

== Czech Republic ==
- HAES 400, small aerial target (2009)
- Primoco UAV
- Sojka III
- Spark Jan Zizka
- ThunderFly TF-G2 autogyro
- Xyris 6

== Denmark ==
- Danish Aviation Systems: Ebee, Sensefly Albris, Swinglet Cam.
- Sky-Watch: RQ-35 Heidrun EO/IR and mapping.

== Egypt ==
- 6th of October
- NUT
- 30 June
- Aisheng ASN-209

== Finland ==
- MASS Mini-UAV, reconnaissance

== France ==
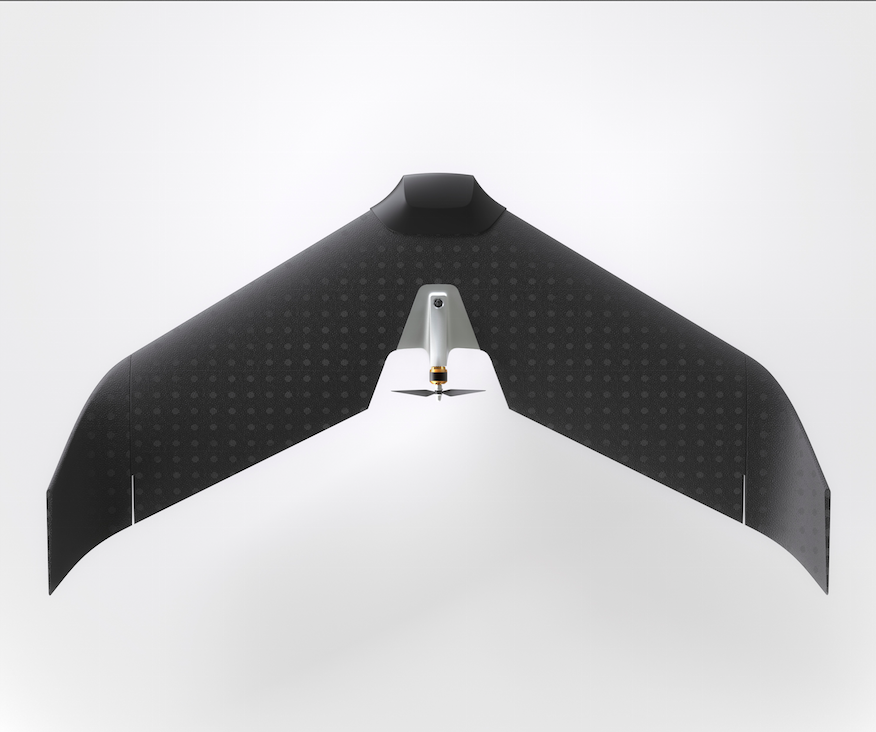
Lehmann Aviation L-A series 2016

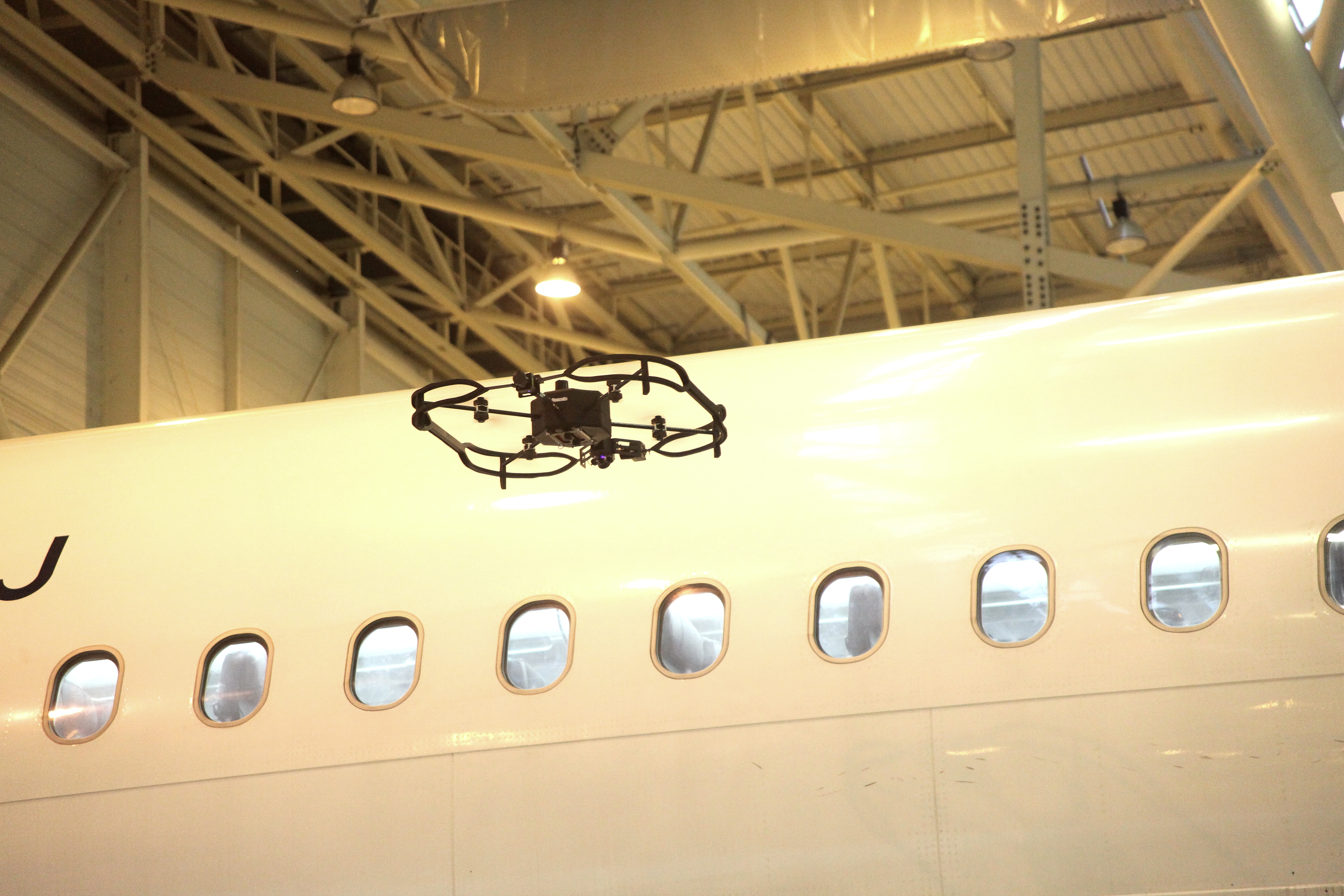
Donecle drone performing an autonomous inspection of an aircraft.

- Aérospatiale C.22, target drone
- Altec MART
- ARSAERO CT 10
- CAC K100
- CAC Fox
- Dassault LOGIDUC
  - Dassault AVE-D Petit Duc, research (2000)
  - Dassault AVE-C Moyen Duc, research (2001)
- Dassault nEUROn, combat (was expected in 2011)
- Dassault-Sagem SlowFast, reconnaissance (2004)
- Delair
- Donecle drone, autonomous aircraft inspection
- EADS Harfang, reconnaissance (2006)
- EADS Talarion
- Flying-Robots FR102, softs wings based (2008)
- Lehmann Aviation L-A series civilian drones, for high precision mapping, mining/construction, precision agriculture
- Lehmann Aviation L-M series civilian drones, for long-range real-time surveillance
- Nord CT.10 (Arsenal / SFECMAS Ars.5.501)
- Nord CT.20 (Arsenal / SFECMAS T.5.510)
- Nord CT.41
- Novadem NX70
- Parrot AR.Drone
- SAGEM Crecerelle
- SAGEM Patroller
- SAGEM Sperwer, reconnaissance
- SURVEY Copter Aliaca & Aliaca ER, Small Tactical UAS
- SURVEY Copter CAPA-X, Light Tactical UAS
- SURVEY Copter DVF2000ER, Small Tactical UAS
- SURVEY Copter Tracker, Small Tactical UAS
- Techno-Sud Vigilant
- Turgis & Gaillard Aarok, MALE Turboprop drone with a 1500 kg payload (2023)
- Verhagen X2 Autonomous Helicopters, flycam reconnaissance (2008)

== Germany ==
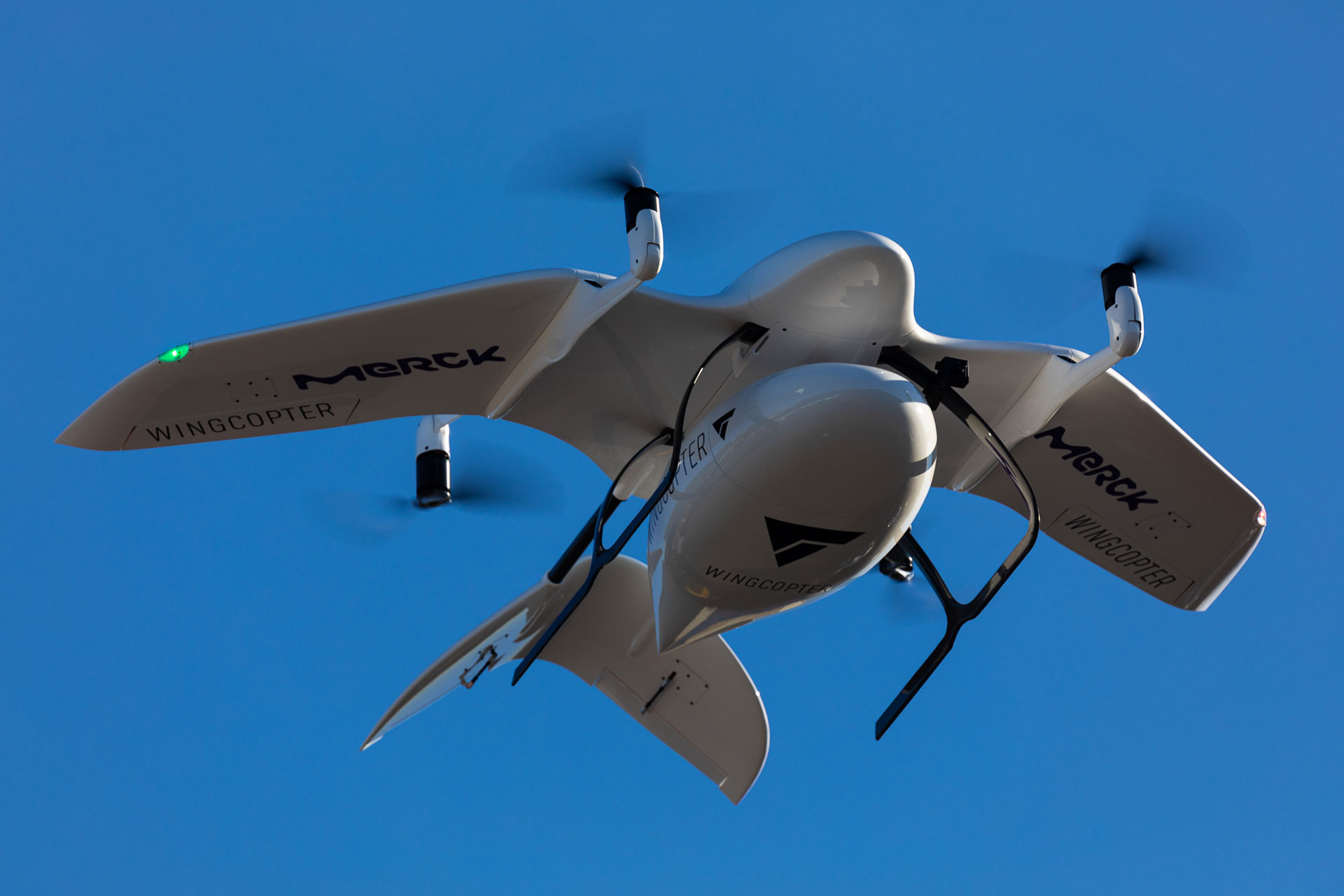
Wingcopter 178 HL UAV on a trial medical sample delivery flight for Merck Group.

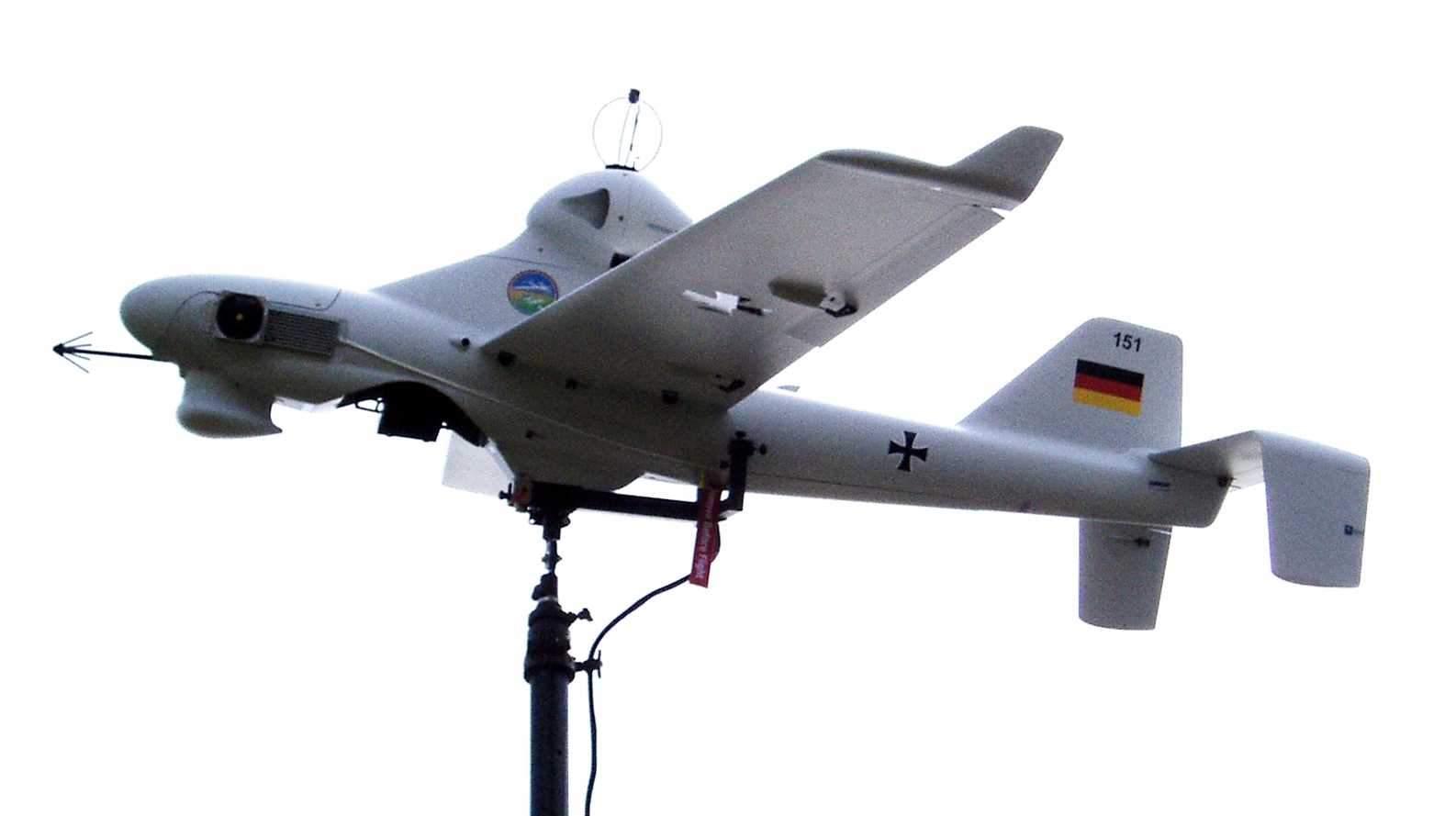
Luna X 2000 UAV for reconnaissance and ESM missions of the German Army.

- Aibotix Aibot X6, multicopter for mapping and industry
- AiDrones AiD-H14, industrial helicopter UAV
- AiDrones AiD-H25, industrial helicopter UAV
- AiDrones AiD-H40, industrial helicopter UAV
- Airbus Sagitta, jet powered UAV developed as part of the Open Innovation initiative
- Arado Ar E.377 und Ar E.377A (air to ship)
- Argus As 292, anti-aircraft target drone (1937)
- Argus Fernfeuer
- Blohm & Voss BV 143A und BV 143B (air to ship)
- Blohm & Voss BV 246 (air to surface, also known as Blohm & Voss BV 226)
- Blohm & Voss BV 950 L10 und BV 950 L11 (air to ship)
- AscTec Falcon 8, industrial octocopter for aerial imaging (UAV)
- AscTec Firefly, hexacopter for research and development (UAV)
- AscTec Hummingbird, quadrocopter for research and development (UAV)
- AscTec Pelican, quadrotor for research and development UAV
- Birdpilot X-4 Multicopter, lightweight long endures industrial quadcopter for aerial imaging (UAV)
- Birdpilot X-8 Multicopter, compact industrial octocopter for aerial imaging (UAV)
- Dornier Kiebitz
- EADS Barracuda, German-led program together with Spain
- EMT Aladin, reconnaissance
- EMT Fancopter, reconnaissance
- EMT Luna, reconnaissance
- EMT Luna NG, reconnaissance
- EMT Museco, ATOL helicopter, reconnaissance and communication
- EMT X-13
- EuroHawk, reconnaissance (developed together with the U.S.)
- Fieseler Fi 157 anti-aircraft target drone (1937)
- Globe UAV 6 LTE Hexacopter, compact industrial Copter for aerial imaging (UAV)
- Globe UAV 8 IXON LTE Octocopter, compact industrial Copter for aerial imaging (UAV)
- Globe UAV 4L AQUILA LTE Quadrocopter, compact industrial Copter for aerial imaging (UAV)
- Globe UAV 8L CEPTOR LTE Octocopter, compact industrial Copter for aerial imaging and transport (UAV)
- Globe UAV AVIUM 200 LTE VTOL, compact industrialVTOL for aerial imaging and transport (UAV)
- H-Aero
- Henschel Hs 117 (surface to airplane, air to air)
- Henschel Hs 293 (air to ship)
- Henschel Hs 294 (air to ship)
- Henschel Hs 298 (air to air)
- Hyfish
- Messerschmitt Enzian E-4 (surface to airplane)
- MikroKopter and variants QuadroKopter, HexaKopter and OktoKopter
- OFFIS Guard reconnaissance and research
- Quantum‑Systems Vector, Auterion AuterionOS, open-source any chip PX4 flight control software, EO/LWIR, Swarm Forge development platform, Skynode S (installed on any drone), Nemyx (local overwhelm swarm) engine software (for swarms of 50 anti-personnel drones per operator), Software-Defined Radio (SDR), AI module, (No Li-Fi or LiDAR) ISR only, FL14, 40 mph, 3 hrs, 20 km, 80 km at Minimum Reception Altitude (MRA)
- Rheinmetall KZO (reconnaissance)
- Ruhrstahl Kramer X-7 (air to tank, also known as Ruhrstahl Kramer 347)
- SIRIUS UAS (MAVinci)
- V-1 flying bomb (Vergeltungswaffen V-1 surface to surface, air to surface jet bomb, also known as Fieseler Fi 103)
- Wingcopter 178 Heavy Lift (Delivery Drone).

== Greece ==
- Aether Aeronautics ADS
- Aether Aeronautics PNS-1
- Altus LSA Uranos
- BSK Defense Erevos MALE reconnaissance UAV
- BSK Defense Ideon mini reconnaissance UAV
- BSK Defense Kyon mini reconnaissance UAV
- BSK Defense Phaethon G tactical reconnaissance UAV
- BSK Defense Phaethon J tactical reconnaissance UAV
- DELAER RX-3 surveillance and reconnaissance
- EADS 3 Sigma Alkyon
- EADS 3 Sigma Iris
- EADS 3 Sigma Nearchos reconnaissance (1996)
- EADS 3 Sigma Perseas
- EAV (HAI) Archytas (under development)
- EAV (HAI) Ε1-79 Pegasos reconnaissance (1982)
- EAV (HAI) Ε1-79 Pegasos II reconnaissance (2005)
- HCUAV surveillance UAV (2015)
- IDE Intracom Defence Lotus
- Spirit Aeronautical Systems (SAS Technology)TALOS MALE UAS
- Spirit Aeronautical Systems (SAS Teghnology) SARISA SRS-1A/C armed/cargo drone|
- Spirit Aeronautical Systems (SAS Teghnology) ARES ARS-1A/C Armed/Cargo Drone
- Spirit Aeronautical Systems (SAS Teghnology) EMPUSA-EMP-X4/X6 ISR Drone
- Spirit Aeronautical Systems (SAS Teghnology) AIHMI AHM-1X Stand Off Loitering Munition.
- UCANDRONE/EFA Archytas VTOL drone (not related to the EAV (HAI) Archytas project)
- UCANDRONE Blackbird
- UCANDRONE F220
- UCANDRONE Phoreas
- VELOS ROTORS V3
- Ypaspistis UCAV

== India ==
Rustom-1 UAV prototype

- DRDO Nishant
- DRDO Abhyas
- DRDO Ghatak (Stealth UCAV under development)
- DRDO Archer
- India-U.S Joint ALUAV target drone.
- HAL RUAV-200
- Adani Hermes 900 : Adani Groups manufactures Israeli Hermes 900 drones.
- Trinetra UAV
- Hal Cats : Combat Air Teaming System including stealth UAV's.
- DRDO Rustom
- TAPAS-BH-201 (Rustom II)
- DRDO Fluffy
- DRDO Imperial Eagle
- DRDO Kapothaka
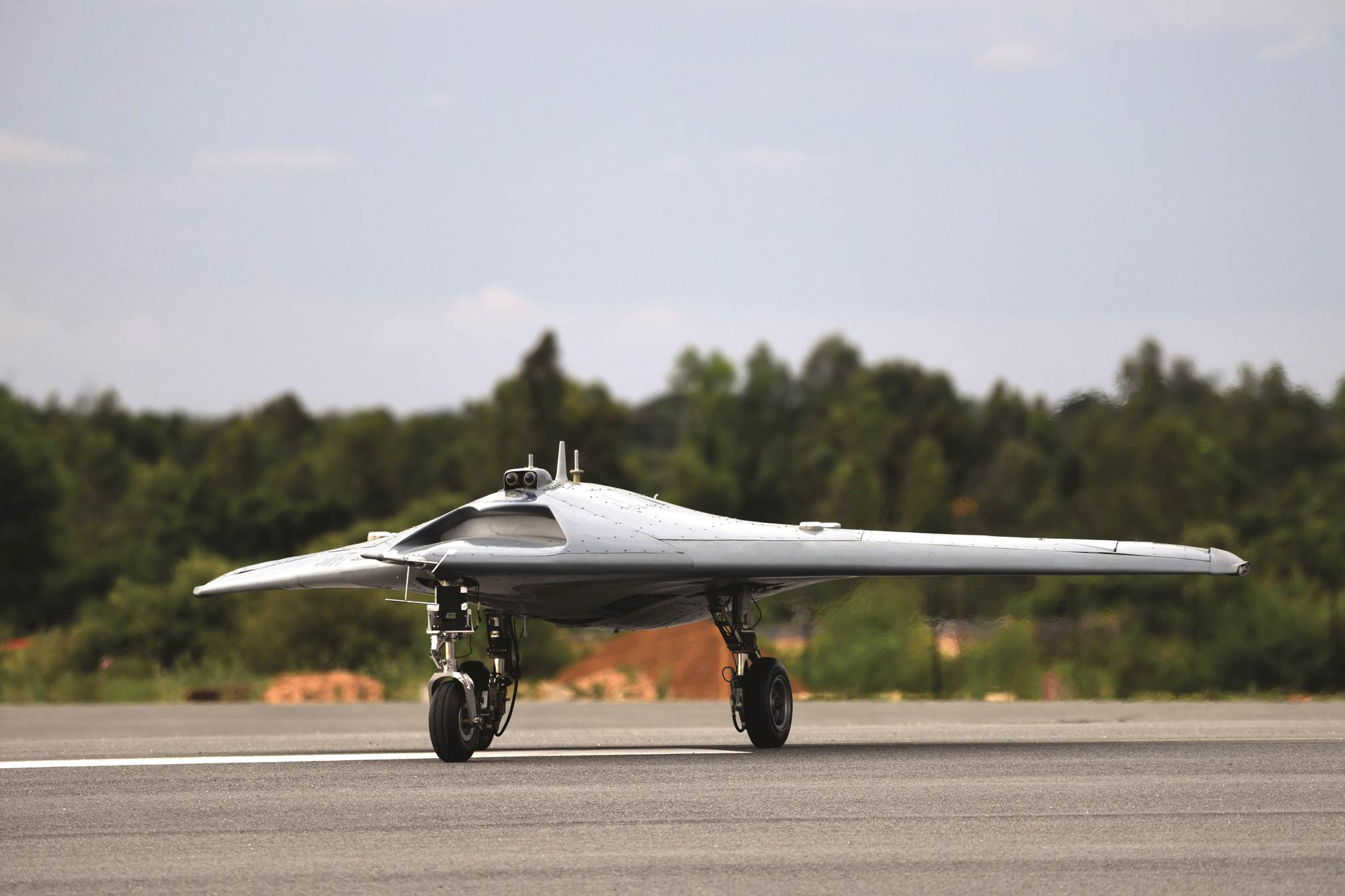
  DRDO Stealth UAV
- DRDO Lakshya
- DRDO Netra
- DRDO Ulka
- IAI-HAL NRUAV
- INDRONES SOLUTIONS PVT. LTD
- Maraal
- NAL / ADE Black Kite
- NAL / ADE Golden Hawk
- NAL / ADE Pushpak
- NAL Slybird
- Pawan UAV
- ZMotion TRINETRA
- SWITCH UAV
- Raphe mPhibr Nistaar
- MagnumWings Viper

== Indonesia ==
- PUNA (Pesawat Udara Nir-Awak) Sriti, Alap-Alap, Gagak, Pelatuk, and Wulung, made by Badan Pengkajian dan Penerapan Teknologi, now part of Badan Riset dan Inovasi Nasional)
- LSU-02, (Lapan Surveillance UAV-02), LSU-03, and LSU-05, made by Lembaga Antariksa dan Penerbangan Nasional, now part of Badan Riset dan Inovasi Nasional)
- Elang Hitam (IAe Male UAV, Made by PT IAe - 2020)
- LTD (Large Target Drone, Made by PT Mandiri Mitra Muhibbah - 2006)
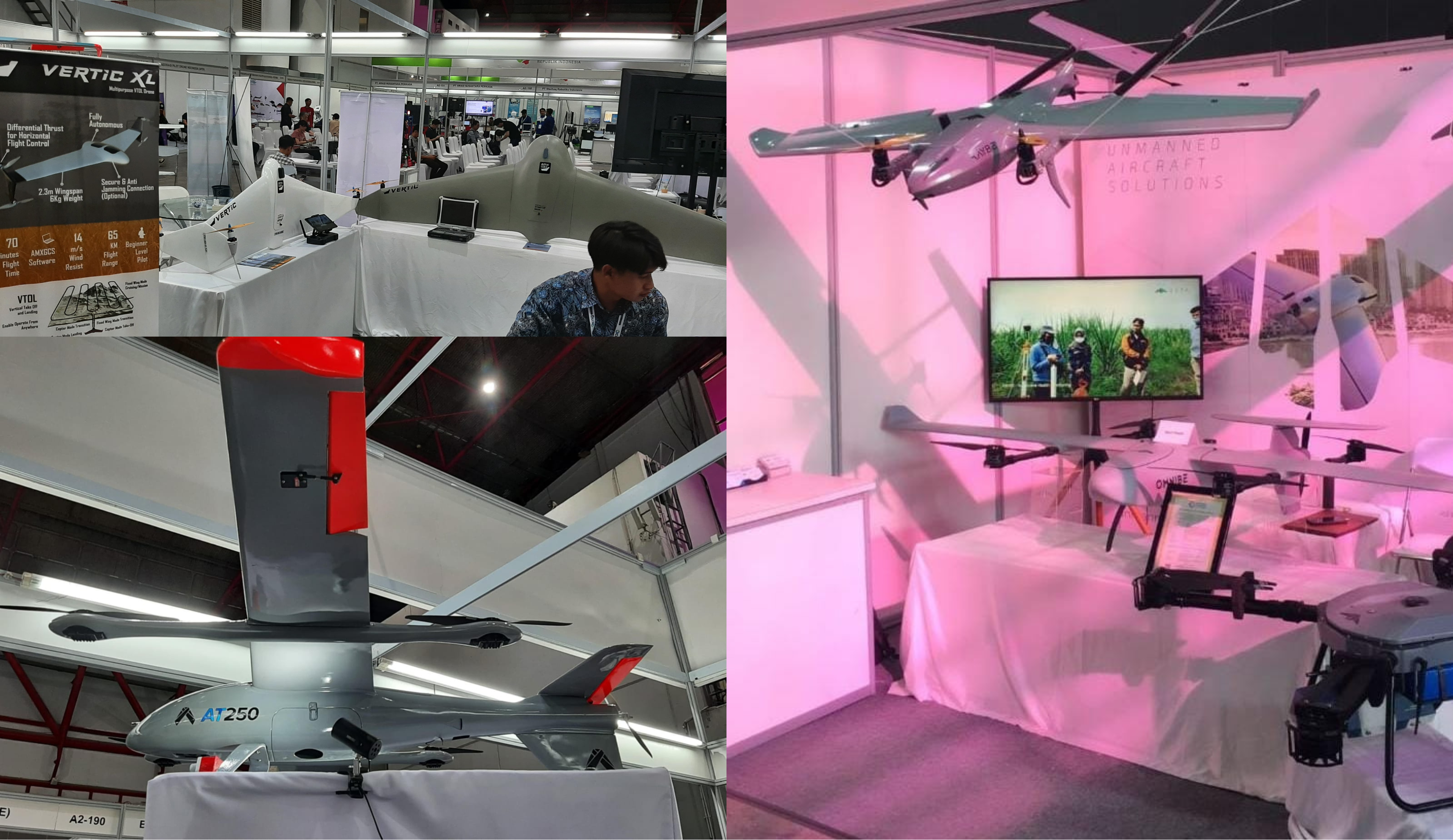
  Various drone showcased during Indonesia Drone Expo 2024. From top-left, clockwise: AMX UAV Vertic and Vertic XL; BETA UAS Raybe, Omnibe and IRIS; Aero Terra Indonesia AT-250.
- AMX Vertic and Vertic XL (tail-sitter drone with 4 rotors for mapping/surveillance), Qubit (educational quadcopter for early robotic learning) made by AMX UAV, a drone startup based in Yogyakarta
- Sekar Agri, a class of sprayer drone made by Smart Transportation Solutions (branded as Frogs.id), a drone start up based in Yogyakarta that also made the first Indonesian flying taxi, F-282.
- BVD-V25 (electric fixed-wing VTOL for surveillance), BVD-F11 (fixed wing drone for mapping), BVD-M14 (multifunction quadrotor) and BVD-M16 (hexarotor with floater for pollution sniffing) made by Beehive Drone, a drone start up based in Yogyakarta.
- AiV-330 (electric fixed-wing VTOL for surveillance), AiV-400 (fuel powered, fixed-wing VTOL for ship-based operation), Malinau (conventional twin-boom design for military surveillance), and AT-250 (electric fixed-wing VTOL for mapping), made by Aerro Terra Indonesia, one of the oldest drone company in Indonesia (founded in 2010) based in Jakarta
- MiniBe (flying wing for mapping, could be modified as a loitering munition), RayBe (tilt-rotor mapping drone), Iris (multipurpose quadrotor for inspection, cargo and surveillance), and OmniBe (hybrid fixed-wing VTOL for wide area surveillance), made by Bentara Tabang Nusantara (BETA UAS), a drone startup company based in Bandung
- Palapa S1, fuel engine fixed-wing VTOL made by UGM designed to monitor forest fire

== International ==
- BGAC develops drones in China on helicopters & aircraft imported from USA, EU & CIS
- Dassault nEUROn (France/Sweden/Switzerland/Greece/Italy/Spain)
- EADS Barracuda (Spain/Germany)
- EADS Talarion
- IAI-HAL NRUAV
- Singular Aircraft SA03 (UK/Spain)

== Iran ==
List of Iranian drone bases

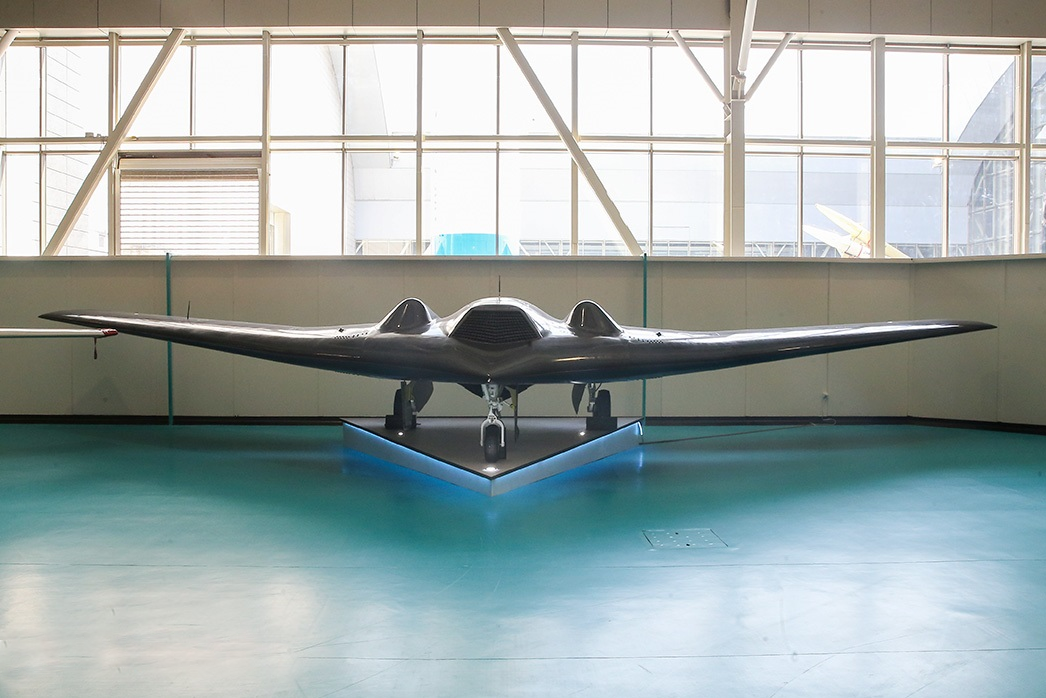
Shahed 171

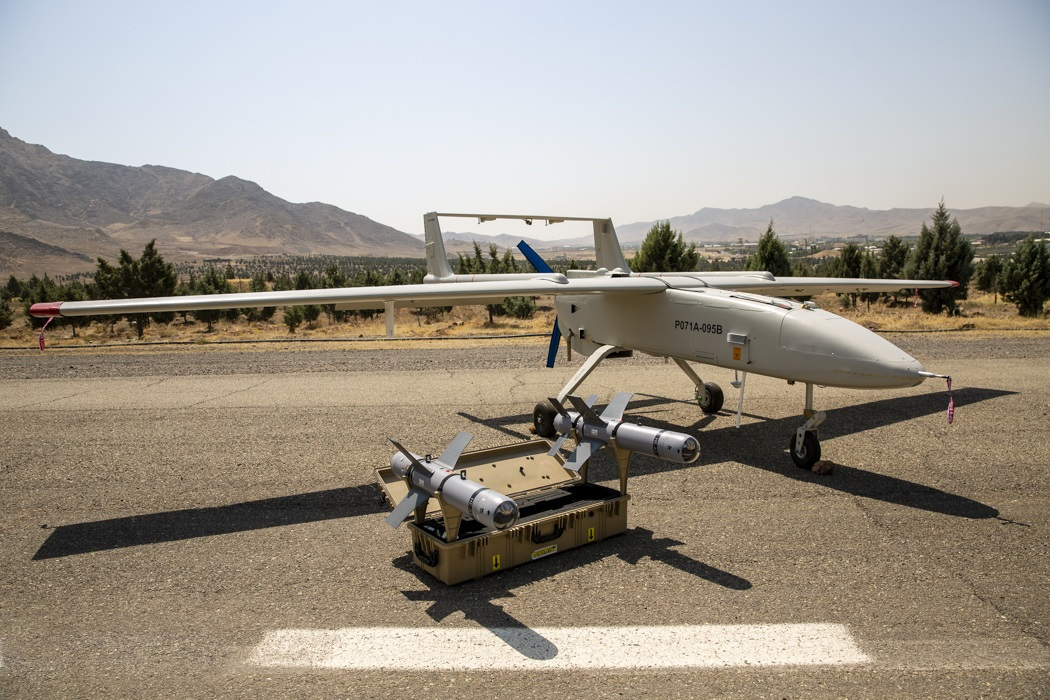
Mohajer-6

- HESA Ababil
- Hemaseh
- IAIO Fotros
- Fateh 1
- Karrar
- Mobin
- Meraj
- Pars robot
- Qods Mohajer
- Qods Saeghe
- Sarir
- Shahbal
- Shahab
- Shahin 1
- Shahed 121
- Shahed 123
- Shahed 125
- Shahed 129
- Shahed 131
- Shahed 136
- Shahed 141
- Shahed 147
- Shahed 149
- Shahed 161
- Shahed 171
- Shahed 191
- Shahed 197
- Shahed-238
- Sofreh Mahi
- Saegheh
- Talash
- Yasir UAV
- Zohal
- Zhubin
- Pelikan 1
- Pelikan 2
- Homa UAV
- Kaman12
- Kaman19
- Kaman22
- Kian
- Arash UAV
- Omid
- Reid (Radwan 1)
- Rotor
- Chamrosh 4
- Captain Bee

== Israel ==
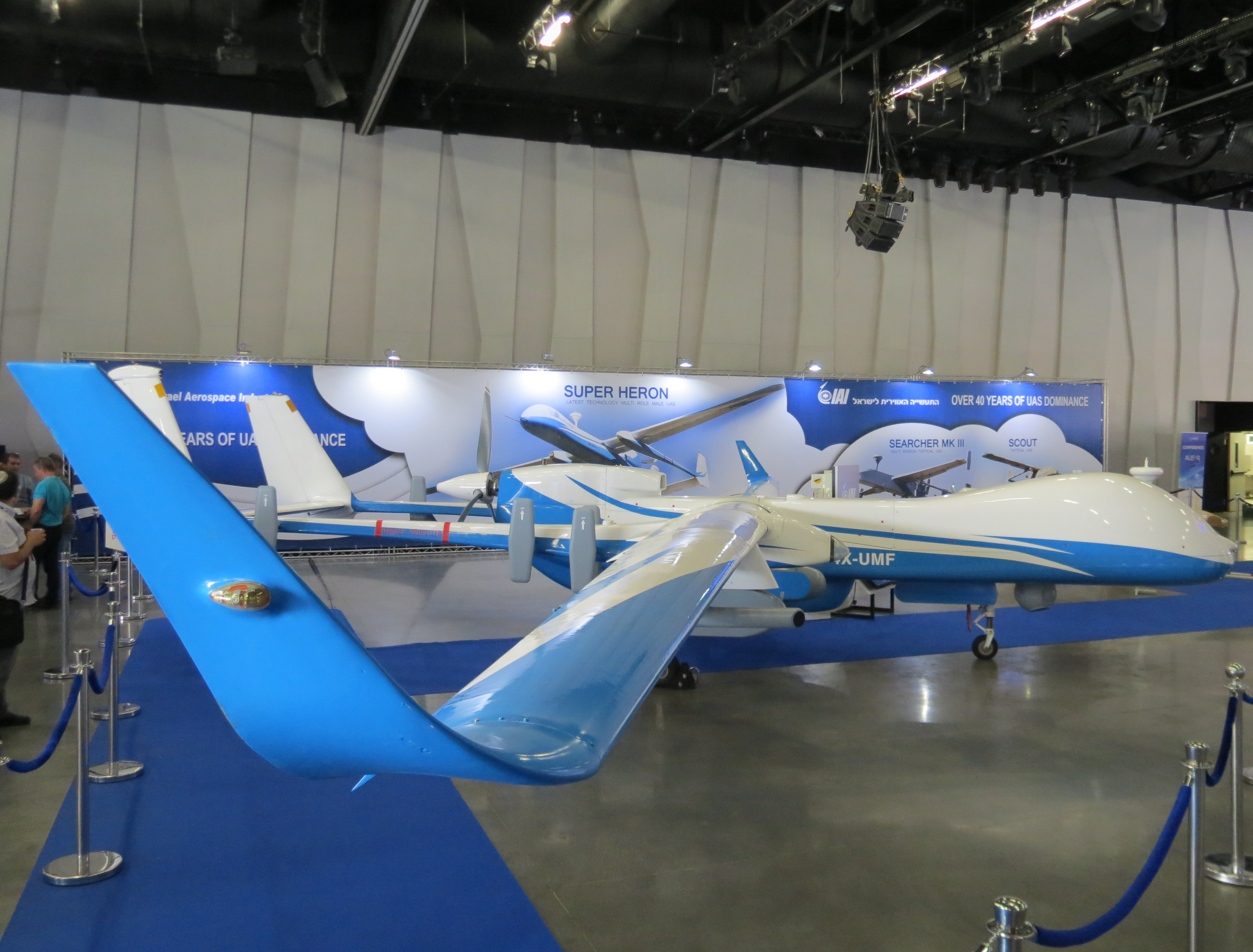
IAI Super Heron

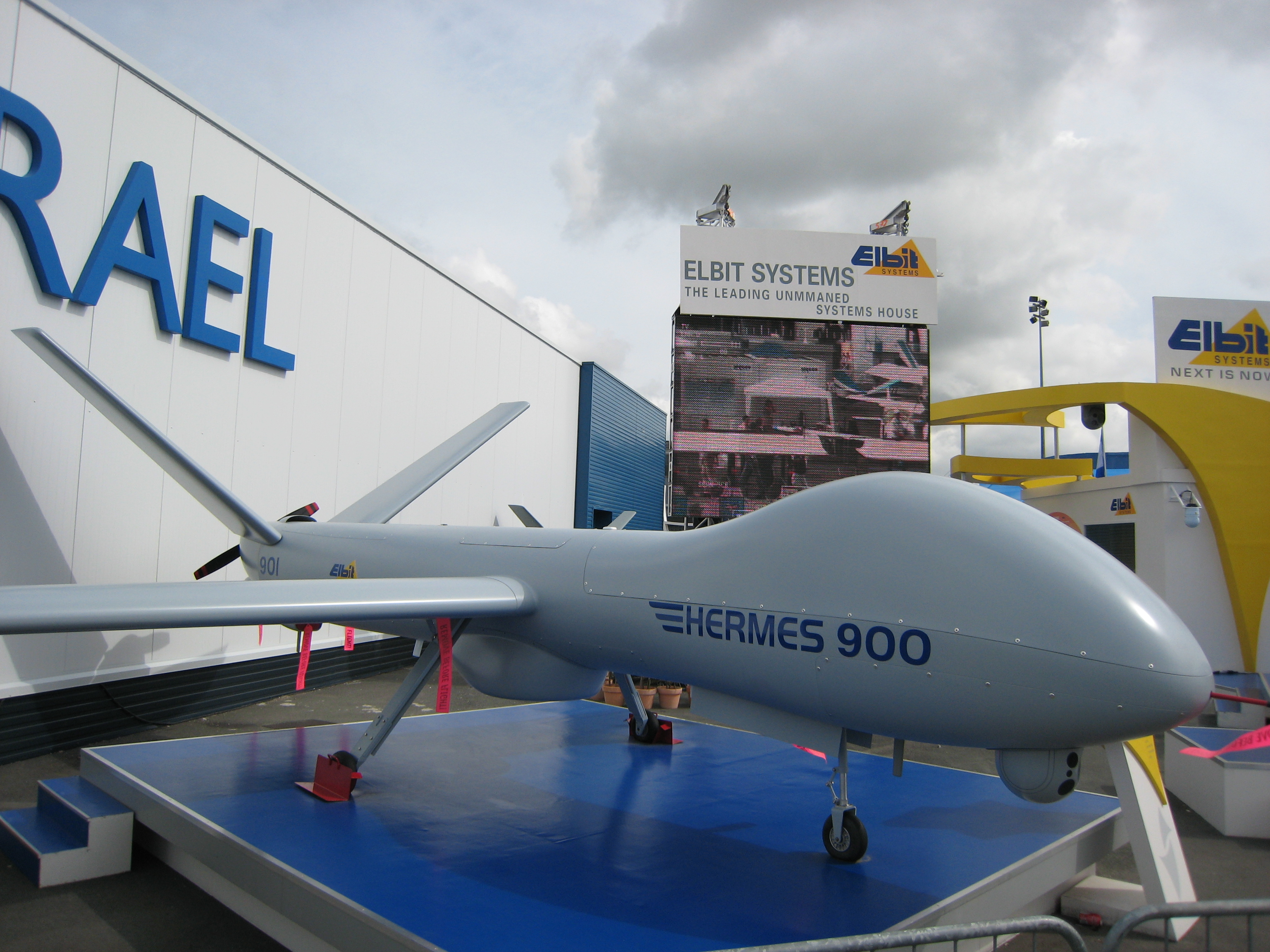
Elbit Hermes 900

- Top I Vision Casper 250
- Silver Arrow Micro-V
- Silver Arrow Sniper
- IAI Skylark – Canister Launched mini-UAV system
- IAI Scout
- IAI General
- IAI Harpy
- IAI Harop
- IAI I-View
- IAI Panther
- IAI Ranger (with Switzerland)
- IAI Heron
- IAI Eitan
- AAI RQ-2 Pioneer (with USA)
- AAI RQ-7 Shadow
- IAI Bird-Eye
- Elbit Skylark
- Elbit Hermes 90
- Elbit Hermes 450
- Elbit Hermes 900
- Aeronautics Defense Dominator
- Aeronautics Defense Orbiter
- Tactical Robotics Cormorant
- Tadiran Mastiff
- Urban Aeronautics X-Hawk

== Italy ==
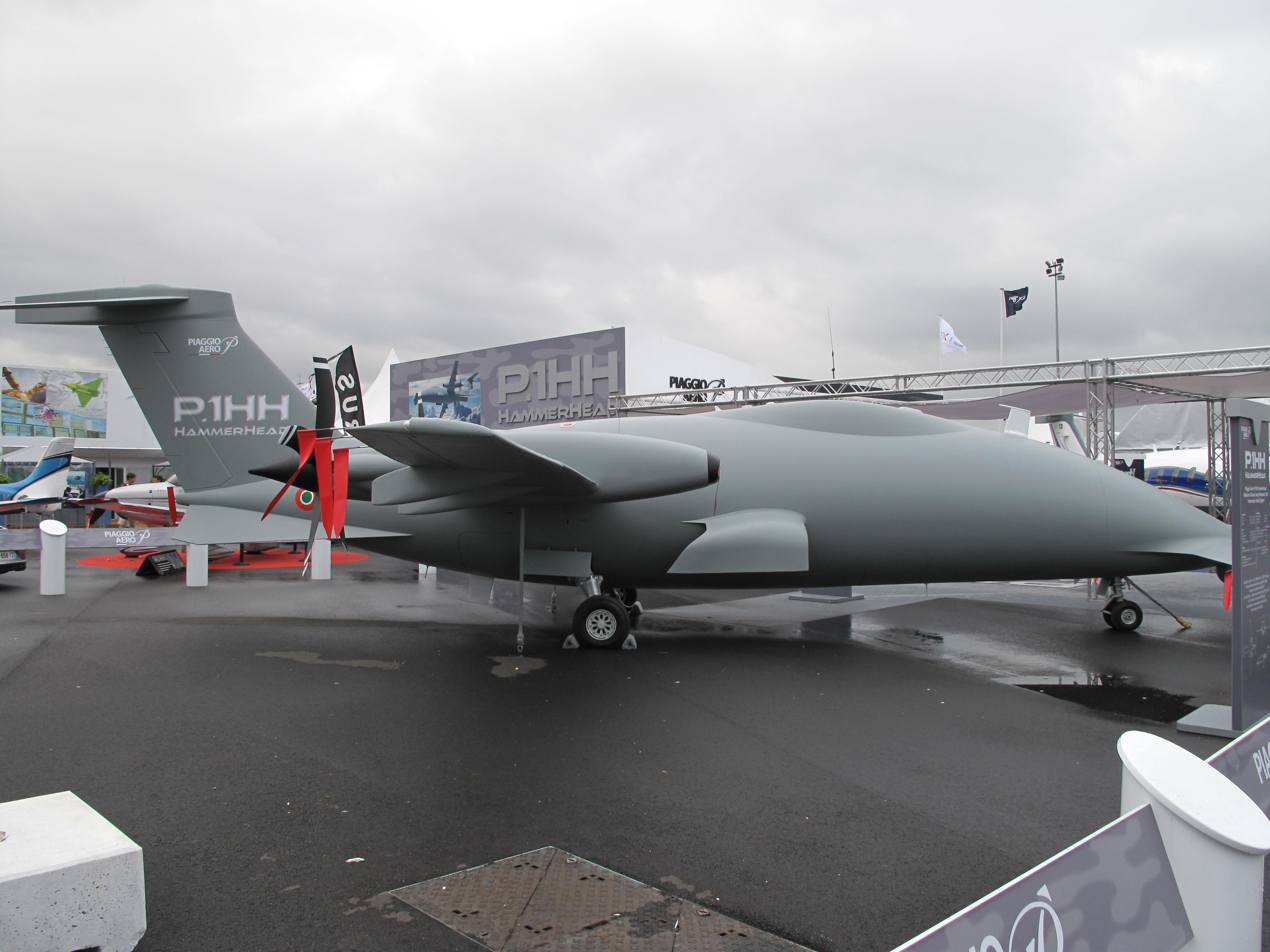
Piaggio P.1HH HammerHead

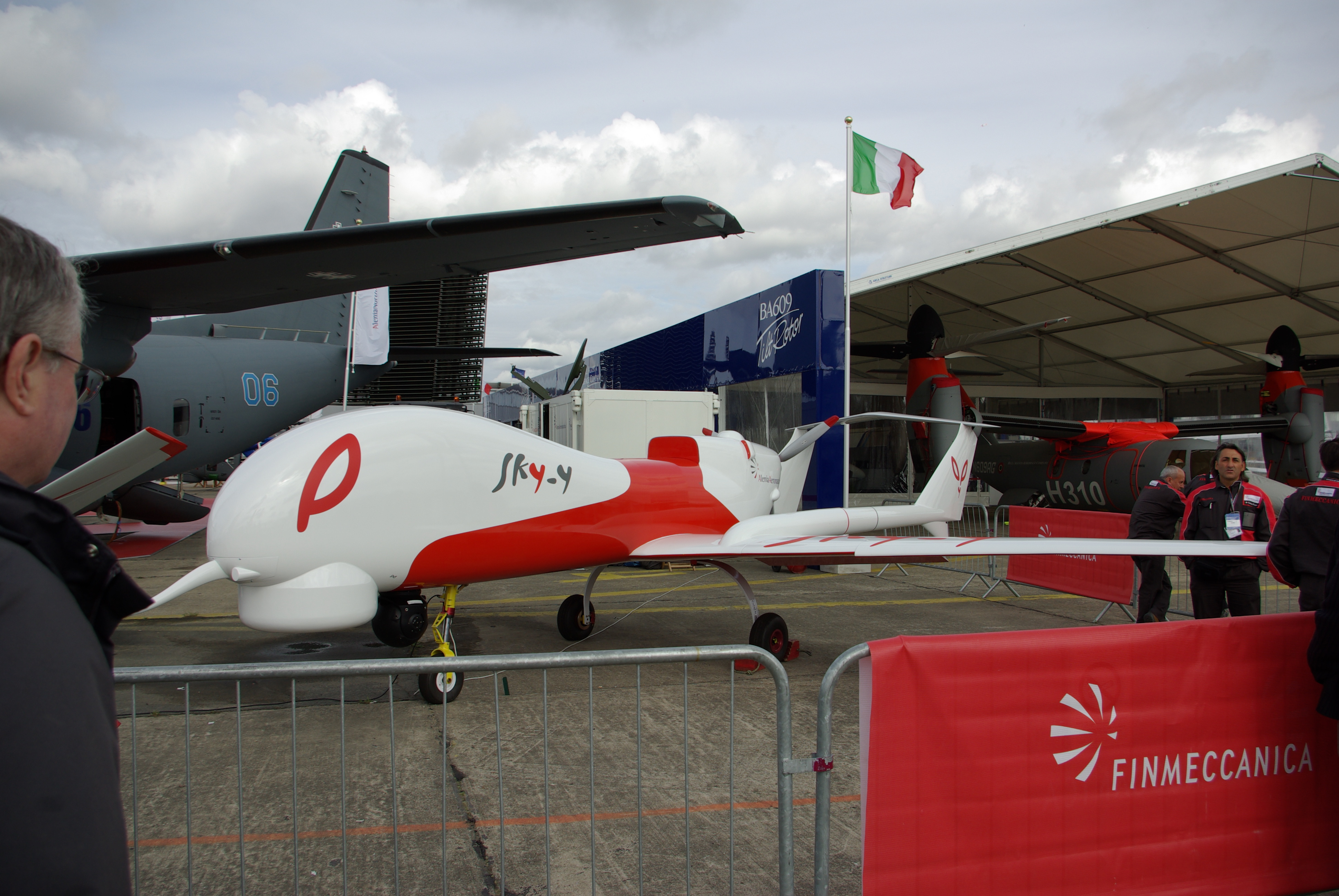
Sky-Y

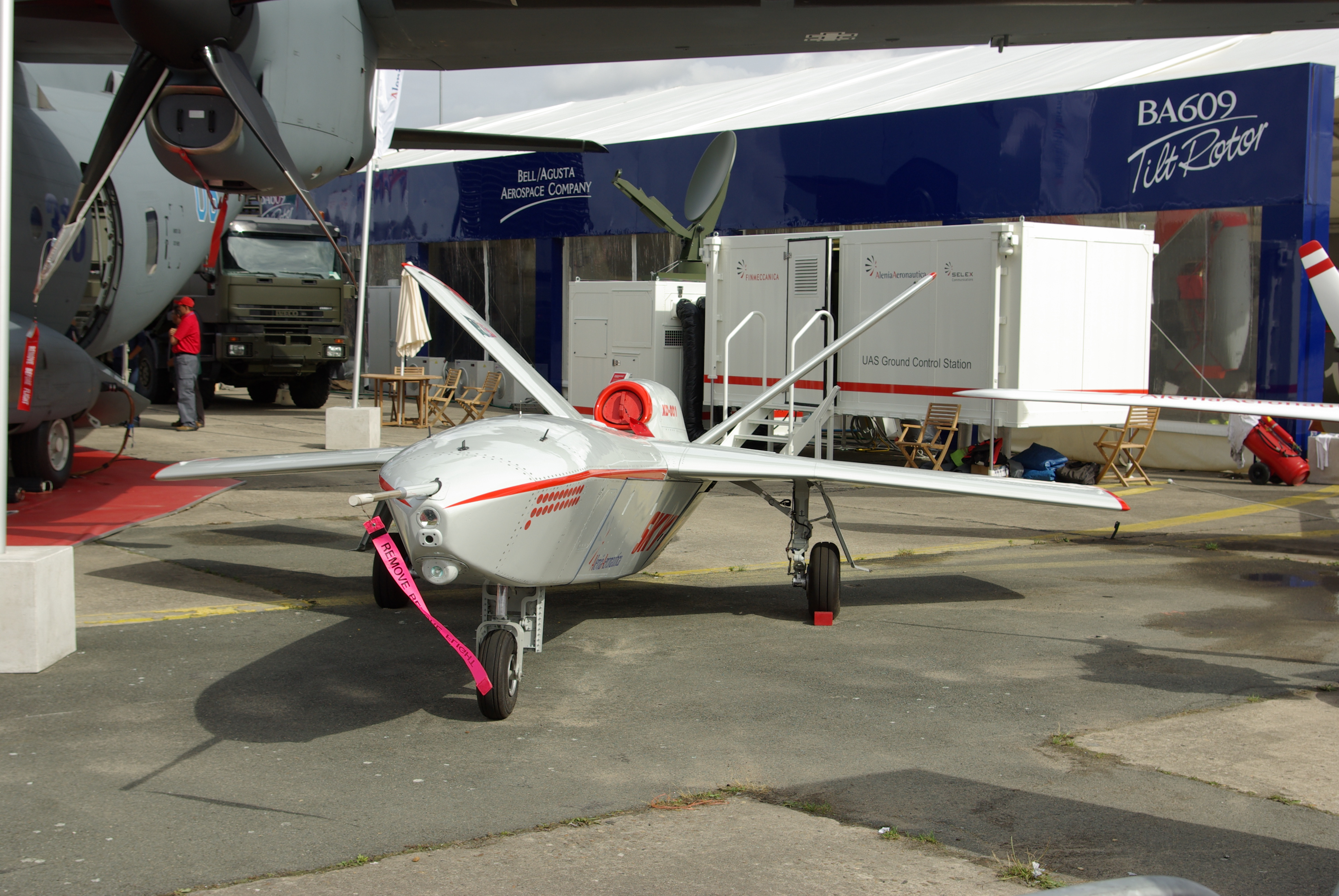
Sky-X

- Meteor, now SELEX Galileo Avionica Mirach series (Mirach 26, Mirach 150), target drone and reconnaissance variants
- SELEX Galileo Avionica NIBBIO, tactical reconnaissance
- SELEX Galileo Avionica FALCO, reconnaissance
- Alenia Aeronautica Sky-x, research UCAV (2005)
- Alenia Aeronautica Sky-y, research-reconnaissance MALE (2007)
- Alenia Aeronautica Molynx/Black Lynx, reconnaissance HALE (in development)
- Alenia Aeronautica ITV
- Mirach 26
- Mirach 150
- Nimbus EosXi, Unmanned Aerial Vehicle in Hybrid airship configuration
- Piaggio P.1HH HammerHead
- Selex ES Falco

== Japan ==
- Fuji HK-2B
- Kawasaki KAQ-1, target
- Yamaha R-MAX, industrial
- Kawasaki Ki-147 I-Go-1A (air to surface)
- Mitsubishi Ki-148 I-Go-1B (air to surface)

== Jordan ==
- Jordan Falcon

== Latvia ==
- UAVFACTORY Penguin B dual-purpose (civil/military), fixed-wing UAV (2010)
- FIXAR: FIXAR 007 (civilian), fixed-wing vertical take-off and landing UAV

== Malaysia ==
- HiiLSE Drone Malaysia
- Eagle ARV System
- CTRM Aludra

== Mexico ==
- S4 Ehécatl by Hydra Technologies
- E1 Gavilán by Hydra Technologies

== Netherlands ==
- Aviolanda AT-21
- Avy Aera
- High Eye HE60, Cam helicopter
- High Eye Airboxer
- Verhagen X2
- Geocopter B.V.
- Mine Kafon Drone

== New Zealand ==
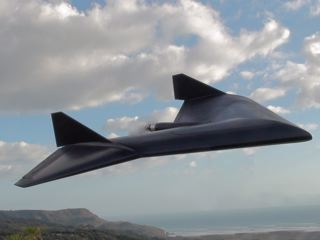
Valkyrie from X-craft Enterprises

- KAHU-HAWK
- RQ-84 AreoHawk Hawkeye UAV
- Hawkeye Systems Hawk GS-500
- X-craft Enterprises Valkyrie
- X-craft EnterpriseS Angelray

== Nigeria ==
- GULMA (nonoperational)
- Tsaigumi UAV

== Norway ==
- Aerobot Canard, developed by Robot Aviation
- SkyRobot FX20, developed by Robot Aviation
- SkyRobot FX450, developed by Robot Aviation
- Black Hornet Nano., developed by Prox Dynamics

== North Korea ==
- Domestically produced Chinese Sky-09P developed through North Korea's UAV program 2005-2014
- Saetbyol-4
- Saetbyol-9

== Pakistan ==
- Albadeey Technologies Ababeel III — (Target Drone)
- Albadeey Technologies Hud-Hud III — (Medium Range Drone)
- GIDS HUMA — (Remote Sensing Drone)
- GIDS Shahpar — (Reconnaissance Drone), Pakistan Air Force & Pakistan Army has inducted.
- GIDS Shahpar-2
- GIDS Shahpar-3
- GIDS Uqab — (Real Time Reconnaissance Drone), Pakistan Army has inducted.
- GIDS Uqab-II — (Naval Variant of the Uqab), Pakistan Navy has inducted first squadron.
- Integrated Dynamics Border Eagle — (Surveillance Drone)
- Integrated Dynamics Explorer — (Civilian Drone)
- Integrated Dynamics Hawk MK-V — (Surveillance Drone)
- Integrated Dynamics Hornet — (Surveillance Drone)
- Integrated Dynamics Hummer — (Multicopter Drone)
- Integrated Dynamics Nishan MK-II and TJ-1000 — (High-Speed Target Drone)
- Integrated Dynamics Rover MK-I & XS — (Civilian Scientific Data Gatherer Drone)
- Integrated Dynamics Shadow MK-II — (Surveillance Drone)
- Integrated Dynamics Tornado — (Decoy Drone)
- Integrated Dynamics Vector — (Surveillance Drone)
- Integrated Dynamics Vision MK-I and Mk-II — (Surveillance Drone)
- NESCOM Burraq — (Combat Drone), Pakistan Air Force & Pakistan Army has inducted.
- PAC Ababeel — (Small Scale Target Drone)
- PAC Baaz — (Large Scale Target Drone)
- PAC Falco — (Version of Italian Selex ES Falco drone built under license), Pakistan Air Force has inducted.
- SATUMA Flamingo — (Medium Range Reconnaissance Drone)
- SATUMA FST — (Full Scale Trainer Drone)
- SATUMA HST-Parwaz — (Half Scale Trainer Drone)
- SATUMA Jasoos I & Jasoos II Bravo+ — (Reconnaissance Drone), Pakistan Air Force has inducted.
- SATUMA Mukhbar — (Short Range Reconnaissance Drone)
- SATUMA Thunder SR and LR — (High Speed Target Drone)
- Sysverve Aerospace SAAD-1M Target Drone
- Sysverve Aerospace Hadaf-1 Target Drone
- Sysverve Aerospace Hadaf-2 Target Drone
- Sysverve Aerospace Ababeel FPV Target Drone
- Sysverve Aerospace Ababeel X Target Drone
- Sysverve Aerospace Shahab VTOL (Surveillance Drone)
- Sysverve Aerospace Shahab UCAV (Unmanned Combat Aerial Vehicle)
- Sysverve Aerospace Pasban QUAD-X EVTOL (Surveillance Drone)
- Sysverve Aerospace Black Arrow Tow Drone
- Sysverve Aerospace AeD Tow Target
- Sysverve Aerospace Mudabir Alpha (Loitering Munition)

== Peru ==
- CEDEP-1
- UAV FAP

== Philippines ==
- Knight Falcon
- Raptor
- TUAV

== Poland ==
- Aquila
- Casper 250/SOFAR
- CyberHub
- Dragonfly
- Drozd
- E-310
- Giez
- HAASTA
- ITWL NeoX-2 Duch
- ITWL HOB-bit
- ITWL Striker
- ILX-27
- PGZ-19R
- Pteryx UAV
- SKNL PRz PR5 Wiewiór plus - (Studenckie Koło Naukowe Lotników, Politechnika Rzeszowska - SKNL PRz)
- WB Electronics FlyEye
- WB Electronics FT5-Łoś
- WB Electronics Warmate
- WB Electronics X-FRONTER
- Flytronic UAV Tarkus

== Portugal ==
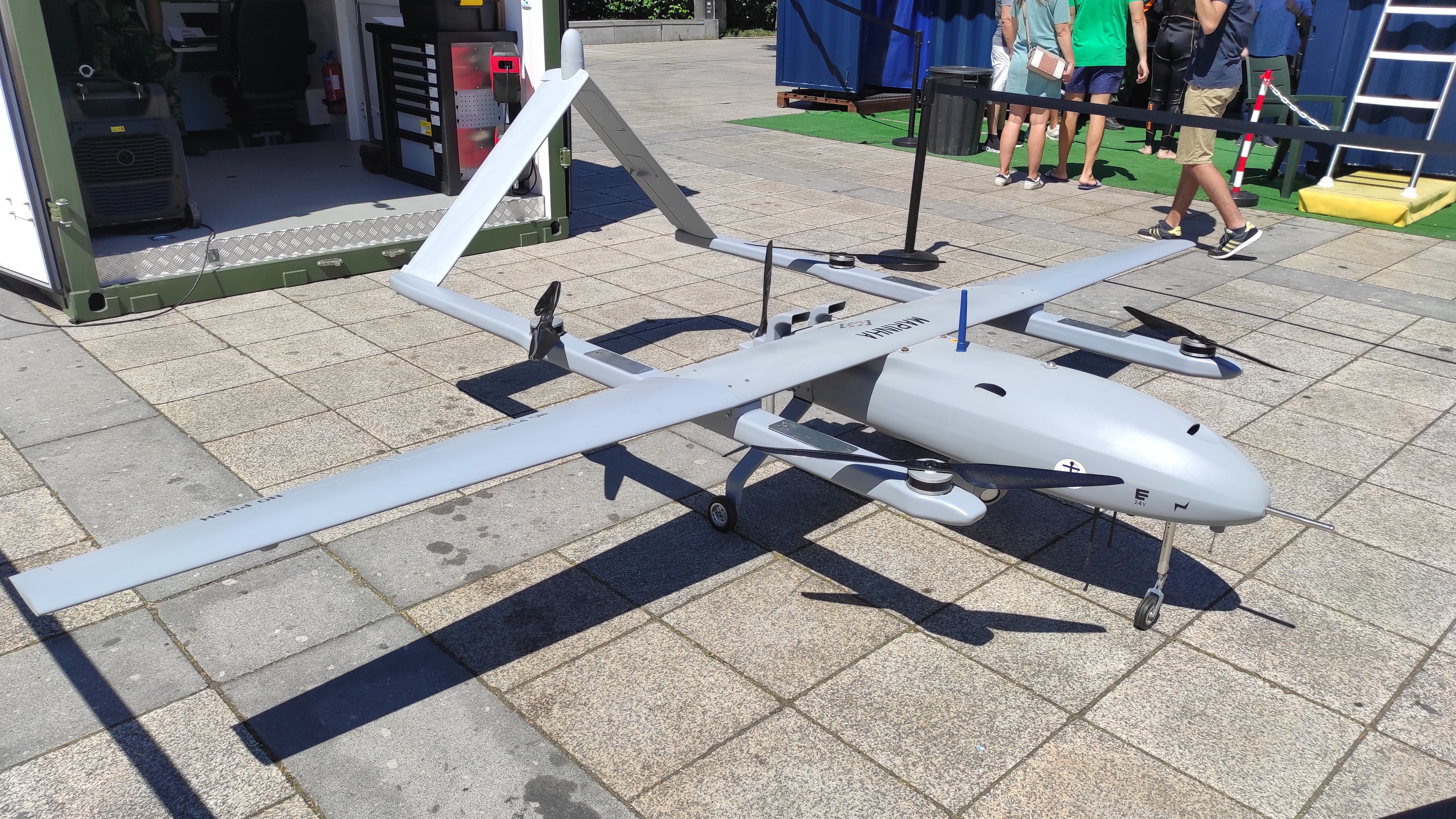
- UAVision OGASSA OGS42 VTOL of the Portuguese Navy.
  ANTEX-M
- Beyond Vision HEIFU
- Beyond Vision HEIFU PRO
- Beyond Vision VTOne
- Harpia Tech Vigilant
- Harpia Tech H24 Cruzer
- Harpia Tech No Brand
- QuadCopter UX-4001 Mini
- QuadCopter UX-401
- OctoCopter UX-801
- Tekever AR1
- Tekever AR3
- Tekever AR4
- Tekever AR5
- PAIC Império SP1
- UAVision OGASSA OGS42
- UAVision OGASSA OGS42V
- UAVision UX SPYRO
- UAVision WINGO
- UAVision WINGO S

== Romania ==
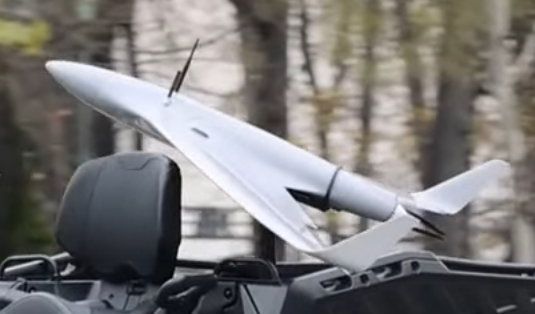
A Hirrus drone used by STS

- Air Strato
- Argus S - surveillance (2005)
- Argus XL - reconnaissance (2007)
- ATT-01 - target drone
- Hirrus - surveillance (2018)
- IAR-T - research, target and surveillance (1997)
- Quarrus - target drone
- SACT Boreal 5

== Russia ==
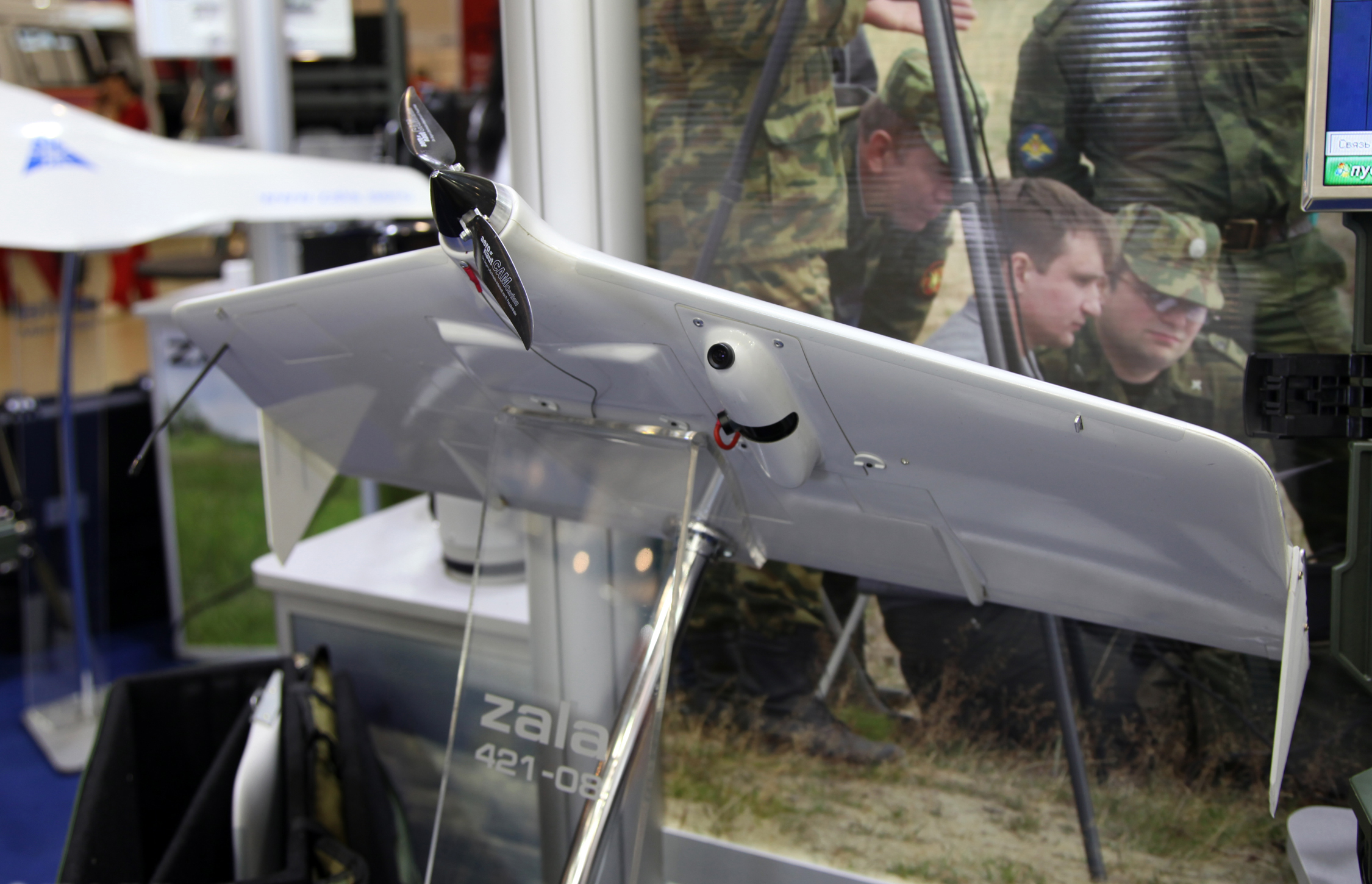
UAV ZALA 421-08, a man-portable Russian UAV capable of 90min flight time with video/photo/IR camera

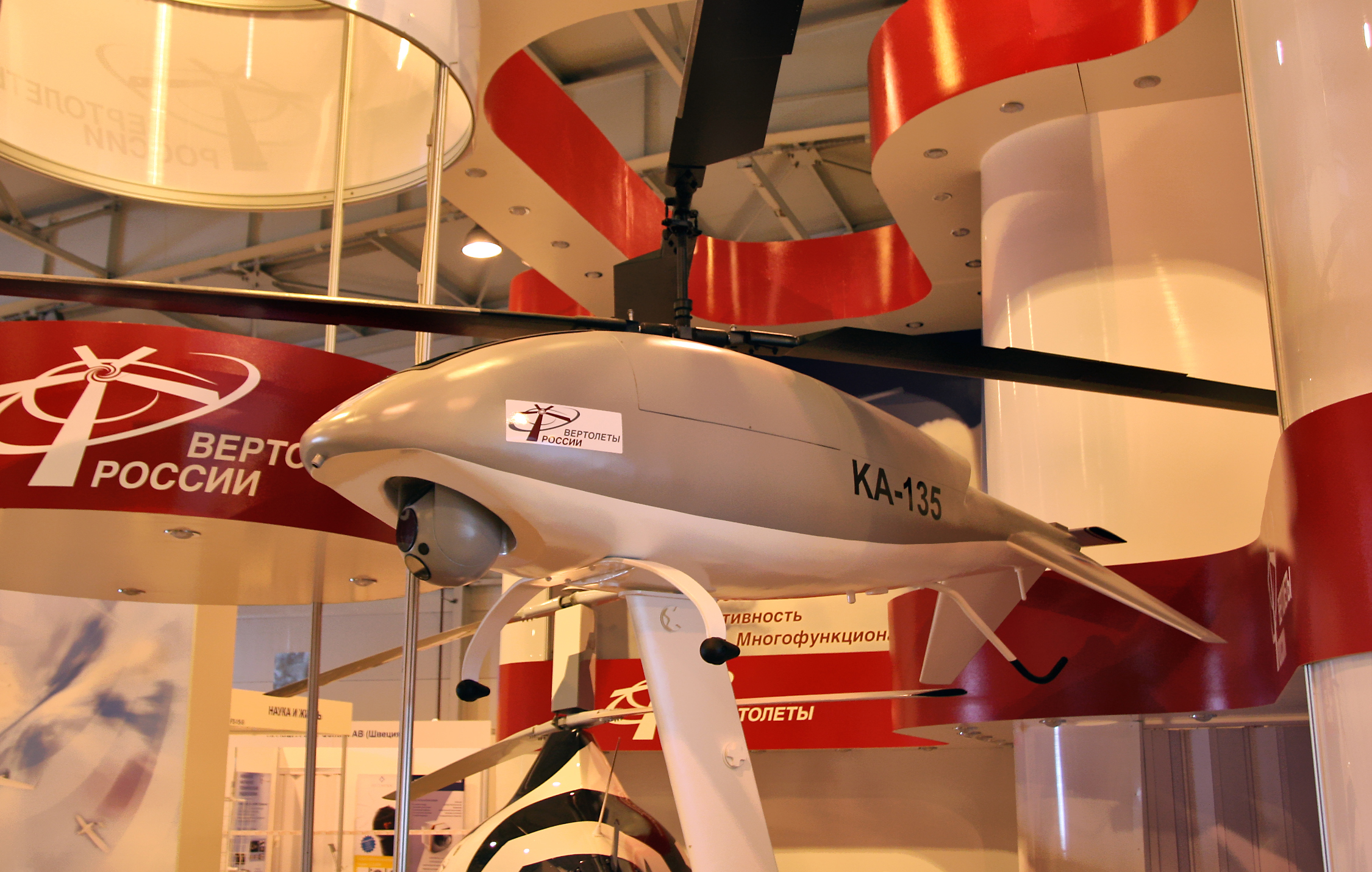
Ka-135

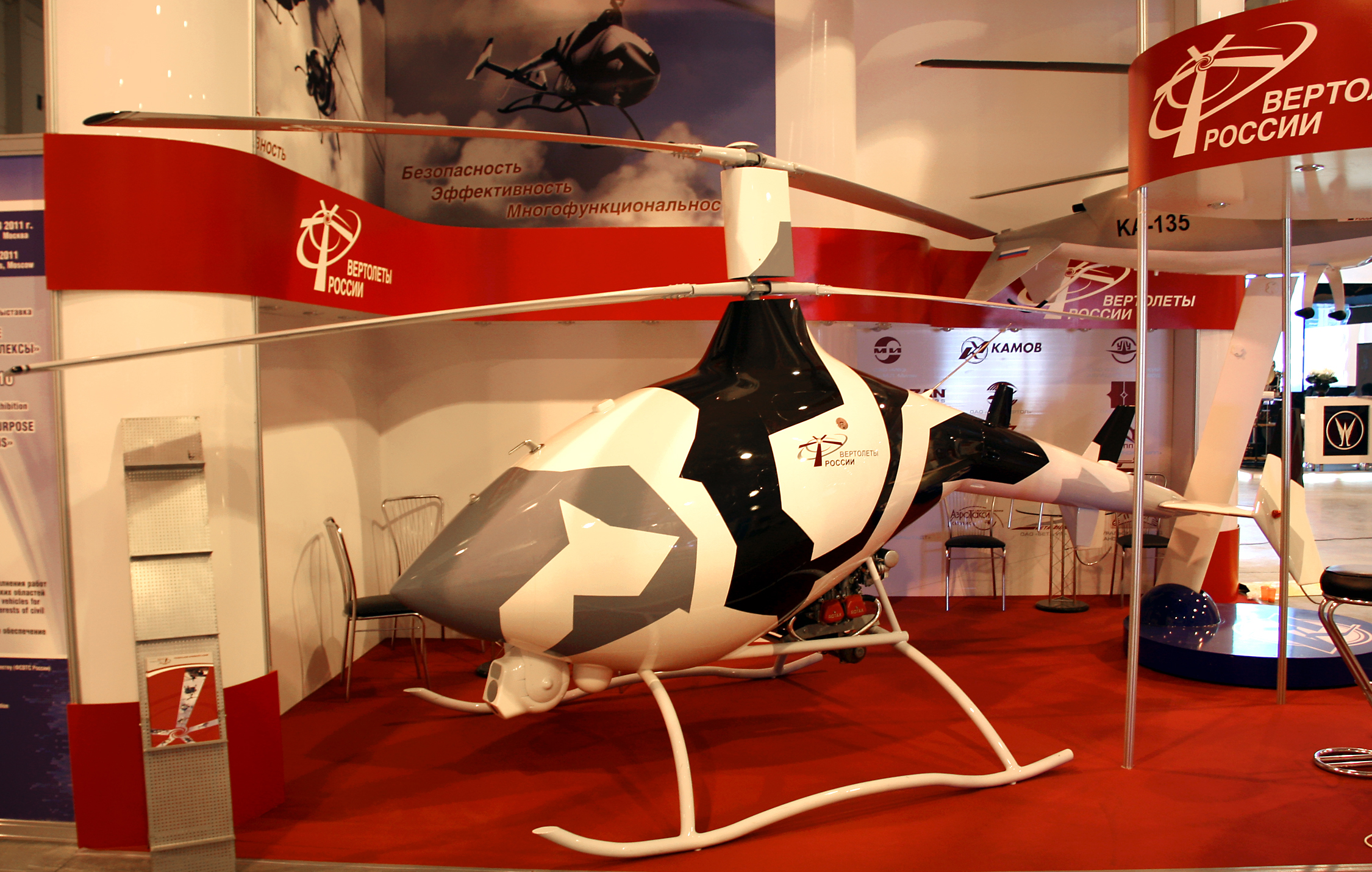
Ka-175 Korshun

- Aist ("Stork") — multirole UAV
- Almaz-Antey (manufacturer of the S-400) Volk-18 (en: Wolf-18) — interceptor of anti-personnel drones, autonomous (& final mile) AI, not coil-fed, net gun with 3 nets, 30 minute loiter
- Altius-RU — medium-altitude long-endurance reconnaissance and combat UAV
- Chirok — hybrid amphibious UAV vehicle
- Dozor-3 — heavy reconnaissance and combat UAV (2009)
- Dozor-50 — intelligence, surveillance (2007)
- Dozor-85 — aerial mapping, border patrol, surveillance
- Dozor-100 — intelligence, surveillance, reconnaissance unmanned aircraft system (2009)
- Dozor-600 — reconnaissance and combat UAV (late-2010)
- Eleron-3 — reconnaissance UAV
- ENICS E-95 / E08M - target drone
- Forpost — licensed copy of the Israel UAV Searcher MkII, Forpost-R is localized version
- Gerbera, accounts for 65% of the decoy sorties with Geran drones.
- Geoscan Lite — fixed-wing aerial survey UAV
- Geoscan 201 — fixed-wing aerial survey UAV with GNSS receiver and multispectral camera
- Geoscan 401 — multirotor drone with variable payload
- Geoscan 501 — multirotor aerial survey drone
- Groza Group of Companies Slon (en Elephant) heavy‑lift quadcopter, 15 km, 30 mins, 120 kg, no fiber optic, no daughters (parasites, outriders, swarmlings, launchlings, pods, effectors, deployables, sub-UAVs, or auxillaries)
- Geran-2 - main long range drone, Ploshchad (en: [draw] box), zakhvat tseli (en: target lock/capture) avtonomnyy terminal (en: autonomous terminal), 2500 km, Shenzhen Xunlong Software Orange Pi 5 SBCs with Rockchip (& Armbian or Ubuntu linux or Windows 11) running Russian Borshch AI on the YOLO open-souce detection framework on an SD card, sold on AliExpress plus Chinese SpeedyBee F405 V4 small flight controller boards with the ArteryTek AT32 chip & Ardupilot (or iNav for return to home, Betaflight is FPV) open-source firmware, flashed into memory via Bluetooth, sold on AliExpress
- Geran-5 - Non-delta-wing airframe, 1000 km, Telefly turbojet, 90 kg warhead, 12-chan Kometa sat nav, Raspberry micro tracking
- Izdelie-545 (Product 545) — interceptor of anti-personnel drones, technically a launcher of kinetic projectiles, not a drone, so does not loiter
- Kamov Ka-137 / MBVK-137 — multipurpose unmanned helicopter complex (1998)
- Kinzhal C-UAV — main interceptor of long range drones, autonomous AI, kamikaze
- Kronstadt Grom — stealthy unmanned combat aerial vehicle, equivalent as XQ-58
- Kronstadt Molnya — smaller similar to Grom
- Kronstadt Orion Inokhodets-RU (Sirius) - medium altitude long-range reconnaissance and CUAV, comparable to RQ1, RQ3 and RQ9, ISR processing AI, target recognition, semi‑autonomous strike capability
- Kuznetsov Pustelga — mobile complexes (MC) based on autonomously piloted flying microvehicles (FMV). Three types: Alpha (31 lb), Beta (15 lb), Gamma (10 lb)
- Lavochkin La-17, target and reconnaissance UAV (1953)
- Legionnaire E33k UAV
- Luch (Design Bureau), Korsar — medium-weight reconnaissance and combat UAV
- Luch (Design Bureau), Lastochka — light-weight reconnaissance and combat UAV (2011)
- Luch (Design Bureau), Luch — medium-range reconnaissance and combat UAV
- Mikoyan Skat — stealth reconnaissance and combat UAV
- Ovod thermal imaging AI
- Parodiya, one type of decoy launched with Geran drones
- Radar-MMS BPV-500
- Skvorets-PVO interceptor, FPV, CUST-made AI, 270 km/h, variants: naval Skvorets-VMF (launched from the Katran USV) & Skvorets-Z for recon & capture
- STC Orlan-10 - light-weight reconnaissance UAV, artillery spotter, Orlan-30 has optical target tracking AI and laser‑designation automation, Leer-3 EW
- Sukhoi Zond-1 (UAV) AWACS station for intelligence, surveillance and interception project
- Sukhoi S-70 Okhotnik-B (Hunter), close to Skat and BAE and US UCAV's stealth, unveiled in 2017, autonomous flight, AI‑assisted target prioritization, AI‑enabled teaming with Su‑57, strategic UCAV
- T-4 Iskatel (Searcher) — high-tech reconnaissance portable UAV (2012)
- Tupolev Tu-123 — reconnaissance (1964)
- Tupolev Tu-141 — reconnaissance (mid-1970s)
- Tupolev Tu-143 — reconnaissance (1970s onward)
- Tupolev Ту-243 Reis-D — Unmanned tactical aerial reconnaissance, operational as of 2000
- Ushkuynik Prince Vandal of Novgorod first FO drone, July 2024
- Veter Design Bureau (ASFPV) Veterok 7 Pro — main anti-personnel, fiber optic, FPV drone, Pro stands for Ploshchad AI module, Foundation for Advanced Research Project (FPI) interact AI, 13 inches, 7 kg payload, 25 km range.
- Yakovlev ALBATROS-EXPERT — vertical start and landing remote-piloted vehicle (RPV) intended for television (infra-red vision) air reconnaissance of the underlying surface in the day-time and at night, EXPERT is the integrated system comprising three RPV, ground control station, launcher and servicing equipment.
- Yakovlev Klest — reconnaissance UAV to replace the Russian armed forces' Pchela-1s.
- Yakovlev Pchela-1T — reconnaissance UAV (1986)
- Yakovlev Voron "raven" — UCAV for long range, high speed strike capability
- Yolka (alternate spelling Elka) main interceptor of anti-personnel drones
- ZALA 421-06
- ZALA 421-08, reconnaissance mini UAV (2007)
- ZALA 421-12
- ZALA Izdeliye‑53 (Lancet successor), more powerful ARM SBC, upgraded CNN accelerator, Chinese AI SoC (Horizon Robotics / Rockchip RK3588), FPGA‑based image pipeline, neural‑net target recognition, target prioritization AI, but no swarm
- ZALA KUB‑BLA ("Kamikaze Cube"), HiSilicon Hi3516CV300, ARM Cortex‑A7 SoC, low‑power CNN accelerator (integrated in HiSilicon ISP), optional FPGA board for image preprocessing, AIVI assisted perception (not autonomous attack)
- ZALA Lancet-3, Nvidia Jetson, vision guidance with neural‑net target recognition

== Saudi Arabia ==
- Saqr 1
- Saqr 2
- Saqr 3
- Saqr 4
- PSATRI UAV

== Serbia ==
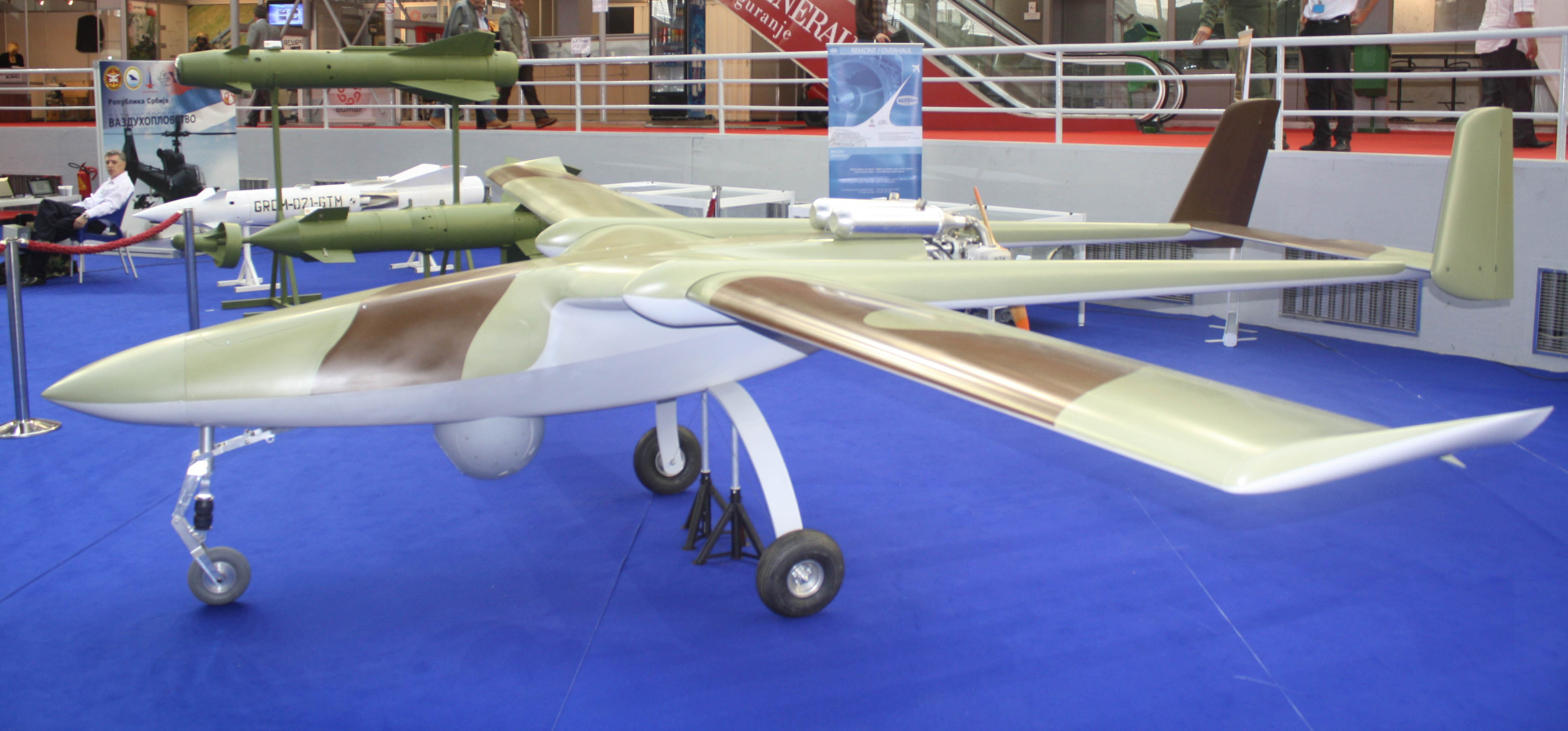
Pegaz UCAV

- Pegaz – combat drone
- Gavran 145 – loitering munition
- Osica – loitering munition
- Vrabac – reconnaissance drone

== Singapore ==
- ST Aero FanTail
- ST Aero MAV-1
- ST Aero Skyblade

== Slovenia ==
- C-Astral Aerospace Bramor ppX
- C-Astral Aerospace Bramor C4EYE ISR UAV - NATO Class I <150 kg Mini Tactical RPAS
- C-Astral Aerospace Bramor sAR
- C-Astral Aerospace Atlas C4EYE ISR UAV - NATO Class I <150 kg Mini Tactical RPAS
- C-Astral Aerospace SQA eVTOL ISR UAV

== South Africa ==
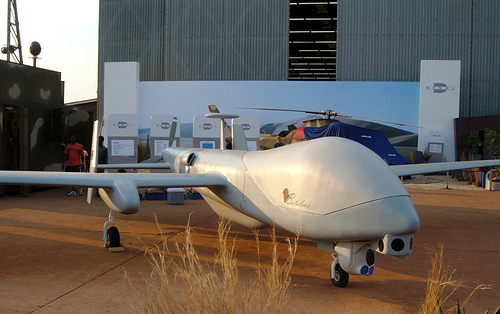
Denel Dynamics Bateleur UAV

- Denel Dynamics Seeker - Tactical reconnaissance (a light air-to-ground missile is under development for it)
- Denel Dynamics Skua - Target drone
- ATE Vulture - Artillery spotting/targeting UAV
- Denel Dynamics Bateleur - MALE reconnaissance/elint UAV
- Milkor 380 - Multi-function UAV. Achieved its maiden flight on 19 September 2023

== South Korea ==
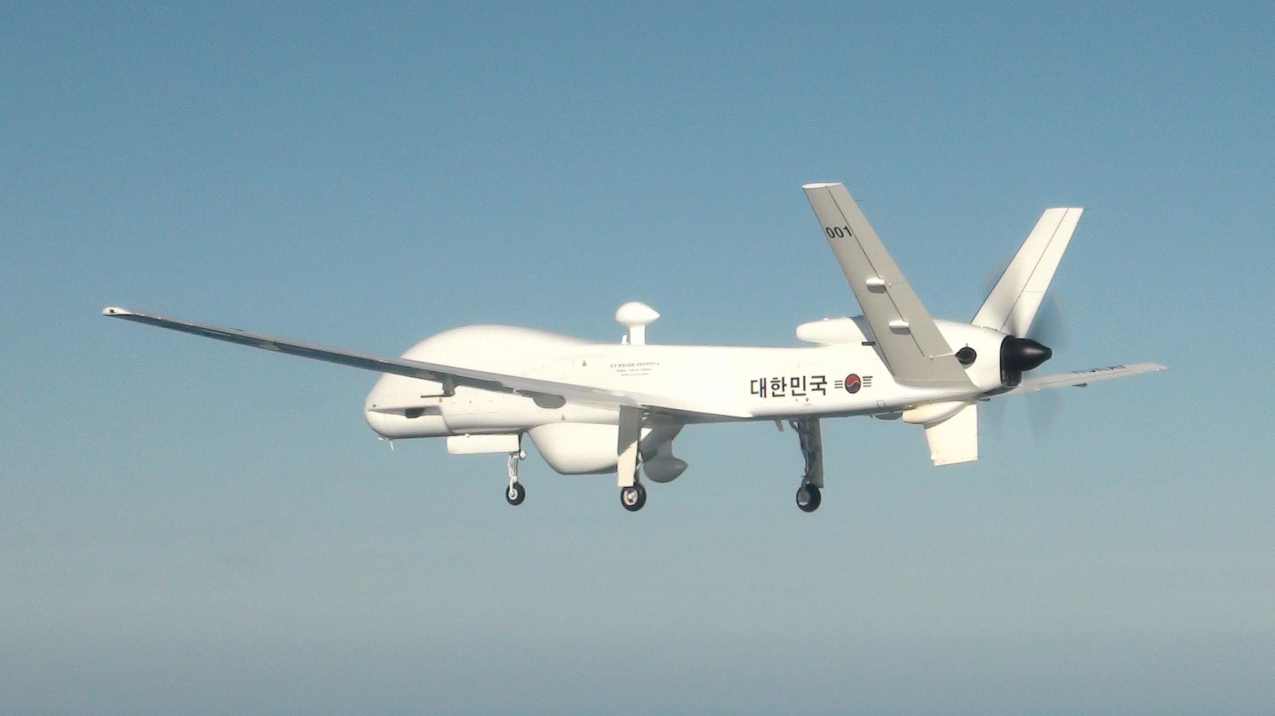
Korean Air KUS-FS

- Korea Aerospace Night Intruder NI-100N or DUV-4, medium-range tactical reconnaissance
- Korea Aerospace RQ-101, short-range for tactical reconnaissance
- Korea Aerospace RQ-102, short-range for tactical reconnaissance, target detection and target designation and combat damage assessment
- Korea Aerospace Night Intruder 600VT, VTOL (Vertical Takeoff and Landing) unmanned helicopter for reconnaissance missions
- Korean Air Aerospace KUS-7
- Korean Air Aerospace KUS-9 medium-range tactical reconnaissance
- Korean Air Aerospace KUS-FS MALE, medium-altitude, long-endurance (MALE) UAV
- Korean Air Aerospace KUS-VH, Unmanned System-Vertical Helicopter, based on MD 500 Defender
- Korean Air Aerospace KUS-FC, unmanned combat air vehicle [UCAV] with stealth capacities
- Uconsystem Remo Eye 006B
- Uconsystem Remo Eye 002B
- Uconsystem T-Rotor
- Uconsystem Drone Killer
- LIG Nex1 KCD-200 heavy-lift UAV

== Spain ==
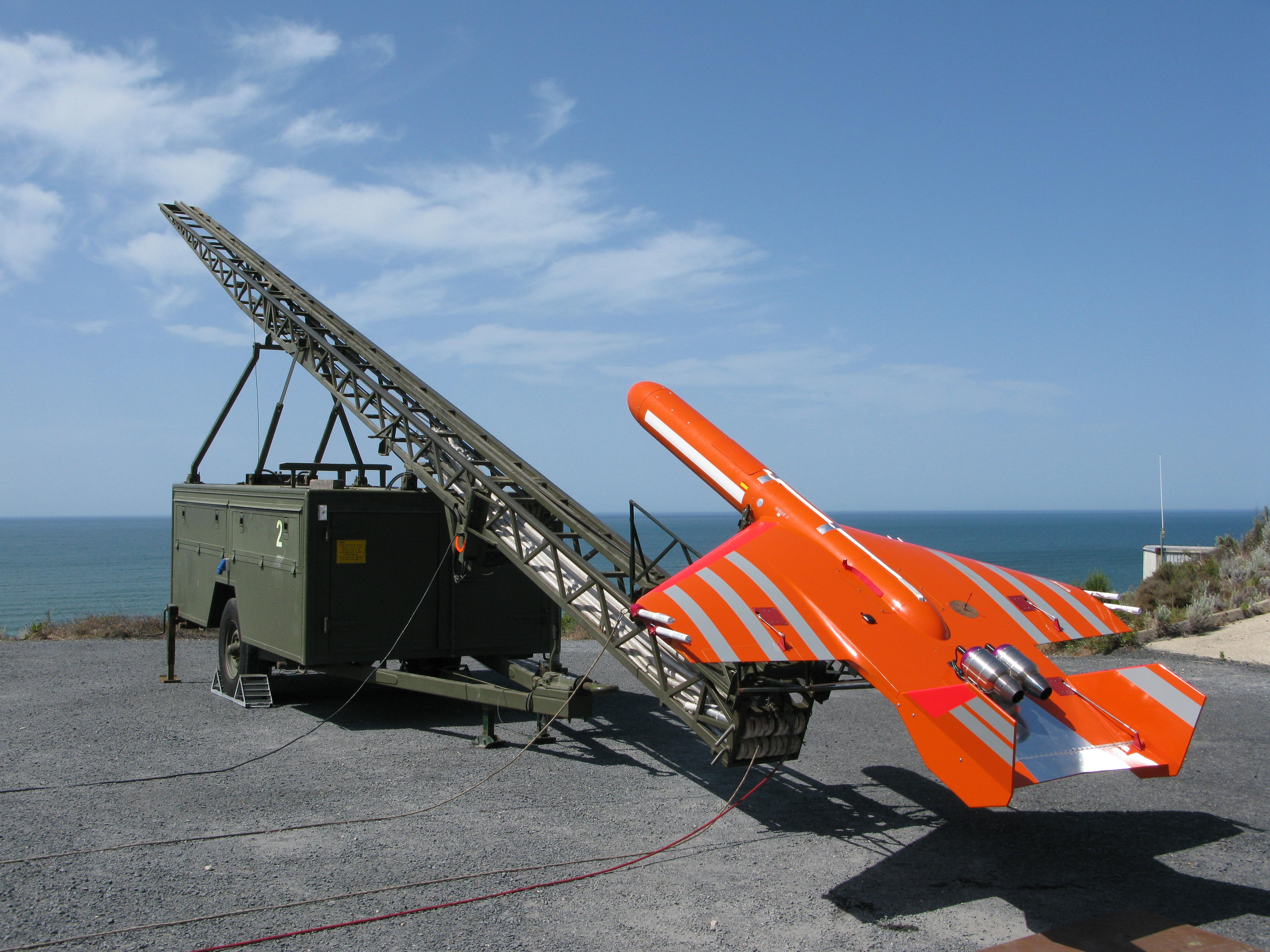
The SCRAB II ready to launch

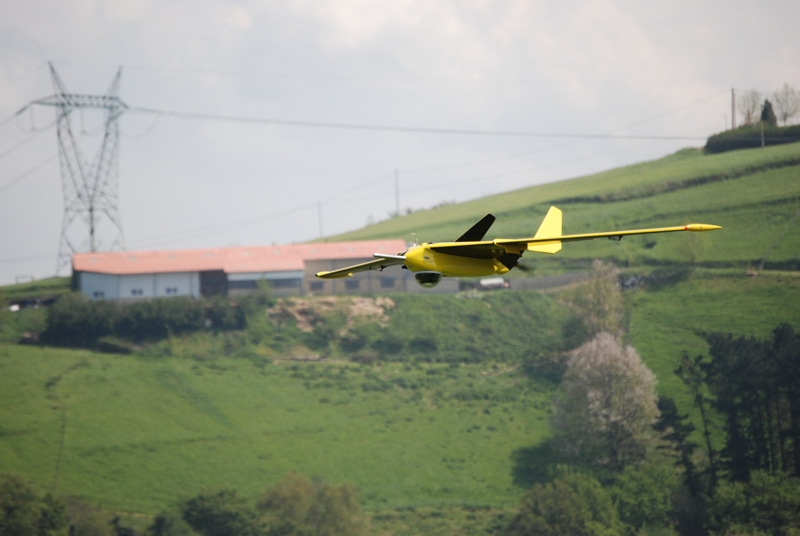
The Spanish Fulmar during a flight

- Aerial Target Light (Low Cost Target Drone)
- Aurea Avionics Seeker UAS
- CONYCA GEODRONE
- Quaternium HYBRiX.20
- Alpha Unmanned Systems SNIPER
- Aerovision Fulmar
- SIVA (Artillery Observer Plane)
- EADS Barracuda (with Germany)
- SCRAB II (Twin Turbine Target Drone)
- SCRAB I (High Portable Turbine Target Drone)
- SCR ALBA (Light and Portable Target Drone)
- Sirtap - (es:Sirtap)

== Sri Lanka ==
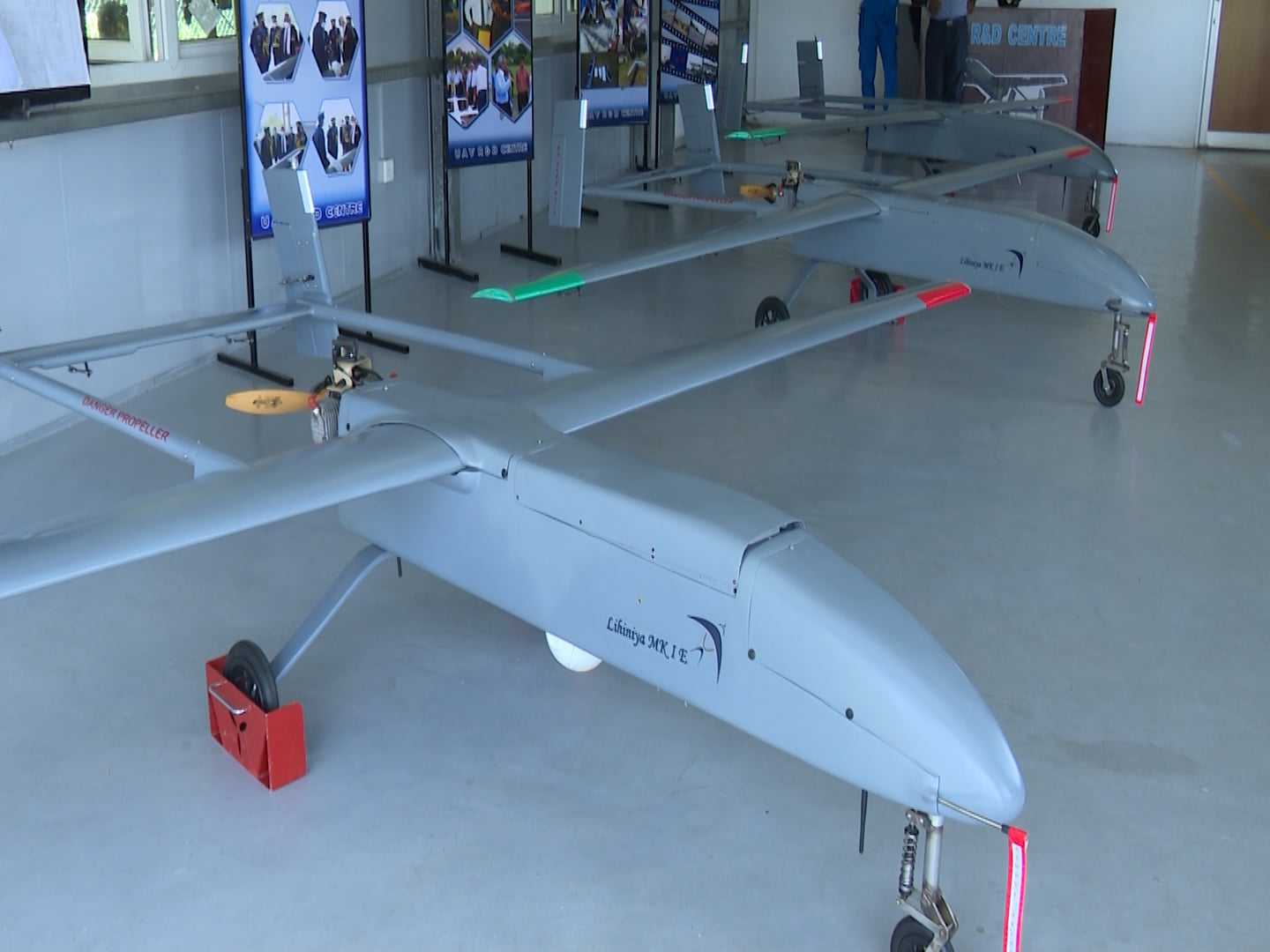
Sri Lankan UAV Lihiniya MK I

- Lihiniya MK I
- Lihiniya MK II

== Switzerland ==
- Aeroscout Scout B1-100
- Anavia HT-50
- Anavia HT-100
- Anavia HT-100 Naval
- Anavia HT-750
- Aurora Swiss Aerospace Skiron Expeditionary sUAS
- Dufour Aerospace AeroMini
- Dufour Aerospace Aero-200
- ENS Dynamics WASP Interceptor
- Helvetis – Jabali VTOL
- Helvetis – Broli
- KZD-85
- Rigitech Eiger
- RUAG Ranger
- SenseFly eBee X
- Skysec Sentinel Catch / Diehl Cicada
- Skysec Sentinel Catch & Carry
- Swiss Drones
- Swiss UAV KOAX X-240
- Swiss UAV NEO S-300
- Swiss UAV NEO S-350
- UMS Skeldar
- WingtraOne
- WingtraRAY

== Sweden ==
- SHARC
- CybAero APID 55

== Taiwan ==
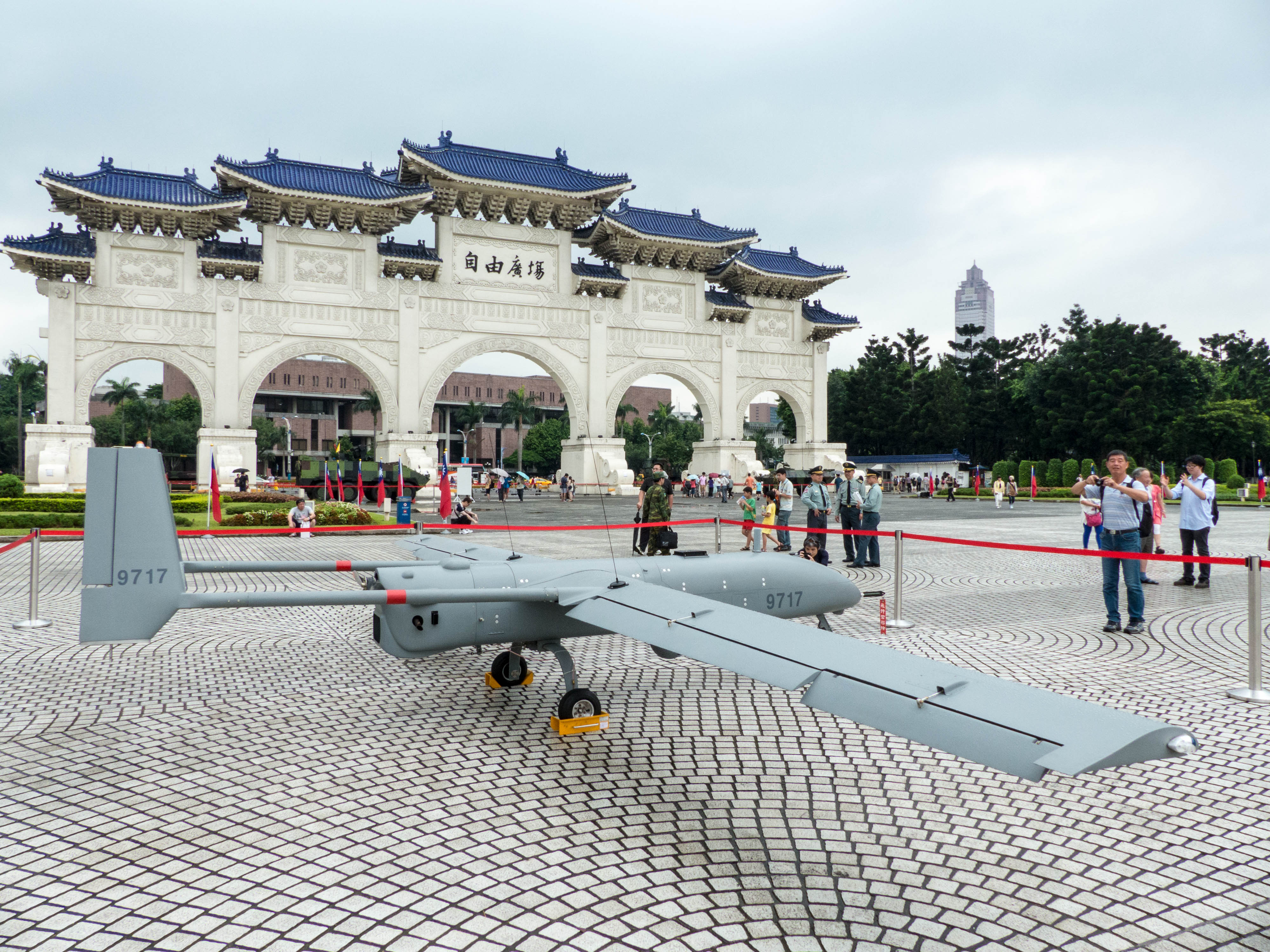
Taiwanese NCSIST Albatross on display at Chiang Kai-shek Memorial Hall

- NCSIST Albatross
- NCSIST Cardinal I
- NCSIST Cardinal II
- NCSIST Fire Cardinal
- NCSIST Chien Hsiang
- NCSIST Teng Yun

== Thailand ==
- AeroVironment RQ-11 Raven (with US)
- Black Kite UAV
- IAI Searcher (with Israel)

== Tunisia ==
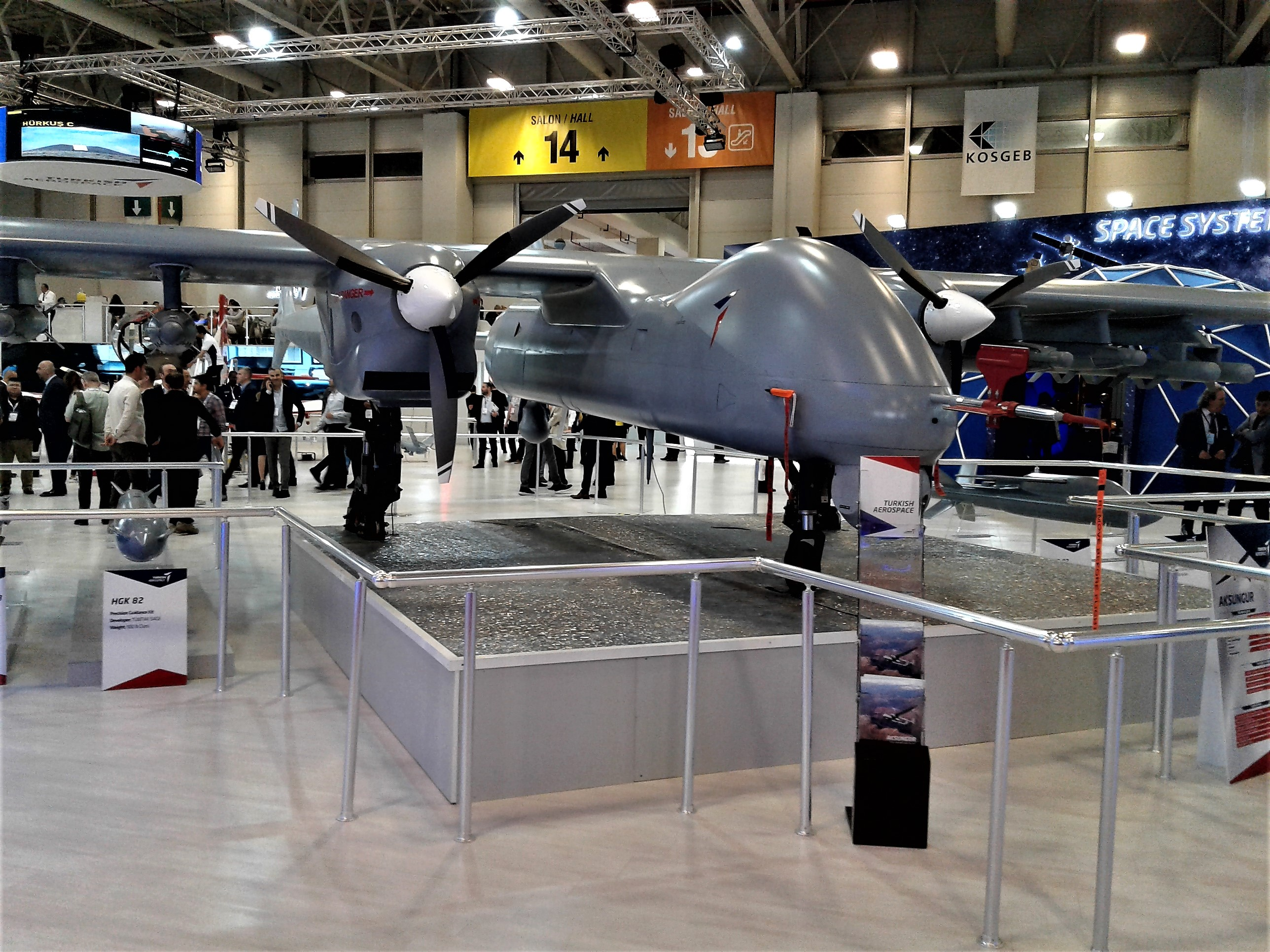
High payload capacity UAV TAI Aksungur

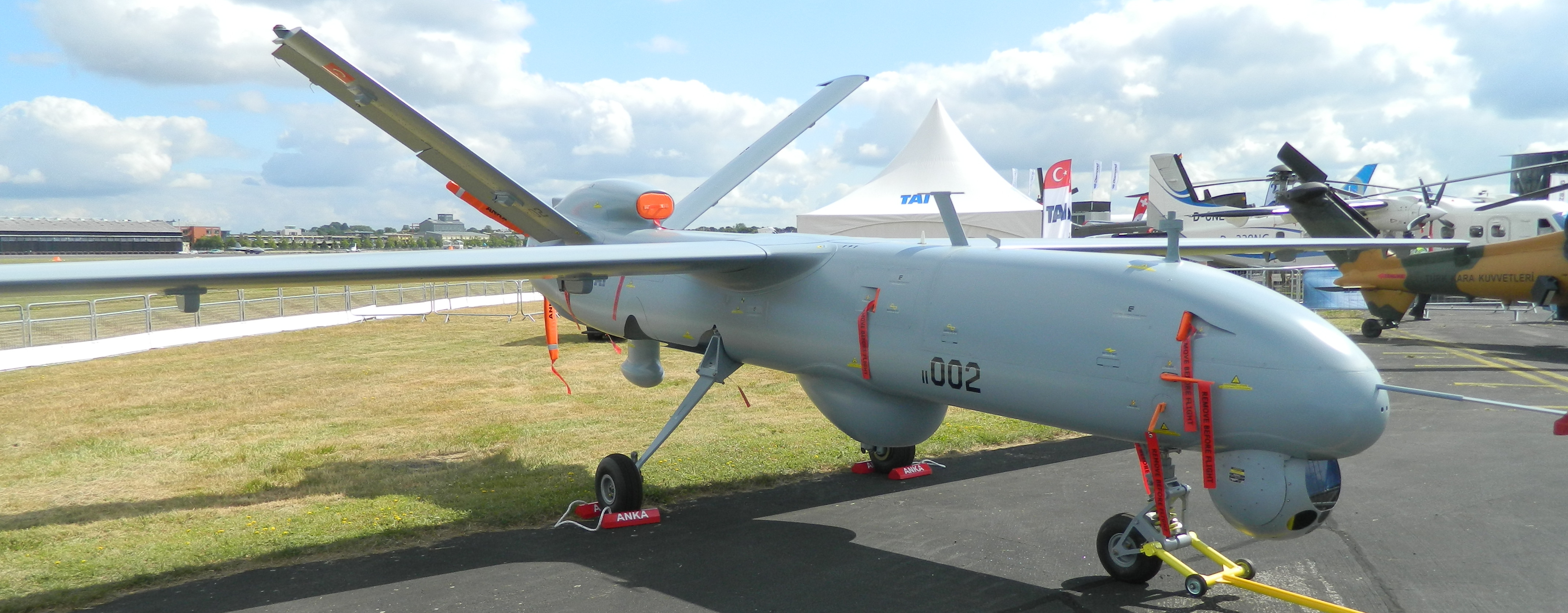
TAI Anka

- TATI Nasnas MK1

== Turkey ==
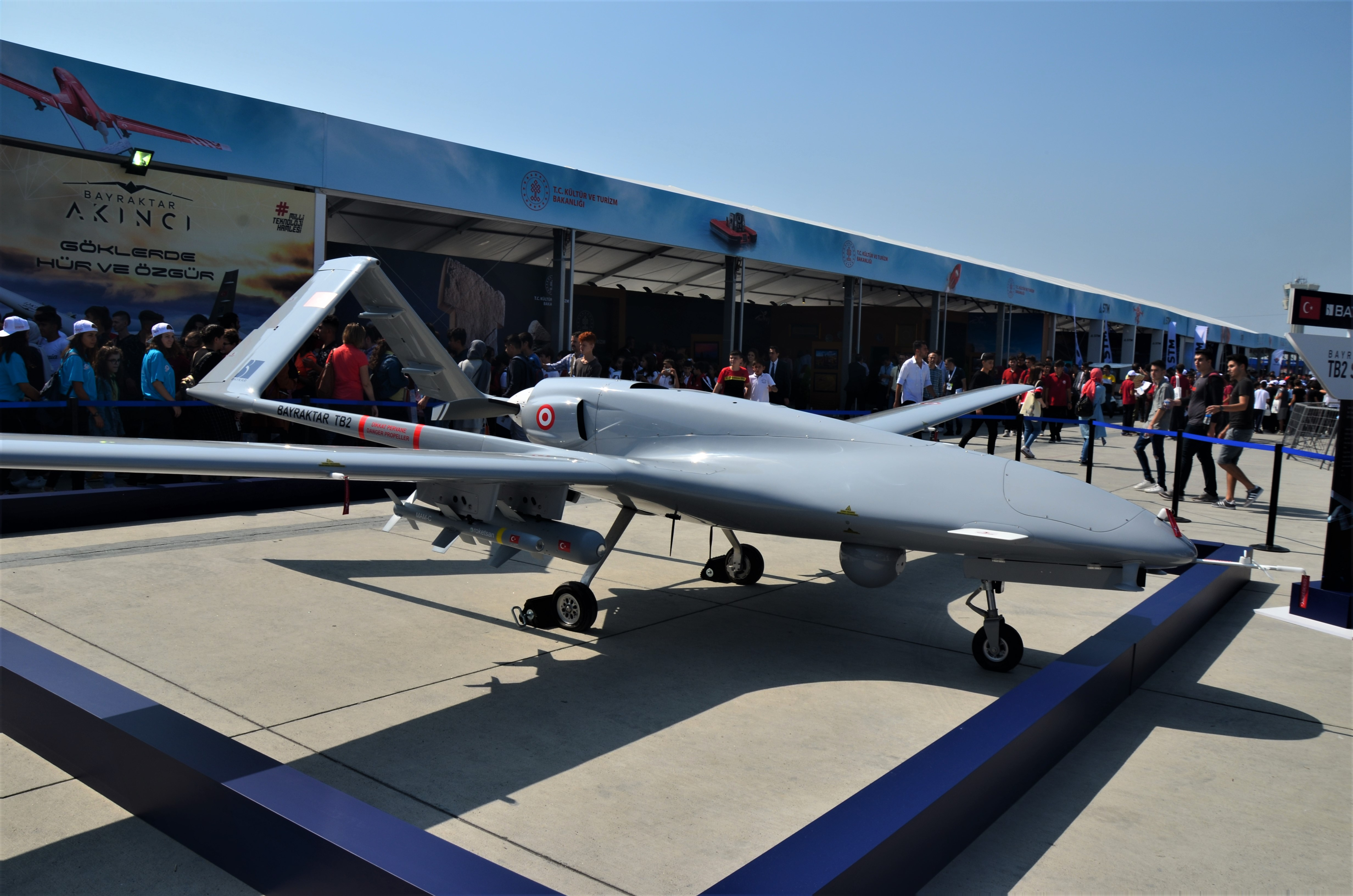
Bayraktar TB2 UCAV

- ASİSGUARD SARGUT
- Asisguard Songar
- Aselsan ARI-1T rotary-wing
- Atlantis AeroSeeker 405
- Bayraktar Akıncı, UCAV under development
- Bayraktar Mini UAV (Reconnaissance)
- Bayraktar Kızılelma (UCAV under development)
- Bayraktar Tactical UAV (Reconnaissance and surveillance)
- Bayraktar TB2 UCAV
- Bayraktar TB3 UCAV
- Bayraktar VTOL
- Baykar Malazgirt Mini VTOL (Reconnaissance and surveillance)
- EES Doğan stratejik İHA sistem Stratejik İHA Sistemi
- EES Kırlangıç taktik İHA sistem Taktik İHA Sistemi
- UAVERA Çağatay CGT50 VTOL UAS used by General Directorate of Security (Turkey)
- Globiha Mini UAV
- Havelsan BAHA,
- Havelsan Bulut,
- LAPİS ULAK VTL 02 - VTOL Armed UAV integrated with TUBITAK-SAGE TOGAN - Air-to-surface launched 81 mm mortar munition
- Otonom Teknoloji Doruk-101A Aerostat System
- Poyraz (Intelligent and Country Security Drone)
- SE Defense and Aviation Albatross VTOL UAV
- STM Kargu
- TAI Aksungur
- TAI Göksungur
- TAI Anka-A (MALE) UAV
- TAI Anka-B (MALE) UCAV
- TAI Anka-3
- TAI Baykuş
- TAI Gözcü (Short-range tactical reconnaissance, surveillance, target acquisition)
- TAI Keklik
- TAI Martı
- TAI Pelikan (Reconnaissance, surveillance, target acquisition)
- TAI R-300 R-İHA UAV
- TAI Şimşek (Turbojet powered, high-speed aerial target drone, threat simulator)
- TAI Sivrisinek R-İHA UAV
- TAI Turna-G (Turboprop powered, medium-speed target drone)
- Talay UAV
- Vestel Arı
- Vestel Efe
- Vestel Ege
- Vestel Karayel (Tactical UAV/UCAV)

== Ukraine ==
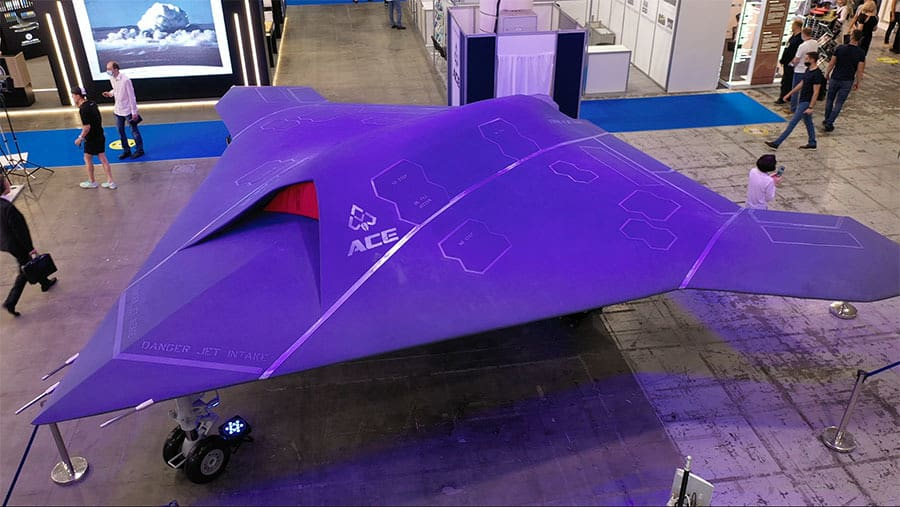
ACE One (UCAV)

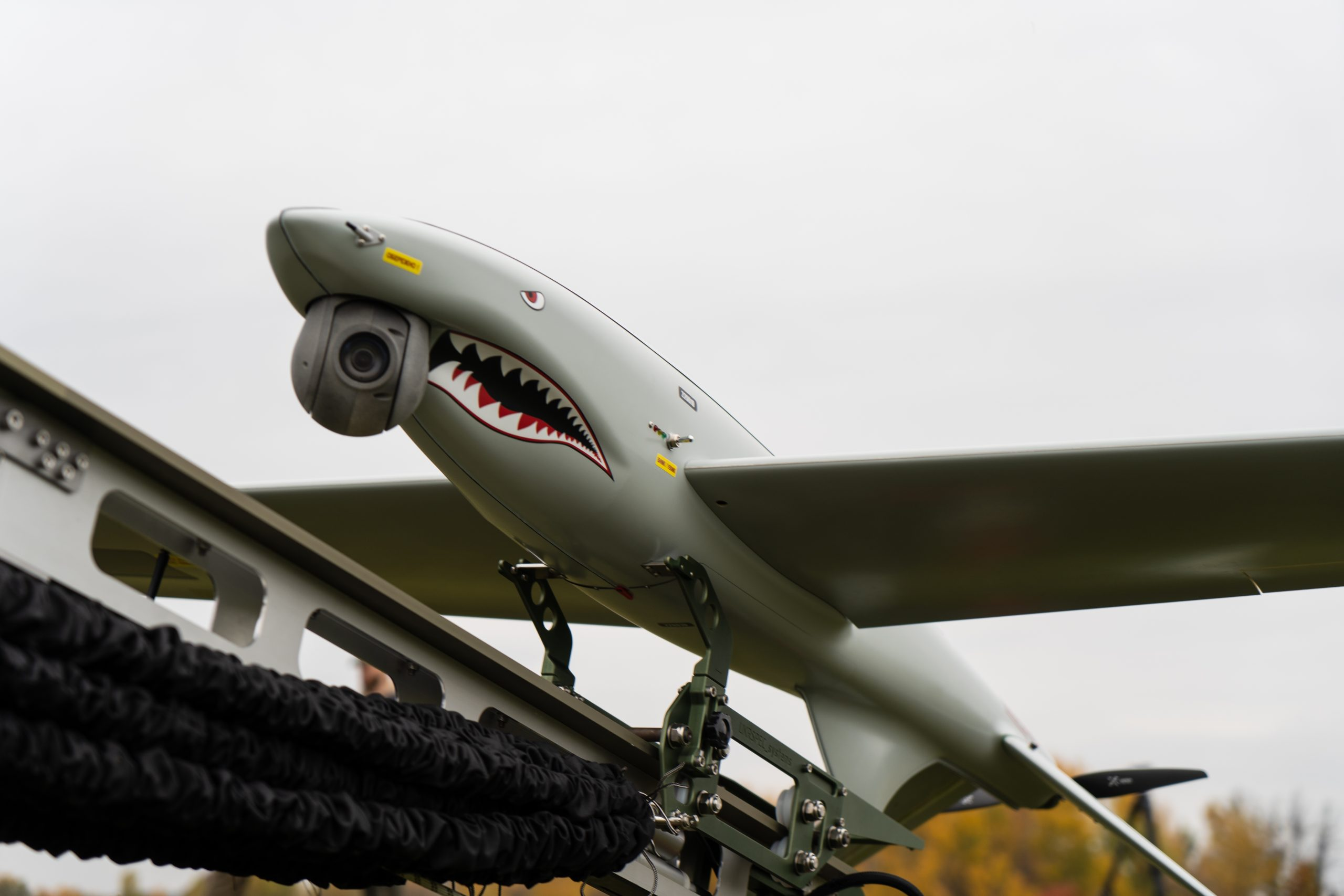
Shark UAV

D1L-Duck

- A1-CM Furia
- ACE One (Stealth UCAV)
- Aerorozvidka R12 quadcopter, 4 daughters, phased out years ago
- Aerorozvidka R18 octocopter, 4 km due to comms module, no double coil spec or daughters
- Bullet
- Bober (drone)
- D1L-Duck
- General Cherry AIR Pro main interceptor of anti-personnel drones, autonomous AI, not coil-fed, Claymore-style directional fragmentation charge, 35 minute loiter
- Dovbush T10 50 km dual coil, main long range anti-personnel mothership
- First Contact Osa
- Horlytsia
- Jedi Shahed Hunter
- Leleka-100
- An-196 Liutyi main long range drone, 800 km
- OSIRIS UEB-1
- ODIN (miltech project) Win_Hit
- Ptashka (en: little bird) Variants: 5, 7 inch & long range bomber, FPV
- PD-1
- PD-2
- Punisher (drone)
- RAM and RAM II UAV loitering munitions (based on the Leleka-100)
- Raybird-3
- SkyFall Vampire heavy-lift hexacopter, 6 daughters, Krashukha-4 defeats L3Harris Technologies small box EP module which runs Widow® Mission Management System software, but its hopping isn't fast enough, so fiber optic
- Sokil-300
- Shark (drone)
- Strategy Force Solution GOGOL-M long range, 300km, 2 daughters, Smart Pilot AI
- Swarmer makes the Styx AI swarm engine which clears a grid by recon calculating how bombers divvy up the personnel. (In Ukraine, typical deployments are 3 drones, one for recon and two bombers that carry 25 bombs each, but max swarms are 690 drones.)
- Ukrainian Special Military Technologies (USMT) Hunter D-15 BOMBER ELRS (Express Long Range System) open-source Radio Control (RC with 50 km+ range) hopping link, 5 kg candy bar warhead
- Ukrspecsystems Octopus-100 C-UAS AI vision
- Vyriy Industries (en: swarm) Vyriy-10-TFL-1 (AFU reporting name: Molfar), Skynode S final mile AI module, main anti-personnel, fiber optic, FPV, 10 inches, 4 kg payload, 25 km range
- Wild Hornets Sting main interceptor of long range drones, electro-optical sensors autonomous AI, Claymore-style directional fragmentation charge

== United Arab Emirates ==
- Adcom Systems Yabhon
  - Yabhon United 40

== United Kingdom ==
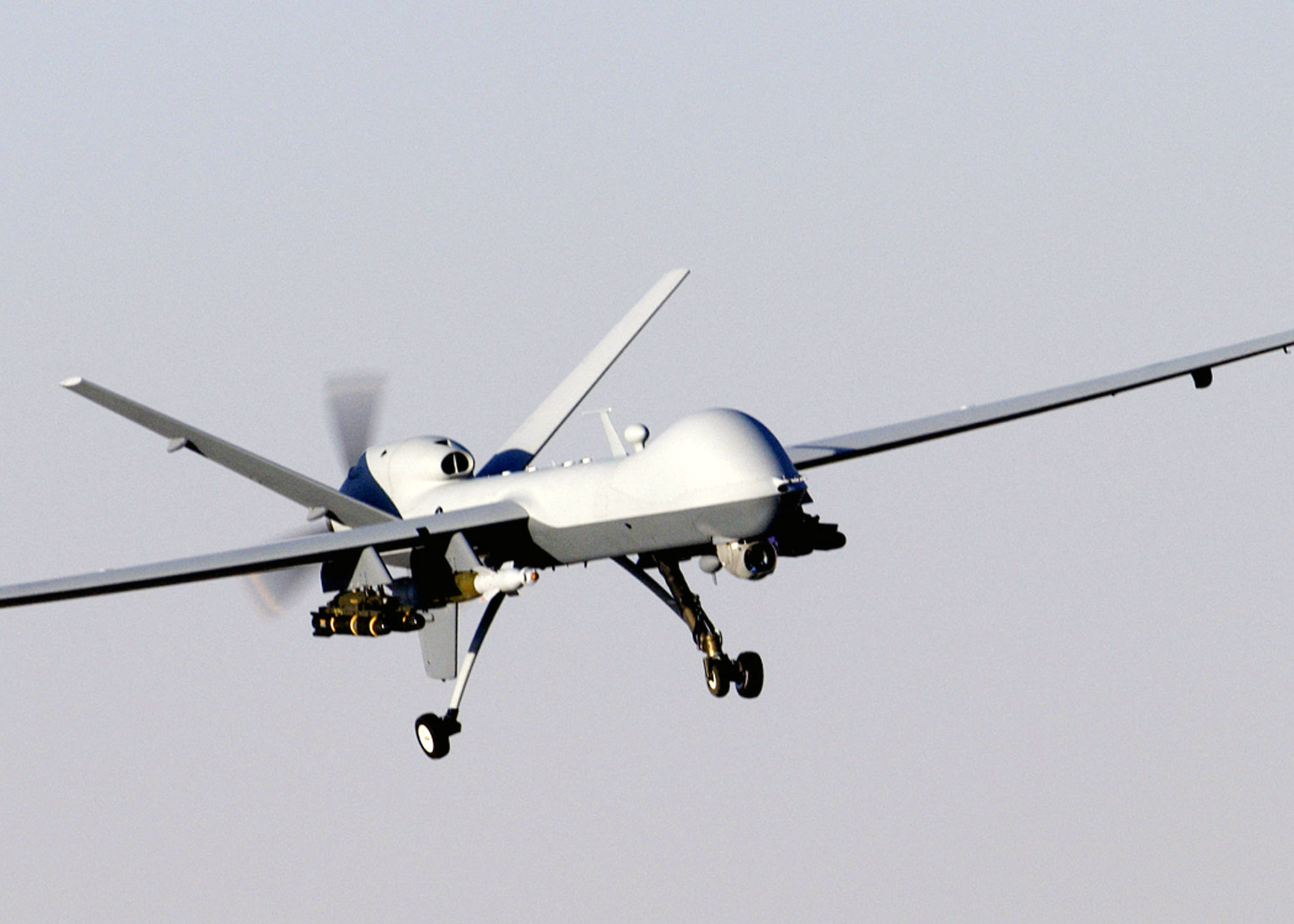
RAF MQ-9 Reaper

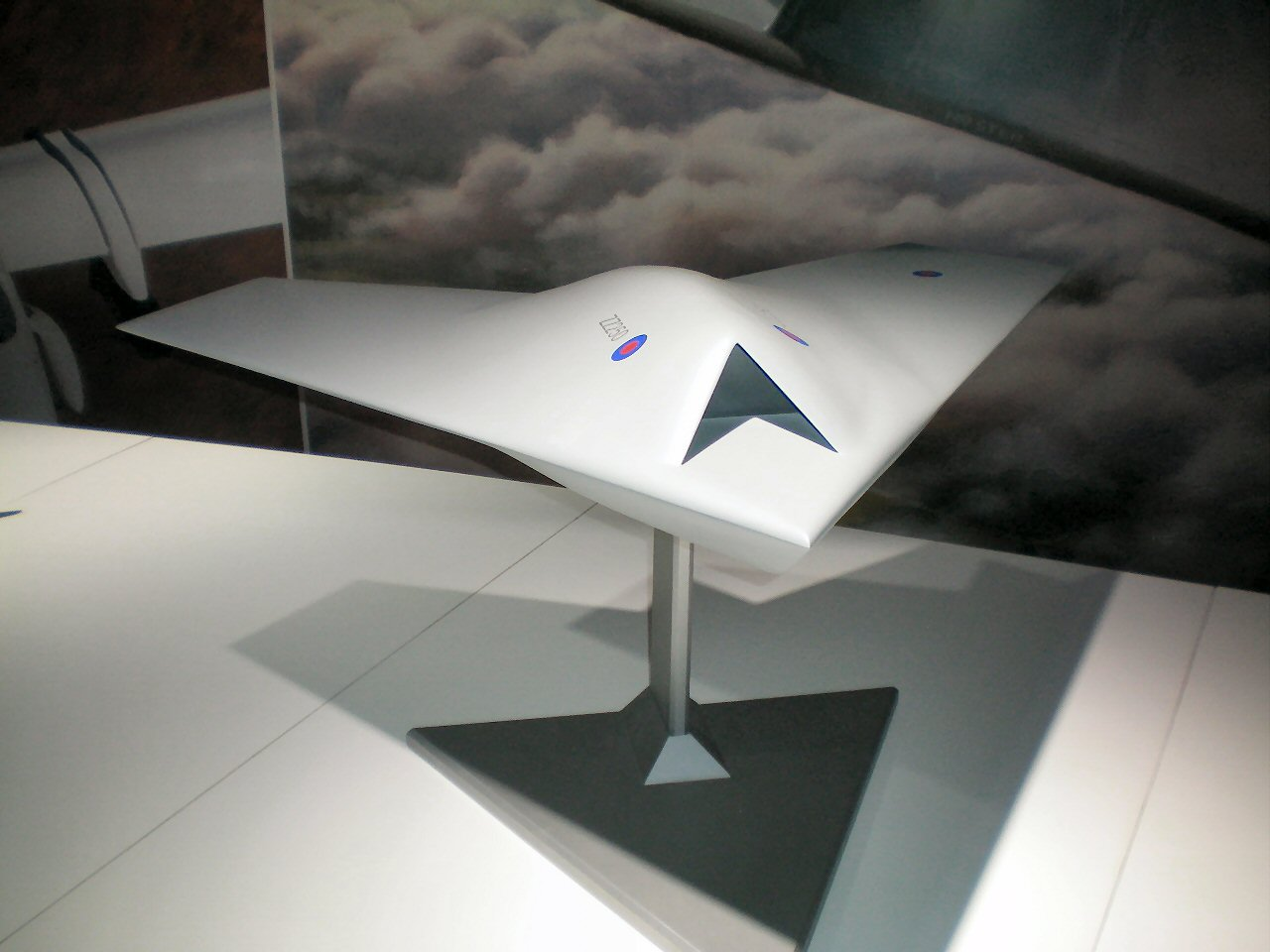
BAE Taranis

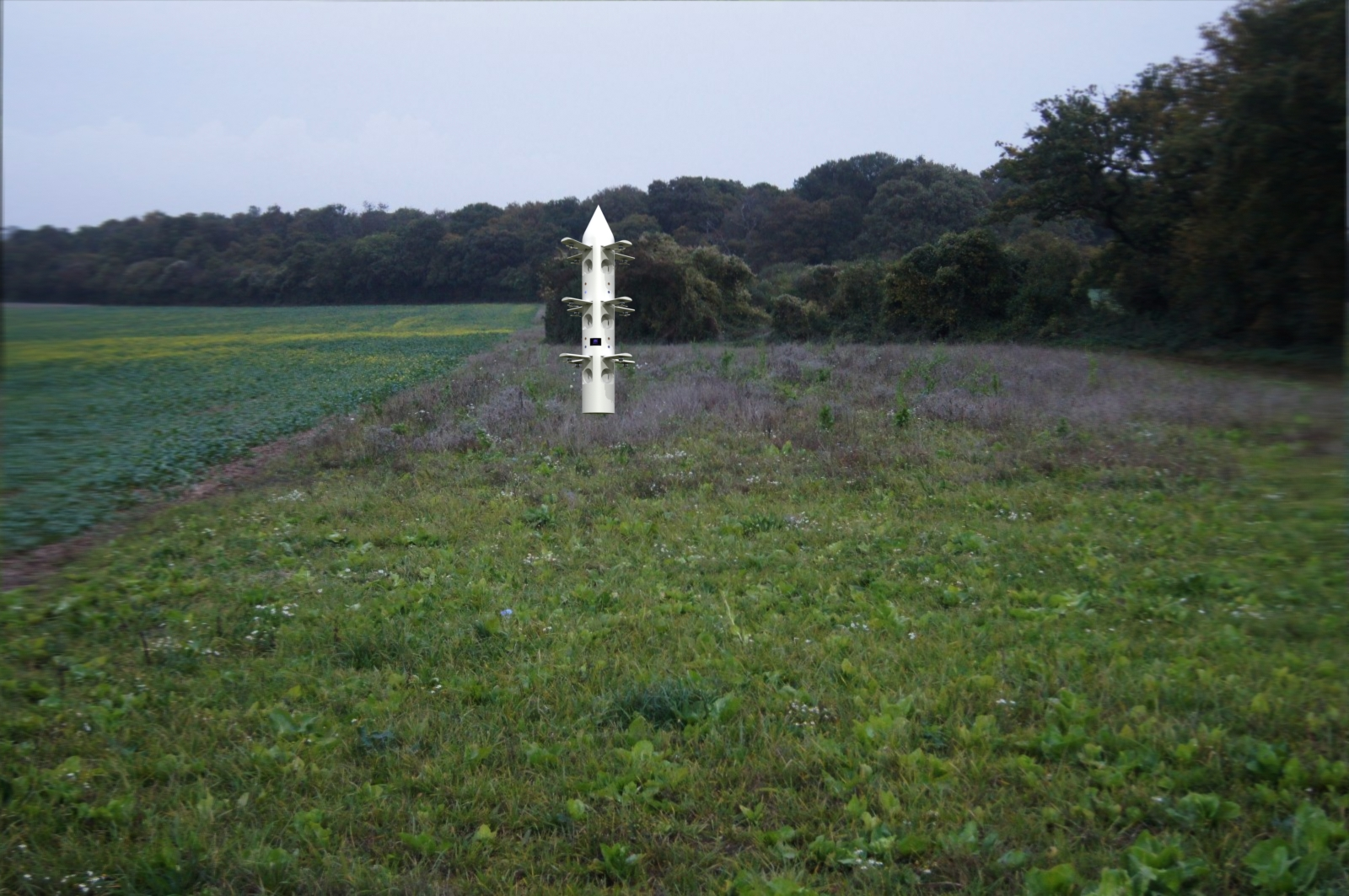
An EMC Operations Dimorphodon Hovering

- Aesir Hoder
- Airspeed Queen Wasp (1936)
- ArduCopter
- BAE Systems Ampersand, reconnaissance (2008)
- BAE Systems Corax, research (2004)
- BAE Systems Fury, reconnaissance/attack (2008)
- BAE Systems GA22
- BAE Systems HERTI, reconnaissance (2004)
- BAE Systems Mantis, research, (planned)
- BAE Systems Skylynx II, reconnaissance (2006)
- BAE Systems Taranis, research (planned)
- BAE Systems Magma, blown air research platform.
- BAE Systems Demon, based on a BAE Eclipse drone
- BAE Systems Phoenix, reconnaissance (1986)
- BAE Systems PHASA-35
- de Havilland Queen Bee (1930s) - gunnery target
- English Electric Canberra U Mk.10
- EMC Operations Dimorphodon, dormancy and constriction UAS.
- Fairey Queen (1930s) - gunnery target
- Gem-7, medium weight, long endurance UAV.
- Gloster Meteor, U Mk.15, U Mk.16 and U Mk.21 - conversion to target drone
- Miles Queen Martinet (1940s)
- ML Aviation Pilotless Target (1950s) - to MoS specification U120D, using the motorcycle-derived Vincent Picador engine.
- ML Aviation Sprite (1981) - "Surveillance Patrol Reconnaissance Intelligence Target Designation Electronic Warfare "
- Novel Air Concept, research, (under construction)
- Prioria Robotics Maveric
- QinetiQ Banshee, formerly Target Technology Ltd, then Meggitt, Banshee - target drone, and reconnaissance (1984–present)
- QinetiQ Mercator, research (in development)
- QinetiQ Zephyr, high-altitude long-endurance (in development)
- RAE LARYNX (1927–1929) - guided anti-ship weapon
- R.F.C. 1917 Aerial Target The first drone aircraft
- Short Skyspy - ducted fan for urban reconnaissance
- Singular Aircraft SA03 (UK/Spain)
- Thales Watchkeeper WK450, reconnaissance (2005)
- UB.109T (1950s) - project for long range unpiloted bomb
- UTSL MSAT-500 NG drone for range practise, missile and gunnery. In service (1995).
- Westland Mote - experimental unmanned observation helicopter 1975
- Westland Wisp - experimental unmanned coaxial helicopter for urban reconnaissance 1976
- Westland Wideye - experimental unmanned observation helicopter 1977

== United States ==
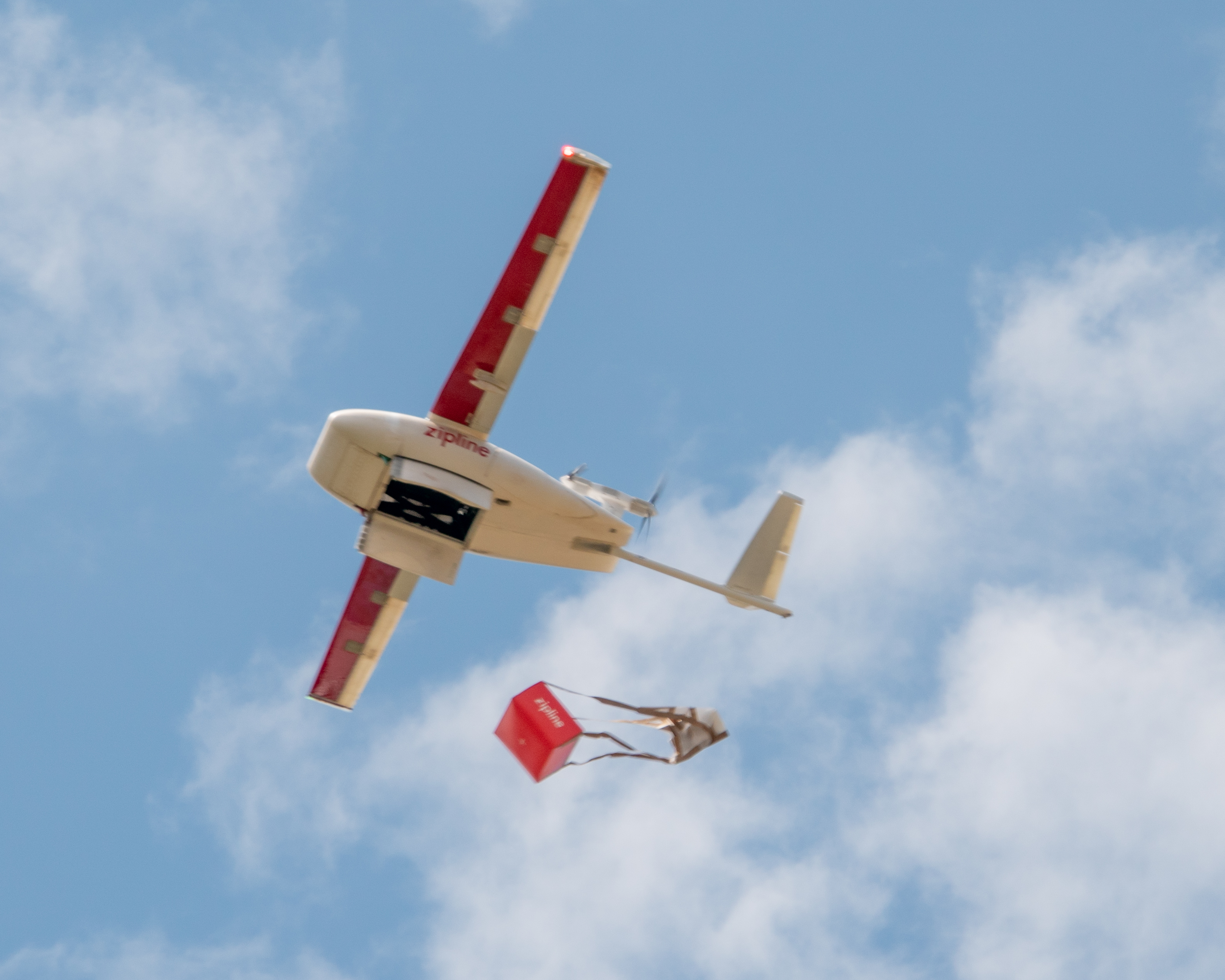
Zipline delivery drone

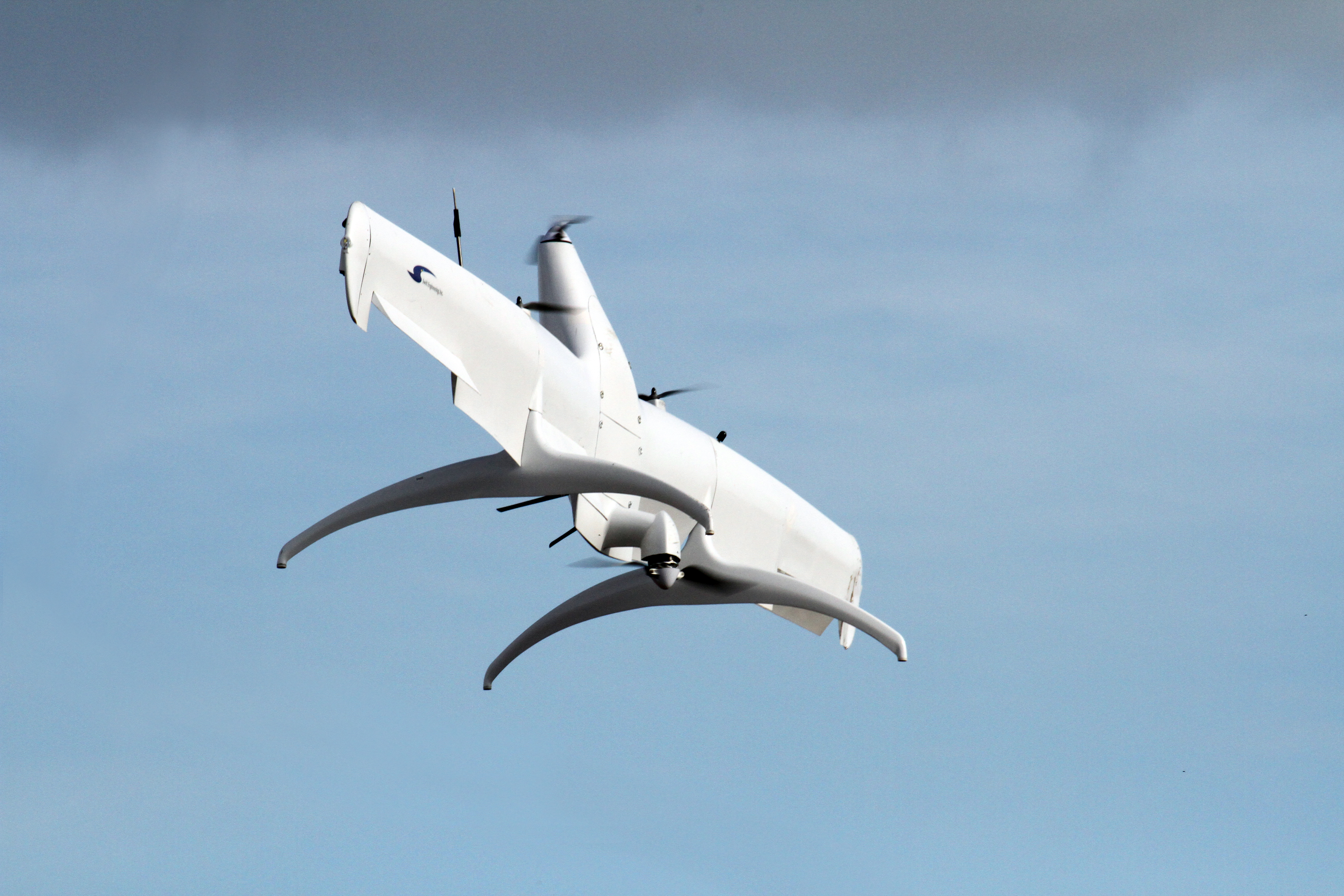
Swift020/021 (スウィフト020/021)

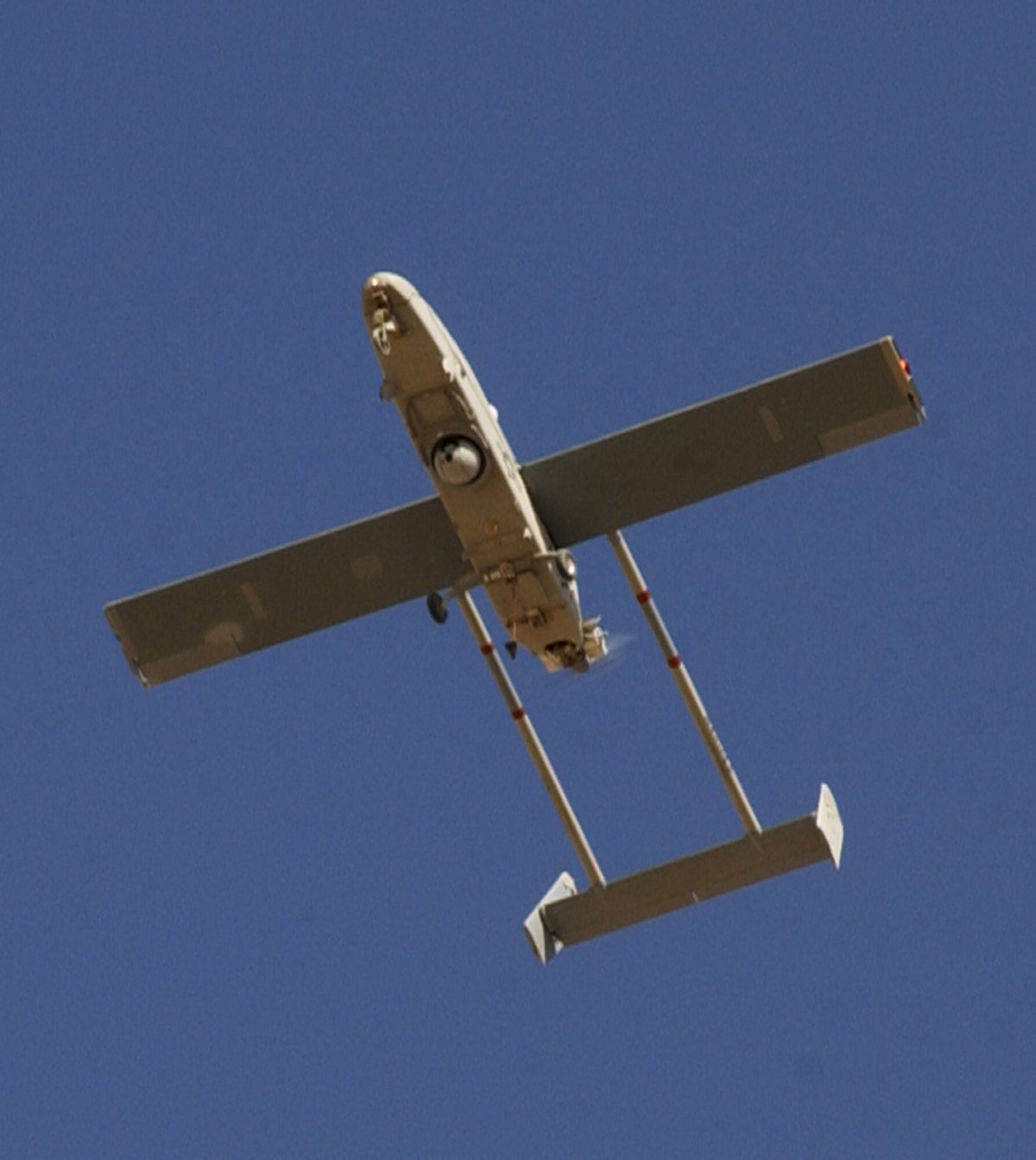
AAI Pioneer UAV flying over Iraq

- AAI RQ-2 Pioneer, reconnaissance (1986)
- AAI RQ-7 Shadow, reconnaissance (1999)
- AIRS Seeker Wing
- Aerojet General MQM-58 Overseer
- Aerojet AN/USD-2
- Aerojet SD-2
- Aero Telemetry H-1 Racer, Commercial, medium endurance, for Hollywood Film Use (2003)
- Aero Telemetry XF-11, Commercial, medium endurance, for Hollywood Film Use (2003)
- Aero Telemetry H-4 Hercules, Commercial for Hollywood Film Use (2003)
- AeroVironment FQM-151 Pointer
- AeroVironment RQ-11 Raven, reconnaissance (2005)
- AeroVironment RQ-14 Dragon Eye, reconnaissance (2002)
- AeroVironment RQ-20 Puma, reconnaissance (2007)
- AeroVironment Nano Hummingbird
- AeroVironment SkyTote
- AeroVironment Switchblade-600, Replicator funded
- AeroVironment Wasp III, reconnaissance (2001)
- Alliant RQ-6 Outrider, reconnaissance (1996)
- American Dynamics AD-150, reconnaissance, attack
- Anduril ALTIUS™-600M (not in the database of USPTO Tess, WIPO, Madrid or Rospatent FIPS), Lattice network (operator makes 4 decisions), DARPA Autonomous Multi‑Domain Adaptive Swarms‑of‑Swarms (AMASS) AI, not an interceptor, tube‑launched, Air-Launched Effects (ALE), 4 hrs, 280 mi (450 km), 90 mph, 7kg warhead, DARPA Offensive Swarm‑Enabled Tactics (OFFSET) testbed, Replicator funded
- Anduril Bolt-M, Lattice Machine Learning (ML) target tracking AI, kamikaze option, not an interceptor, man portable, VTOL, 40 mins, 20 km, 85 mph, 2 kg warhead
- Anduril Ghost-X SOCOM
- Anduril FQ-44 Fury, Collaborative Combat Aircraft (CCA), Replicator funded
- Applied Aeronautics Albatross UAV
- AQM-127 SLAT
- AQM-128
- Arcturus T-20, reconnaissance, attack (2009)
- ASSET (spacecraft)
- ATAIR Insect
- ATAIR LEAPP
- ATAIR Micro LEAPP
- AutoCopter
- AUM-N-2 Petrel
- Aurora Goldeneye
- Aurora Flight Sciences Orion
- Auterion GS (San Diego County) quadcopter (custom test), Kraken Kinetics miniturized Explosively Formed Penetrator (EFP)
- BAE Systems Silver Fox
- BAE Systems SkyEye (with the United Kingdom), reconnaissance (1973)
- BAE Systems Skylynx II
- BAI BQM-147 Dragon reconnaissance (1986)
- Beechcraft AQM-37A
- Beechcraft Model 1019 Designated AQM-37A by the United States Military
- Beechcraft Model 1025 Cardinal
- Beechcraft Model Model 1072 United Kingdom variant, modified by Short Brothers as the Short Stiletto to meet British requirements.
- Beechcraft Model Model 1088 Italian variant
- Beechcraft Model Model 1094
- Beechcraft KD2B-1
- Beechcraft Q-12
- Beechcraft AQM-37 Jayhawk, target (1961)
- Beechcraft MQM-61 Cardinal
- Beechcraft MQM-61A Cardinal, target (1959)
- Beechcraft MQM-107 Streaker (1974)
- Bell Eagle Eye, tiltrotor reconnaissance (1998) (cancelled)
- Boeing A160 Hummingbird, research (2005)
- Boeing CQM-121 Pave Tiger, anti-radar drone (1983)
- Boeing Condor, reconnaissance (1988)
- Boeing Dominator, experimental (2007) -Persistent Munition Technology Demonstrator-
- Boeing HALE Under development
- Boeing Insitu RQ-21 Blackjack
- Boeing Phantom Eye, reconnaissance (2011)
- Boeing Phantom Ray
- Boeing Insitu ScanEagle, reconnaissance (2004)
- Boeing SolarEagle
- Boeing X-37
- Boeing X-45, research (2002)
- Boeing X-46, research (2003)
- Boeing X-48
- Boeing X-50, research (2003)
- Boeing X-51
- Boeing YQM-94A Compass Cope B, reconnaissance (1973)
- BQM-90, target (1970)
- Brunswick-Balke-Collender OQ-4
- Chance-Vought KD2U-1 Regulus II
- Composite Engineering BQM-167 Streaker, in development (2006)
- Composite Engineering MQM-107 Streaker
- Cornelius XBG-3
- Culver PQ-8
- Culver PQ-10
- Culver PQ-14 Cadet
- Culver XPQ-15
- Culver Q-8
- Culver TDC
- Culver TD2C
- Culver TD3C
- Culver Model V, TD4C
- Curtiss KD2C Skeet
- Curtiss TDU-12/B Skydart
- Cyber Defence CyberScout
- DARPA-USN Tactically Exploited Reconnaissance Node ISR UAV
- DARPA Vulture, under development
- DRS RQ-15 Neptune, naval reconnaissance (2002)
- DRS Sentry HP
- DSI/NASA Oblique Wing RPV
- Excalibur unmanned aerial vehicle
- Fairchild SM-73 Bull Goose (WS-123A Goose)
- Facebook Aquila
- Fairchild BQ-3
- Fairchild SD-5 Osprey
- Fleetwings BQ-1
- Fleetwings BQ-2
- Fleetwings PQ-12
- Fletcher FBT-2
- Freefly Systems ALTA, aerial cinematography
- Freewing Scorpion
- General Atomics ALTUS, research (1996)
- General Atomics Avenger, reconnaissance, attack (2009)
- General Atomics Gnat-750, reconnaissance (1989)
- General Atomics MQ-1 Predator
- General Atomics MQ-1C Grey Eagle, air attack (2009)
- General Atomics MQ-9 Reaper, reconnaissance, air attack (2006)
- General Atomics MQ-20ER Avenger, Shield Hivemind AI, "loyal wingman" swarm control, retractable EO/IR, RCS, FL50, 20 hrs, 400 mph, 8000 mi, stealthy internal bay & S‑shaped exhaust, 3500 lb conventional
- General Atomics RQ-1 Predator, reconnaissance, combat (1995)
- General Atomics YFQ-42
- General Atomics XQ-67A, under development
- Global Observer, under development
- Globe KD2G Firefly, target (1946)
- Globe KD4G Quail, target (1949)
- Globe KD5G, target (1949)
- Globe KD6G Firefly, target (1951)
- Globe KDG Snipe, target (1946)
- Gorgon (missile family)
- Griffon Outlaw
- Griffon Outlaw G2
- Griffon Outlaw Seahunter
- Guardian UAV
- Gyrodyne QH-50 DASH or Drone Anti-Submarine Helicopter
- Hewitt-Sperry Automatic Airplane, weapon (1917)
- Honeywell RQ-16 T-Hawk, reconnaissance (2006)
- IAI RQ-5 Hunter, reconnaissance (1999)
- Imaging 1 micro UAV
- Insectothopter
- Interstate TDR
- Interstate XBDR
- Insitu Aerosonde
- KQ-X
- Krypton K1, SAR, reconnaissance
- Kettering Bug, weapon (1918)
- Kratos XQ-58 Valkyrie
- Lethal Miniature Aerial Missile System
- Lockheed AQM-60 Kingfisher
- Lockheed D-21, reconnaissance (1964)
- Lockheed Indago 3
- Lockheed Martin Desert Hawk, reconnaissance (2001)
- Lockheed Martin Desert Hawk III
- Lockheed Martin MPUAV Cormorant (cancelled)
- Lockheed Martin P-175 Polecat, research (2006)
- Lockheed Martin RQ-170 Sentinel, reconnaissance (2009)
- Lockheed Martin RQ-3 DarkStar, research (1996)
- Lockheed Martin Sea Ghost
- Lockheed Martin Stalker
- Lockheed Martin X-44 (UAV)
- Lockheed Martin X-56
- Lockheed MQM-105 Aquila experimental Lockheed UAV, early 1980s
- Lockheed Aequare
- LTV XQM-93
- MA-31
- Marcus UAV Devil Ray
- Martin X-23 PRIME
- Martin Marietta Model 845
- McDonnell KDD, TD2D Katydid
- McDonnell KSD Gargoyle
- McDonnell ADM-20 Quail, decoy (1958)
- McDonnell Douglas X-36
- MMIST CQ-10 Snowgoose, cargo (2005)
- MQ-25 Stingray
- MTC MQ-17 SpyHawk
- Nano Hummingbird, surveillance and reconnaissance (2011)
- NASA Advanced Soaring Concepts Apex research (cancelled before first flight, 1999)
- NASA Centurion
- NASA GL-10 Greased Lightning
- NASA Helios
- NASA Hyper III
- NASA Mini-Sniffer, research (1975 to 1982)
- NASA Pathfinder, research (2001)
- NASA Mars Helicopter Ingenuity (2021 to 2024), a mini-helicopter to scout routes for the Perseverance rover on Mars
- Naval Aircraft Factory TDN
- Naval Research Laboratory Flyrt
- North American X-10, research (1953)
- North American MQM-42 Redhead-Roadrunner
- Northrop RP-71
- Northrop RP-76
- Northrop AQM-35, target (1956)
- Northrop AQM-38, target (1959)
- Northrop BQM-74A Chukar, target, decoy (1964)
- Northrop GAM-67 Crossbow, multi-role (1956)
- Northrop MQM-74A Chukar, target, decoy (1964)
- Northrop Grumman MQ-8 Fire Scout, reconnaissance (2000)
- Northrop Grumman MQ-8C Fire Scout
- Northrop Grumman RQ-4 Global Hawk, reconnaissance (2001)
- Northrop Grumman RQ-180, intelligence, surveillance and reconnaissance (2013)
- Northrop Grumman Tactically Exploited Reconnaissance Node ISR UAV
- Northrop Grumman X-47A Pegasus, research (2003)
- Northrop Grumman X-47B flight proven prototype (2013)
- Northrop Grumman X-47C
- Northrop MQM-74A Chukar, target, decoy (1964)
- Northrop XBQM-108
- Northrop NV-144
- Northrop Grumman Bat
- Northrop Grumman Firebird
- NSRDC BQM-108
- Octatron SkySeer
- Oregon Iron Works Sea Scout
- Piccolissimo
- Piper LBP
- Pratt-Read LBE
- Prioria Robotics Maveric
- Project AQUILINE
- Propulsive Wing, high lift, large cargo-carrying, cross-flow fan propulsion (2008)
- Radioplane TDD-1, target (1939)
- Radioplane OQ-1
- Radioplane OQ-2
- Radioplane OQ-3
- Radioplane OQ-6
- Radioplane OQ-7
- Radioplane OQ-13
- Radioplane OQ-14
- Radioplane OQ-17
- Radioplane OQ-19
- Radioplane Q-1
- Radioplane Q-3
- Radioplane RP-1
- Radioplane RP-2
- Radioplane RP-3
- Radioplane RP-4
- Radioplane RP-5
- Radioplane RP-70
- Radioplane RP-71 Falconer
- Radioplane RP-76
- Radioplane RP-77
- Radioplane RP-78
- Radioplane RP-86
- Radioplane Dennymite
- Radioplane XKD4R
- Radioplane MQM-33
- Radioplane MQM-36 Shelduck
- Radioplane AQM-38
- Radioplane MQM-57 Falconer
- Radioplane KD2R Quail
- Radioplane BTT
- Republic SD-3 Snooper
- Republic SD-4 Swallow
- Resolute Eagle, reconnaissance (2016)
- RoboSeed Nano
- Rockwell HiMAT. research, (1979)
- RTX Coyote LE SR Air-Launched Effects (ALE)
- Ryan AQM-34 Firebee, target (1951)
- Ryan AQM-81A Firebolt, target (1983)
- Ryan AQM-91 Firefly, reconnaissance (1968)
- Ryan BQM-34 Firebee, target (1951)
- Ryan YQM-98
- Ryan Model 147 Lightning Bug, reconnaissance (1962)
- Ryan Q-2
- Ryan KDA
- Ryan YQM-98A Compass Cope R, reconnaissance (1974)
- S-TEC Sentry, reconnaissance (1986)
- Shield AI Nova, LiDAR Simultaneous Localization and Mapping (SLAM) + Visual SLAM + Inertial Measurement Unit (IMU) fusion
- Shield AI V-BAT, Hivemind AI, VTOL, SOCOM
- Sikorsky Cypher, research, (1992)
- Simmonds Aerocessories OQ-11
- Sea Robin XFC
- Sky Sentinel
- Skydio X10D has DedroneBeyond radar sensors (for C-UAS), (but no LiDAR), flashlight, Pan, Tilt, and Zoom (PTZ) motorized movement cameras, radiometric thermal camera, infrared (its AI-vision sensors), (but no back, side & above cameras), autonomous navigation with obstacle avoidance via spatial & Levatas (& EP) AI (& a speaker), Replicator funded In industry-speak, it's called Sense and Avoid (SAA) / Detect and Avoid (DAA) reactive jink maneuvering.
- Sonex Aircraft Teros
- Swift Engineering, Swift020/021
  (スウィフト020/021) (2016)
- Systems Integration Evaluation Remote Research Aircraft (SIERRA), research (2009)
- Taylorcraft LBT
- TechJect Dragonfly UAV
- Teledyne Ryan 410
- Teledyne Ryan BQM-145 Peregrine, reconnaissance (1992)
- Teledyne Ryan Scarab
- Temco XKDT Teal, target (1957)
- Unmanned Aeronautics GhostRay, reconnaissance (2016)
- Unmanned Aeronautics XRay, (2016)
- Dzyne ULTRA
- Vector P
- Vera Tech Phantom Sentinel
- Wingtra WingtraOne
- XGAM-71 Buck Duck
- XSM-74
- Xtreme Drones Velocicopter DELTA, QUAD, HEX, (SUAV) Mult-rotor (2012)
- Northrop JB-1 Jet bomb (surface to surface)
- Northrop JB-10 Buzz bomb (surface to surface)
- Aeronca GB-1, GB-2, GB-3, GB-4, GB-5, GB-6, GB-7, GB-8, GB-9, GB-10, GB-11, GB-12, GB-13, GB-14 and GB-15 (air to surface)
- Aeronca GT-1 (air to ship)
- WFEL JB-4 (surface to surface, air to surface)
- Zephyr Systems ARK-350
- Zephyr Systems OKO-250
- Zephyr Systems Malachi
- Zephyr Systems Titus
- Zipline (delivery drone)

List of United States drone bases

== Vietnam ==
- ITAD M-400
- AV.UAV.s1, s2, s3, s4, Ms1
- VT-Patrol

== See also ==
- Loitering munition
- Unmanned combat aerial vehicle
