= Drone warfare =

Attack by one or more unmanned combat aerial vehicles

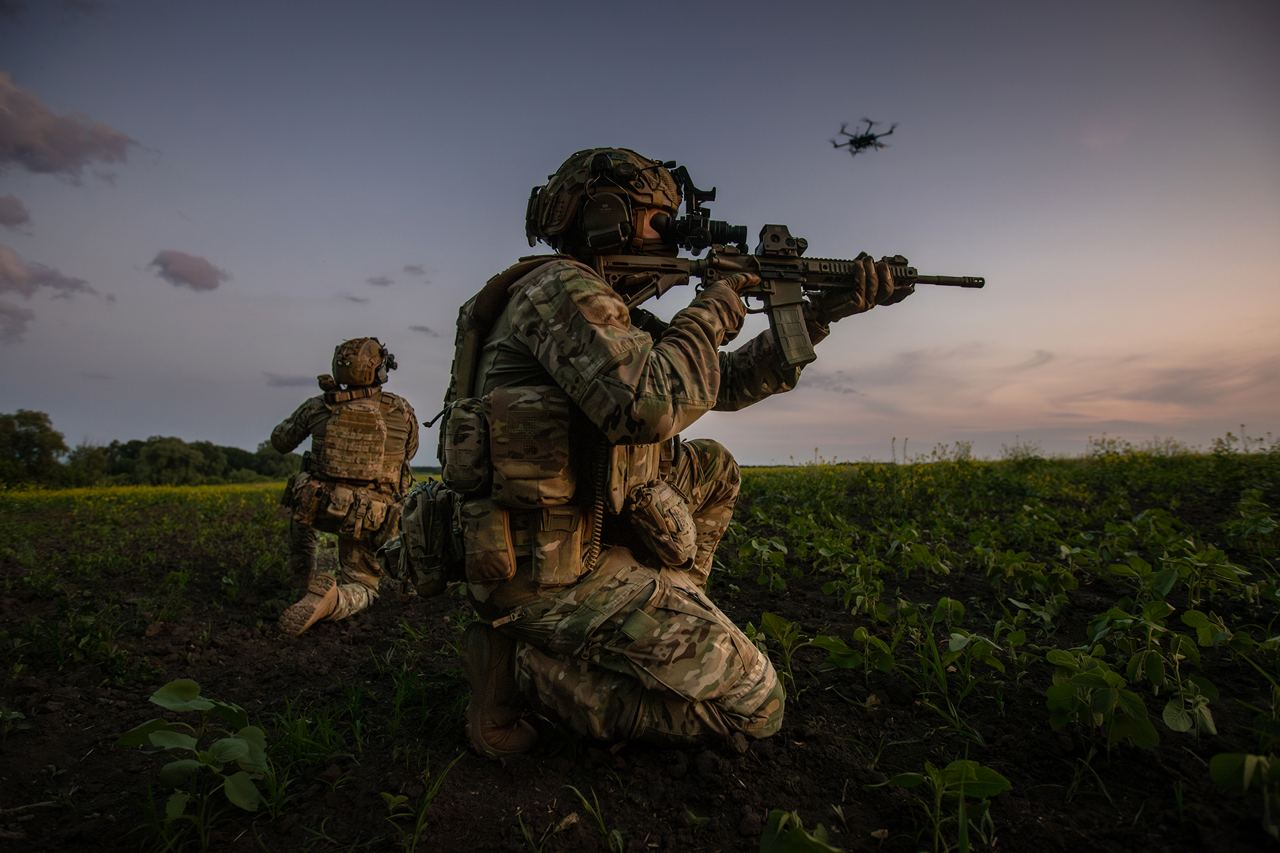
Ukrainian Alpha Group operators alongside a multirotor FPV drone during the Russo-Ukrainian war, 2023

Drone warfare is the use of military robots and unmanned systems in warfare. The unmanned systems may be remote controlled by a pilot or have varying levels of autonomy during their mission. Types of unmanned systems and platforms include unmanned combat aerial vehicles (UCAV) or weaponized commercial unmanned aerial vehicles (UAV), unmanned surface vehicles (USV) or unmanned underwater vehicles (UUV), and unmanned ground vehicles (UGV). SUAVs and MAVs are man-portable UAVs and can be deployed for low-altitude, short-range support operations. Autonomous drones such as autonomous aircraft and LAWS utilize artificial intelligence or pre-programmed algorithms. As of 2019, the following nations have been identified as having operational UCAVs: China, France, Greece, India, Iran, Iraq, Israel, Italy, Pakistan, Poland, Russia, South Korea, Turkey, the United States, the United Kingdom, and Ukraine.

Drones are an expendable force multiplier that may supplement–or reduce the necessity for–live personnel during operations. Military applications of drones range from reconnaissance tasks, kamikaze missions, logistical support, bomb disposal, training and medical evacuation to electronic warfare, anti-air, anti-armor, and anti-personnel roles. However drones are typically tasked with intelligence, surveillance, target acquisition, and reconnaissance (ISTAR) missions, facilitating direct attacks on targets as part of a kill chain or through manned-unmanned teaming. Aerial drone attacks can be conducted via purpose-built UCAVs that launch ordnance during a drone strike, by loitering munitions and one-way attack drones laden with a warhead that explodes on impact, or by civilian UAVs weaponized to deploy munitions or crash into a target. Larger drones can serve a "mothership" role by deploying sub-drones or by providing electronic warfare capabilities such as radio relay. Heavy-lift drones may be used to airlift supplies or evacuate wounded personnel across a battlefield. Multiple drones can operate and attack simultaneously in a drone swarm.

The early years of the 21st century saw most drone strikes being conducted by the US military using air-to-surface missiles against ground targets within countries such as Afghanistan, Libya, Pakistan, Somalia, Syria, and Yemen during the war on terror. Drone warfare evolved and proliferated quickly in the 2010s and 2020s, with countries such as Azerbaijan, China, Iran, Israel, Russia, Turkey and Ukraine utilizing drones with increased ubiquity. Militant groups, such as the Islamic State and the Houthis, and crime groups such as Mexican cartels and Haitian gangs likewise have used drones for attacks against adversaries and for logistical purposes.

The Russo-Ukrainian war is "widely recognised as the world's first drone war" due to the large scale and high intensity of drone attacks, and the role of this experience in evolving the tactics of modern conventional warfare. Both armies have used a multitude of UAVs, including long-range fixed-wing drones and short range multirotor FPV drones. Ukraine became the first country to create a military branch exclusively dedicated to drone warfare—the Unmanned Systems Forces—in June 2024, with Russia following soon with its own Unmanned Systems Forces in November 2025. The Russo-Ukrainian war demonstrated how drones have disrupted traditional military doctrines in a manner similar to how gunpowder revolutionized warfare, making them a "decisive" factor in future conflicts.

== Commercial UCAVs ==
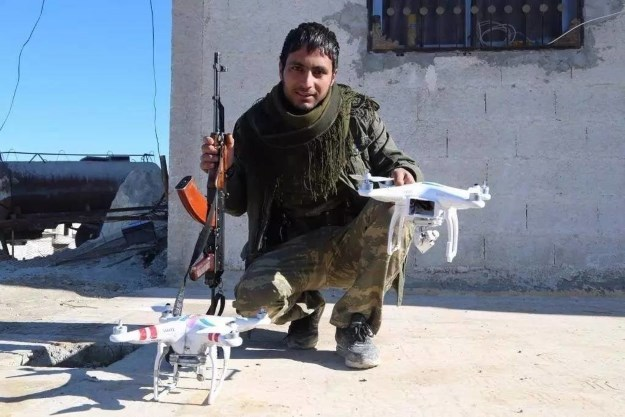
Weaponizing of DJI Phantom commercial videography UAVs by the Islamic State

A commercial UCAV is any commercially-produced UAV that is modified aftermarket to carry such weapons as guided bombs, cluster bombs, incendiary devices, air-to-surface missiles, air-to-air missiles, anti-tank guided missiles or other types of precision-guided munitions, autocannons and machine guns. These weaponized civilian drones may proceed to fire munition or a missile, drop explosives and crash into or detonate above vulnerable targets. Payloads could include explosives such as hand grenades, mortar shells and IEDs or other dangerous materials such as shrapnel, chemical, radiological or biological hazards. These relatively cheap drones are also used for non-attack roles. For example, multirotor FPV drones have been used extensively by both armies for aerial reconnaissance and artillery spotting in the Russo-Ukraine War.

Anti-UAV systems are being developed by states to counter the threat posed by commercial UCAVs. According to James Rogers, an academic who studies drone warfare, "There is a big debate out there at the moment about what the best way is to counter these small UAVs, whether they are used by hobbyists causing a bit of a nuisance or in a more sinister manner by a terrorist actor."

== Americas ==
=== United States ===
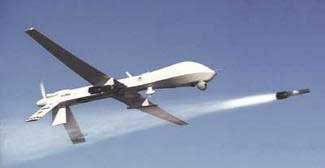
A Predator drone firing a Hellfire missile. The United States often utilizes UCAV strikes to attack specific targets.

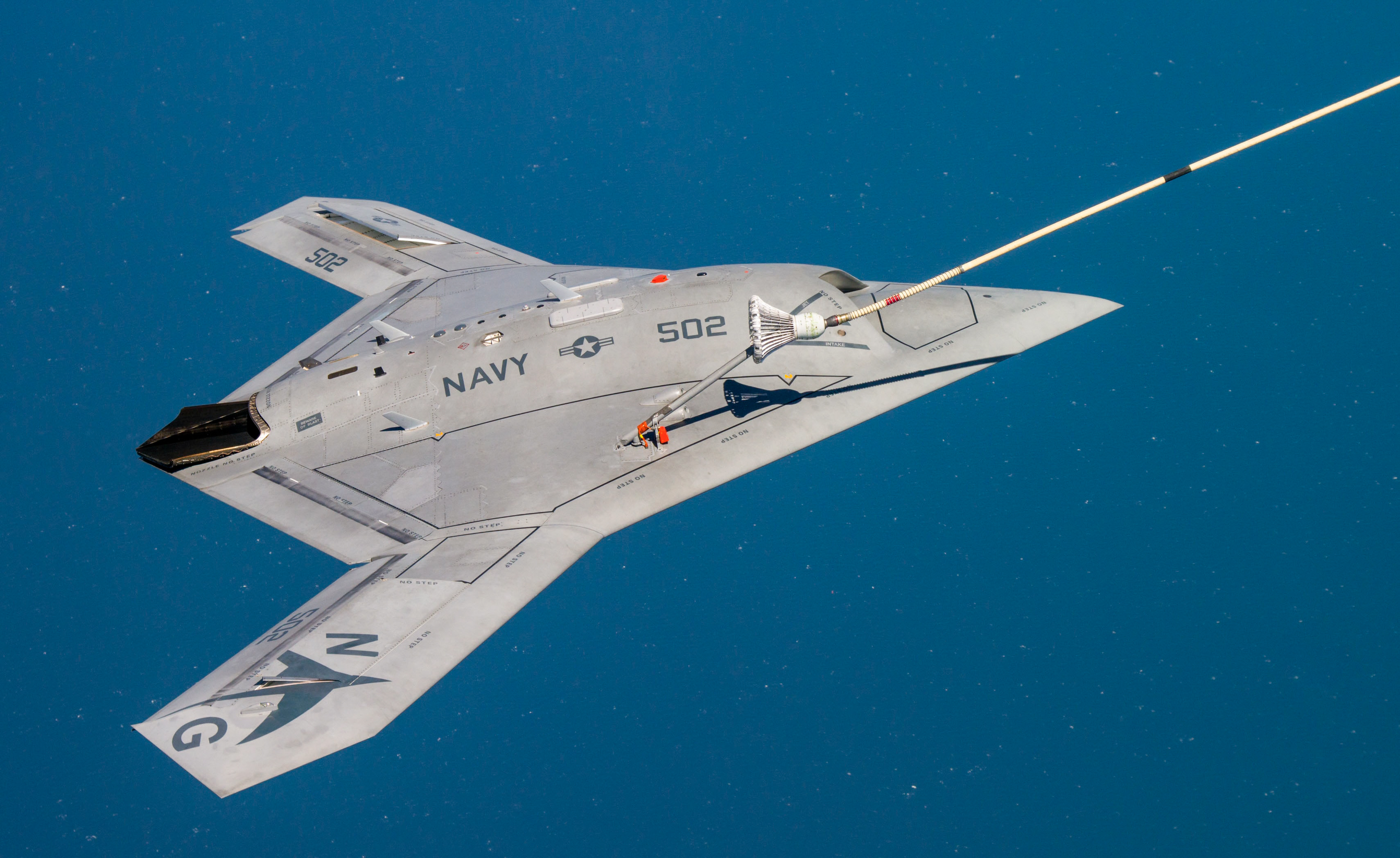
X-47B was the first unmanned aircraft to be catapulted from an aircraft carrier and the first to be aerially refueled fully autonomously.

During the 1991 Gulf War, the United States Army operated a UAV Platoon from Fort Huachuca to conduct flight surveillance and target acquisition missions, particularly utilizing the RQ-2 Pioneer. During Operation Desert Storm, the U.S. Air Force launched a wave of BQM-74C target drones to saturate the air space above Baghdad and overwhelm the city's integrated air defense system. The drones served as decoys to bait Iraqi air defenses into activating their tracking radars, allowing Wild Weasel units to attack the exposed radar installations.

Estimates for the total number of people killed in U.S. drone strikes in Pakistan range from 2,000 to 3,500 militants killed and 158 to 965 civilians killed. 81 insurgent leaders in Pakistan have been killed. Drone strikes in Yemen are estimated to have killed 846–1,758 militants and 116–225 civilians. 57 Al-Qaeda in the Arabian Peninsula leaders are confirmed to have been killed.

In August 2018, Al Jazeera reported that a Saudi Arabian-led coalition combating Houthi rebels in Yemen had secured secret deals with al-Qaeda in Yemen and recruited hundreds of that group's fighters: "... Key figures in the deal-making said the United States was aware of the arrangements and held off on drone attacks against the armed group, which was created by Osama bin Laden in 1988."

Under Biden, drone strikes reportedly decreased. A Biden administration drone strike in Kabul, Afghanistan in August 2021 killed 10 civilians, including seven children. Later, a drone strike killed Al-Qaeda leader Ayman al-Zawahiri.

In 2021, the U.S. Navy's Naval Forces Central Command established Task Force 59 to further integrate armed and unarmed drones and artificial intelligence into maritime operations, particularly in the Fifth Fleet's area of operations. Task Force 59 helped expand the navy's procurement and deployment of unmanned surface vessels, such as the Saildrone Explorer and the T38 Devil Ray.

By mid-2025, reports emerged that the U.S. military was lagging behind in evolving its drone warfare capabilities, particularly its production and deployment of inexpensive first-person view UAVs akin to those seen during the Russo-Ukrainian war. A July 2025 memo by defense secretary Pete Hegseth urged military leadership to accelerate the adoption of drones among troops. In September 2025 the U.S. envoy to Ukraine, Keith Kellogg, stated Ukraine had overtaken the U.S. in drone technology amid the Russo-Ukrainian war, as battlefield experience prompted continuous innovation in drones. Defense industry executive Steve Siomi, the president of robotics defense company Allen Control Systems, said China had overtaken the U.S. in responding to drone proliferation and argued that drone adoption made warfare more affordable for all combatants, including America's rivals.

In July 2025, the U.S. military revealed the LUCAS one-way attack drone which was promoted as a low-cost counter to enemy drone warfare, costing $35,000 per unit. LUCAS utilizes technology reverse engineered from Iran's HESA Shahed 136. During the 2026 Iran War, the U.S. Navy deployed the Global Autonomous Reconnaissance Craft (GARC) drone speedboat and the autonomous Corsair USV, which successfully rescued two pilots after Iranian forces shot down their Apache helicopter. Three Corsair USVs were also used to strike an Iranian sea port in Bandar Abbas, becoming the first-ever combat use of kamikaze sea drones by the U.S. military.

==== Effects ====
Scholarly opinions are mixed regarding the efficacy of drone strikes, particularly targeted killings conducted by UCAVs such as MQ-1 Predator and MQ-9 Reaper drones. Some studies support that decapitation strikes to kill a terrorist or insurgent group's leadership limits the capabilities of these groups in the future, while other studies contradict this. Drone strikes are successful at suppressing militant behavior, though this response is in anticipation of a drone strike rather than as a result of one. Data from the U.S. and Pakistan's joint counter-terrorism efforts show that militants will cease communication and attack planning to avoid detection and targeting.

Proponents of UCAV drone strikes assert that such strikes are largely effective in targeting specific combatants. Some scholars argue that drone strikes reduce the amount of civilian casualties and territorial damage when compared to other types of military force like large bombs. Military alternatives to drone strikes, such as raids and interrogations, can be extremely risky, time-consuming, and potentially ineffective. However relying on drone strikes does not come without risks, as U.S. drone usage sets an international precedent on extraterritorial and extrajudicial killings.

U.S. UCAVs regularly deploy the AGM-114 Hellfire missile, which has the R-9X variant that utilizes a kinetic warhead with pop-out blades instead of an explosive warhead, greatly reducing collateral damage while targeting specific people.

=== Brazil ===
During Operation Containment in Brazil, the drug cartel Comando Vermelho used drones and bombs against the police.

=== Haiti ===
In Haiti, the Viv Ansanm gang coalition has access to a variety of illegal weapons and are capable of deploying drones.

=== Mexico ===
In Mexico, drug cartel drone operators are called "droneros" who are known to use bomb-dropping drones on enemy targets. The United States has itself used drones to help conduct drug busts against cartel leadership inside Mexico.

== Africa ==
Nine African countries manufacture drones domestically.

Rank	Country	Units manufactured domestically
1	South Africa	94
2	Nigeria	36
3	Algeria	29
4	Ethiopia	21

=== Libya ===
In 2020, a Turkish-made UAV loaded with explosives detected and attacked Haftar's forces in Libya with artificial intelligence and without command, according to a report from the UN Security Council's Panel of Experts on Libya published in March 2021. It was considered the first attack carried out by an AI UAV.

=== Sudan ===
The Sudanese civil war that began in 2023 saw increasingly regular usage of drone warfare as the conflict continued, with drone strikes resulting in mass civilian casualties. Drones allowed both the Sudanese Armed Forces (SAF) and Rapid Support Forces (RSF) to expand their strike range and bring the war "to places that were once safe", including markets, residential areas and military sites located far beyond the front line. According to the Centre for Information Resilience, Sudanese drone warfare evolved from FPV quad-copter drones to larger UCAVs with extended range and the ability to deploy precision-guided munitions. On 19 September 2025, amid the siege of El Fasher, an RSF drone struck a mosque at an IDP camp, killing 75 people. Sudan's paramilitary also conducted drone strikes on the city of Port Sudan.

Drone strikes in Sudan rose sharply in 2026, becoming the leading cause of civilian casualties during the civil war. A "double-tap" drone strike on a market in Abyei reportedly killed 220+ people on 19 October 2026; the strike was allegedly perpetrated by the Sudanese Armed Forces targeting RSF fuel supply trucks. Eight days later a drone struck a market in Nyala, killing 103 people, according to Emergency Lawyers, a human rights group monitoring violence in Sudan. The United Nations stated that drone strikes accounted for at least 880 civilian deaths between January and April 2026 and had killed 306 people and injured hundreds more in the first three weeks of October 2026 alone.

== Asia ==
=== Azerbaijan ===
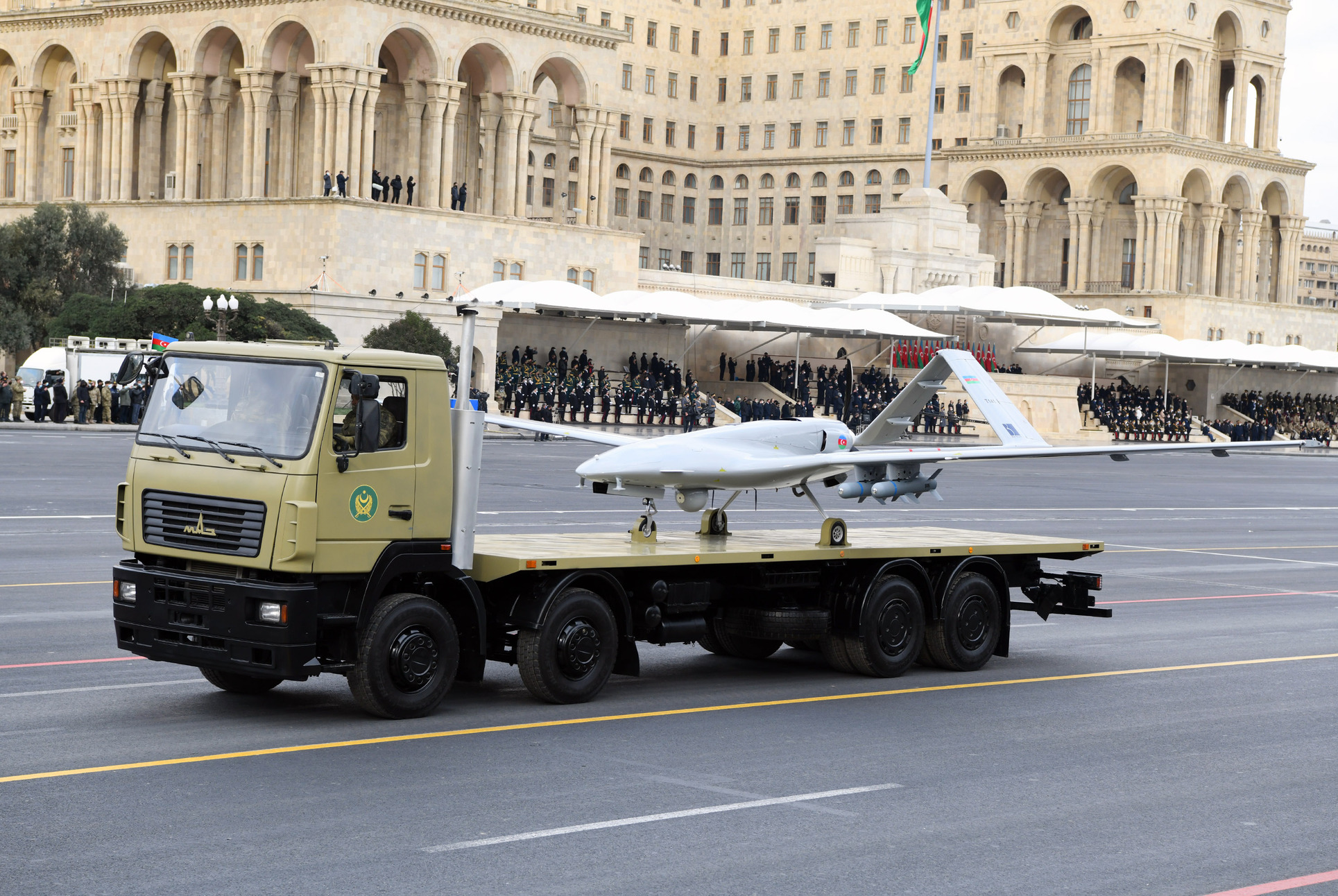
Bayraktar TB2 at the 2020 Victory Parade in Baku, Azerbaijan

UCAVs were used extensively by the Azerbaijani Army against the Armenian Army during the 2020 Nagorno-Karabakh conflict. These UCAVs included Israeli IAI Harops and Turkish Bayraktar TB2s. As the Bayraktar TB2 utilizes Canadian optics and laser targeting systems, Canada suspended export of its military drone technology to Turkey in October 2020 after allegations that the technology had been used to collect intelligence and direct artillery and missile fire at military positions. After the incident, Aselsan stated that it would begin the serial production and integration of the CATS system to replace the Canadian MX15B.

The Economist has cited Azerbaijan's highly effective use of drones against Armenia in the 2020 Nagorno-Karabakh war and Turkey's use of drones in the Syrian Civil War as indicating the future of warfare. Noting that it had previously been assumed that drones would not play a major role in conflicts between nations due to their vulnerability to anti-aircraft fire, it suggested that while this might be true for major powers with air defenses, it was less true for minor powers. It noted Azerbaijani tactics and Turkey's use of drones as indicating a "new, more affordable type of air power". It also noted that the ability of drones to record their kills enabled a highly effective Azerbaijani propaganda campaign.

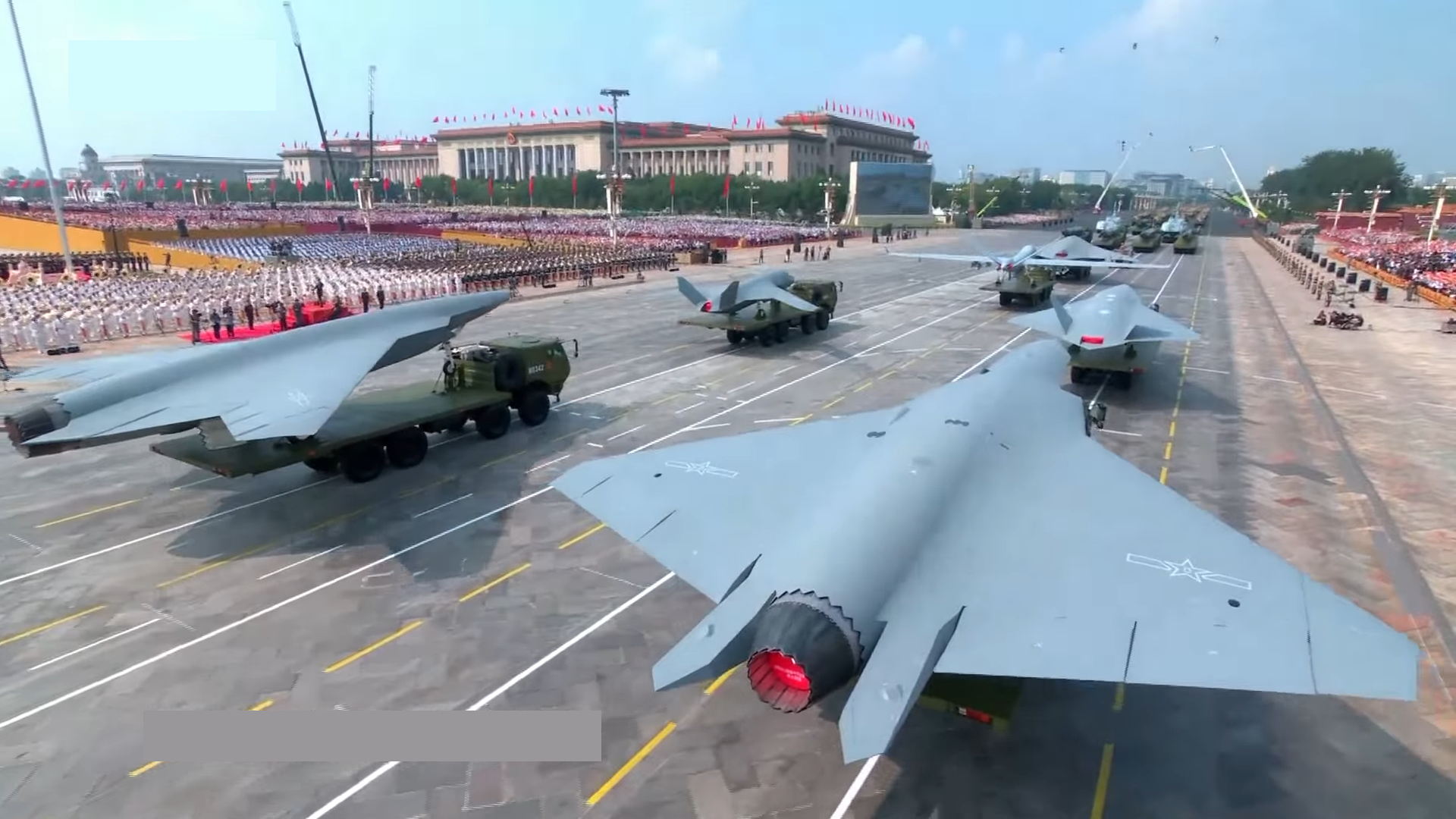
UCAVs and loyal wingman drones during the 2025 China Victory Day Parade

=== Iran ===
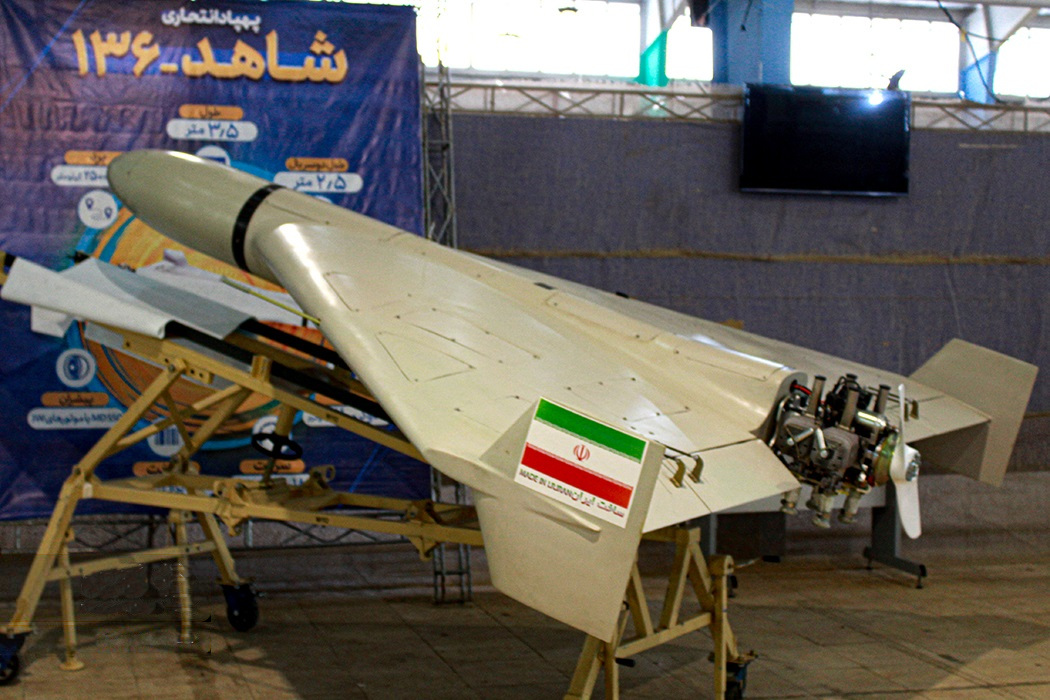
Iran's Shahed 136 is credited with expanding the global market for low-cost, high-performance one-way attack drones.

In December 2011, Iranian forces captured a U.S. RQ-170 Sentinel reconnaissance drone. The Iranians reverse engineered it to emulate its technology and produce domestic analogs such as the Shahed 171 Simorgh and Shahed Saeqeh. Iran's Qods Yasir is also based on a captured U.S. MQ-27 ScanEagle UAV.

Iran has militarily supported Russia during the Russo-Ukrainian war, largely via its regular delivery of Shahed drones such as the Shahed 131 (Geran-1) and Shahed 136 (Geran-2) and associated training of thousands of Russian troops on drone warfare. Around 2024, Iran and Russia had struck a billion-dollar weapons deal allowing for Russia to domestically produce 6,000 customized variants of the Shahed 136.

In 2025, as part of the Twelve-Day War, Iran launched several drone attacks on Israel in response to Israel's bombing of Iranian nuclear facilities. During the 2026 Iran war, Iran launched numerous kamikaze drones against neighboring countries in the region hosting U.S. forces. Six U.S. troops were killed and 30+ were injured when a small, slow, low-altitude Iranian one-way attack drone evaded counter-battery radar and struck a tactical operations center in Port Shuaiba, Kuwait. The IRIS Shahid Bagheri, an Iranian drone carrier converted from a container ship, was heavily damaged by U.S. forces during the war.

=== Israel ===
Israel has utilized drones in warfare since 1973, starting with usage in the Yom Kippur War to conduct surveillance missions and counter Egyptian and Syrian surface-to-air missile systems. Israel uses drones extensively in warfare for surveillance and targeted attacks on enemies. In June 2025 it was reported the Mossad covertly established drone bases inside Iran as part of the preparations for war between the sides.

Israel had become a leading developer and manufacturer of military drones by the 2020s, with drones composing of 9% of Israel's weapons exports by 2021.

=== Myanmar ===
Drones revolutionized the Myanmar civil war, with both the military junta and resistance forces (PDFs/EAOs) using them for surveillance and, primarily, to drop bombs, acting as a crucial, low-cost air force for rebels.

The Tatmadaw uses more sophisticated drones, including Chinese-made CH-3 and CH-4, along with Shahed-136 "suicide" drones. They use these for surveillance and to guide artillery strikes, increasingly employing "kamikaze" or "suicide" drones that detonate on impact with targets. The military has countered the rebels by strengthening its electronic warfare capabilities, using for example, drone guns, and heavy jamming to disrupt rebel drone operations.

Resistance groups commonly modify commercial agricultural drones for payloads, Initially, rebel forces used small, off-the-shelf quadcopters, but have shifted to larger, custom-made, or modified fixed-wing drones to drop bombs and deliver ordnance, with thousands of attacks documented. Groups like the Karenni Nationalities Defense Force (KNDF) maintain dedicated units to build, repair, and 3D-print drones, often using techniques found on YouTube. Drones have been crucial for resistance fighters for taking over military bases, disrupting troop movements, and operating as a "homemade air force".

October 2021 and June 2023, over 1,400 drone attacks were verified, with, in some cases, thousands of bombs dropped on military bases in a single month. Due to Chinese restrictions on exports of dual-use items, resistance groups have found it more challenging to acquire drones, shifting towards acquiring parts rather than pre-assembled units. The warfare is increasingly shifting toward faster, more durable FPV (First Person View) drones for precise, faster attacks.

=== Non-state actors ===
==== Hamas drone attacks ====
On 7 October 2023, Hamas launched incursions of southern Israel, using commercial drones to bomb Israeli guard towers before breaching the border wall. Videos of Israeli troops and a Merkava IV tank being taken out by drones surfaced on the internet. In 2025, there was an increase in drone usage by Hamas in the Gaza Strip.

==== Houthi drone attacks ====
On 25 March 2022, the Houthis launched coordinated drone and missile strikes on multiple Saudi energy facilities, including sites in Jeddah and Ras Tanura. The attacks temporarily disrupted oil production and caused fires at Aramco facilities.

Between late 2023 and July 2024, during the Gaza War, the Houthis carried out over 100 attacks on commercial ships in the Red Sea and Bab al-Mandab Strait. These attacks used drones, missiles, and fast boats, targeting vessels linked to Israel, the U.S., and its allies.

==== Islamic State drone attacks ====
Small drones and quadcopters have been used for strikes by the Islamic State in Iraq and Syria. A group of twelve or more have been piloted by specially trained pilots to drop munitions onto enemy forces. They have been able to evade ground defense forces.

During the battle for Mosul, the Islamic State was able to kill or wound dozens of Iraqi soldiers by dropping light explosives or 40-millimeter grenades from numerous drones attacking at the same time. Drone strikes were also used to destroy military supplies. Drone footage released by the Islamic State showed bombs being dropped on an ammunition facility located in Deir ez-Zor, Syria, an area of contested control between the Islamic State and the Syrian government at the time.

In 2017, FBI Director Christopher Wray stated at a Senate hearing that "We do know that terrorist organizations have an interest in using drones ... We have seen that overseas already with some frequency. I think that the expectation is that it is coming here imminently."

Drone expert Brett Velicovich discussed the dangers of the Islamic State utilizing off-the-shelf drones to attack civilian targets, claiming in an interview with Fox News that it was only a matter of time before ISIS extremists use of drones to strike civilian targets would become more prevalent and sophisticated.

The overall success rate for drone strikes used by the Islamic State is unclear. The Islamic State may have used drones as a way to gather footage for propaganda purposes rather than for their military value.

=== Syria ===
On 6 January 2018, Russian forces thwarted a drone (UAV) swarm attack on the Khmeimim Air Base, the first of this kind in the history of warfare. The HTS, an Islamist group, utilized drone warfare to help take over Damascus on 8 December 2024.

=== Thailand ===
On 24 July 2025, the Royal Thai Armed Forces launched coordinated drone strikes against the Royal Cambodian Armed Forces in the disputed border area near Ta Muen Thom and Ta Krabey. Using FPV drones, quadcopters, and one-way kamikaze UAVs, Thai forces targeted Cambodian command posts, ammunition depots, artillery positions, and communication lines. Analysts described the campaign as one of the most prominent uses of commercial multirotor drones in a state-on-state conflict since the war in Ukraine, challenging assumptions that such drones are ineffective in dense jungle terrain.

== Europe ==
=== Russo–Ukrainian war (2022–present) ===
In the Russo-Ukrainian war, use of Russian drones (unmanned aerial vehicles) increased about tenfold from early 2024 through summer 2025.

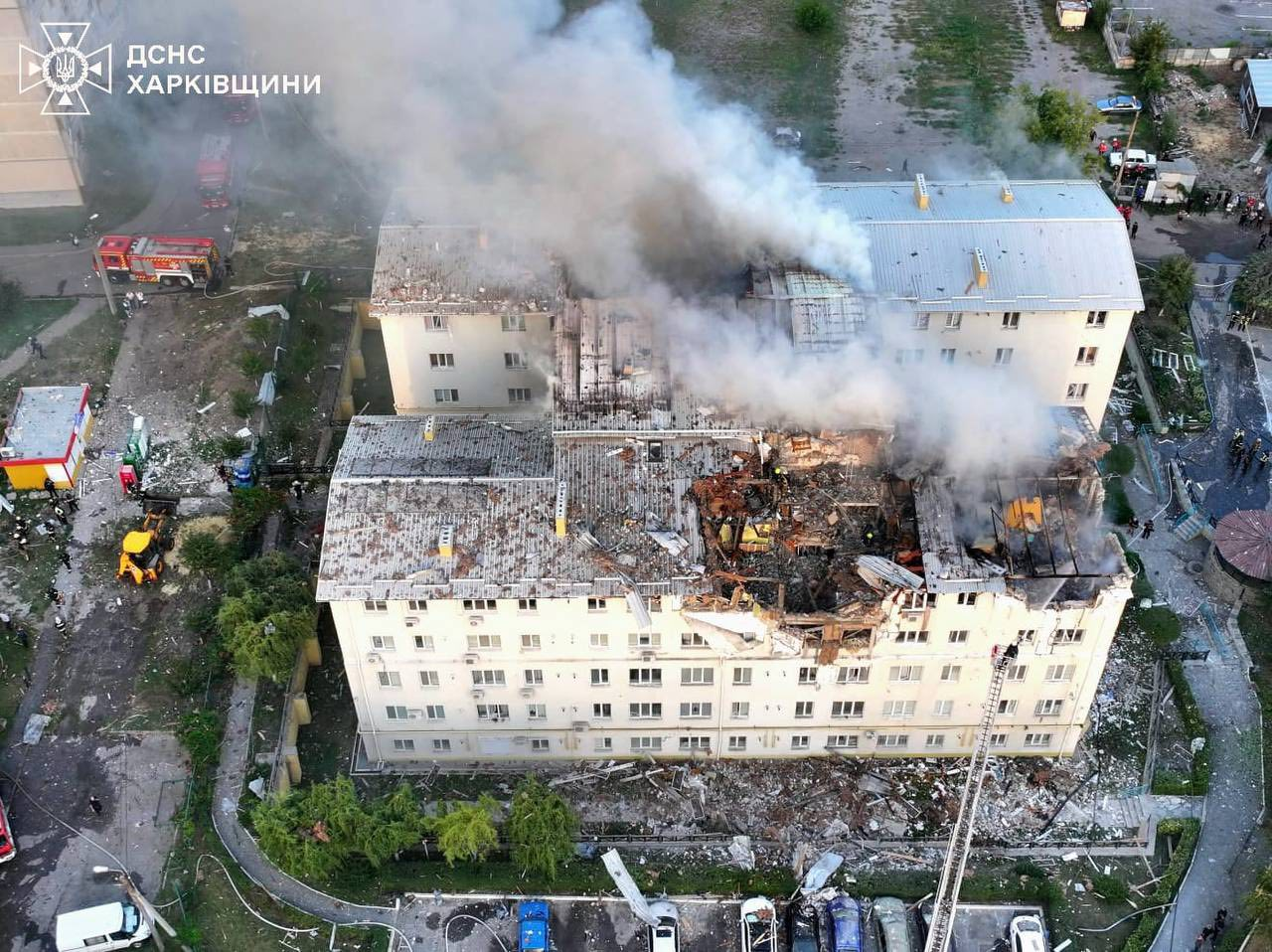
Aftermath of a Russian drone strike on an apartment block in Kharkiv, 2025

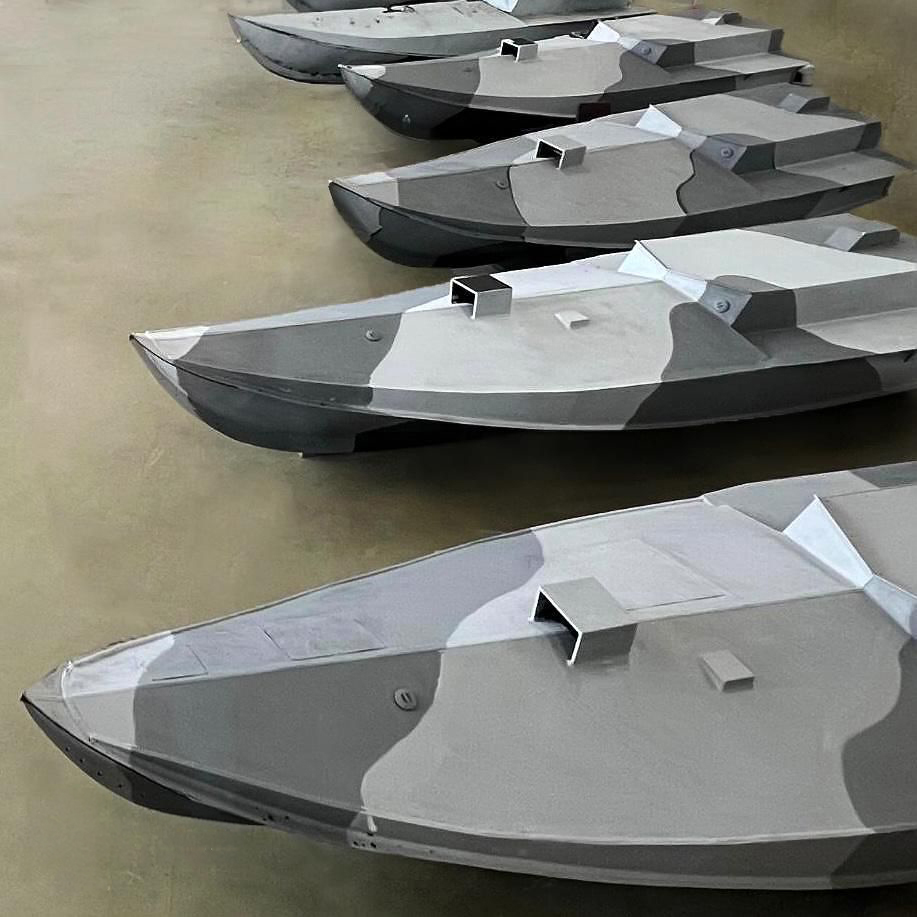
Ukrainian "Sea Baby" naval drones in 2023

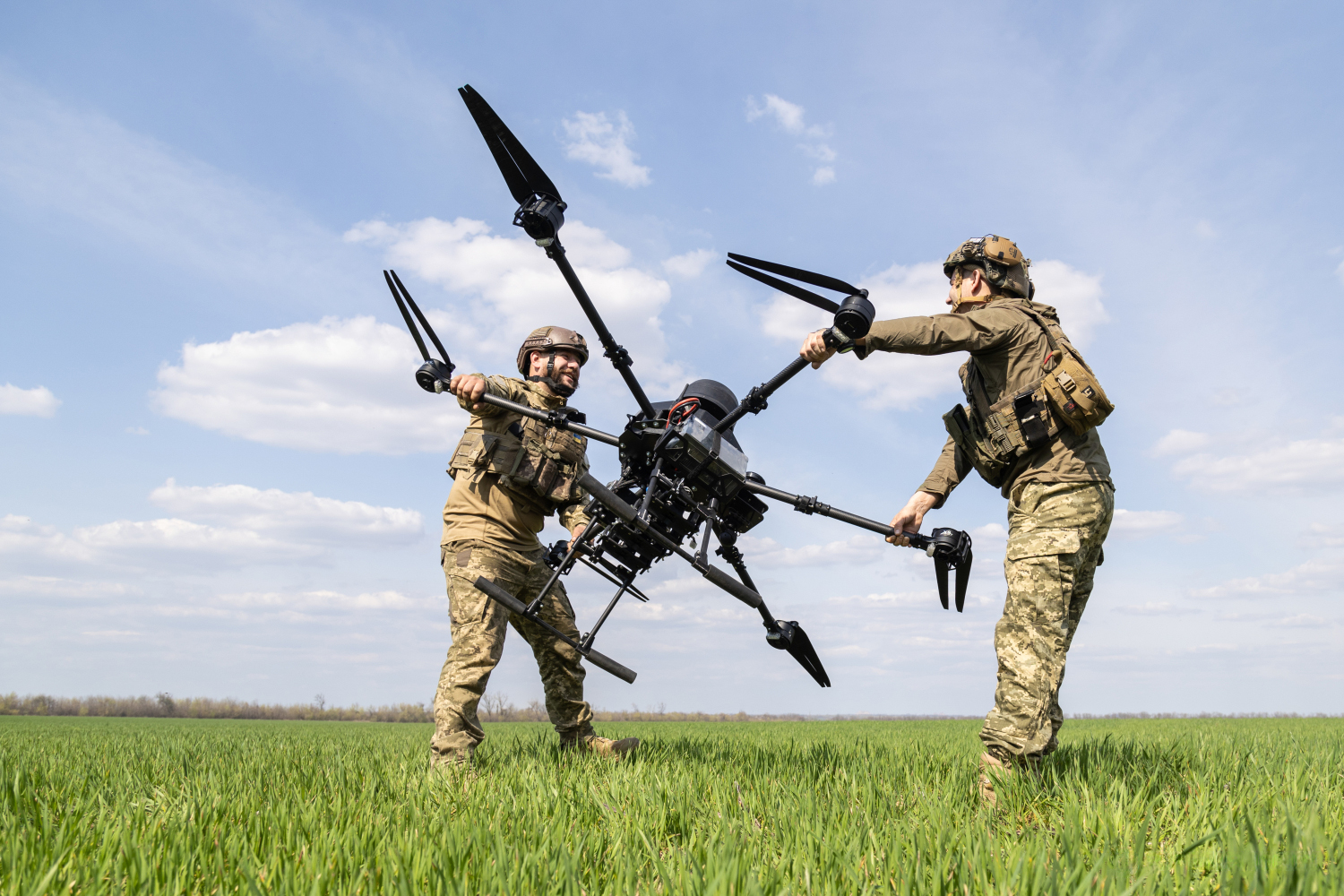
Calibrating a "Baba Yaga" heavy lift drone in 2024

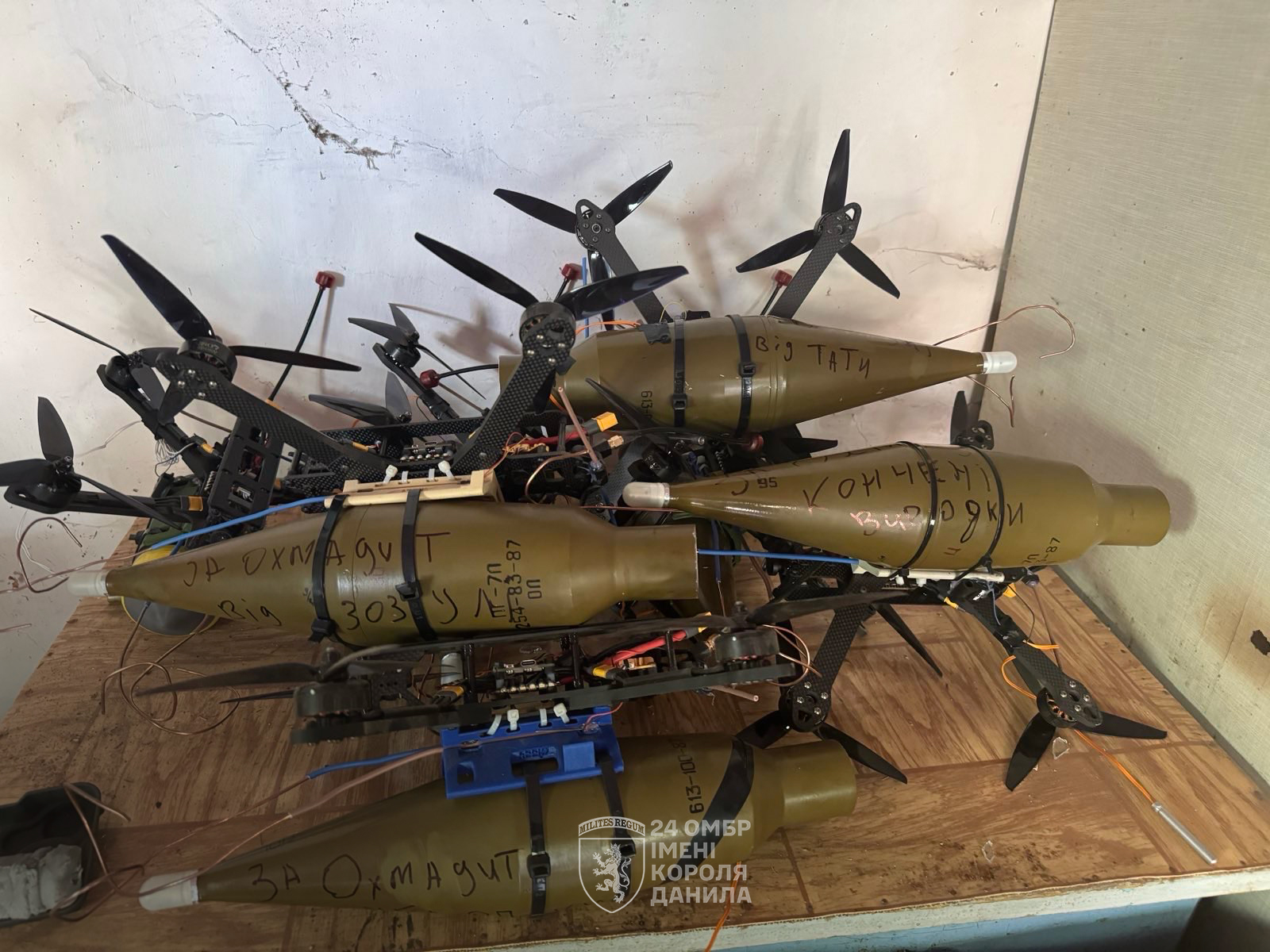
Ukrainian FPV kamikaze drones utilized during the battle of Chasiv Yar

D1L-Duck drone

The Russo-Ukrainian war that began in 2022 is recognized as "the world's first drone war" due to both Russian and Ukrainian armies heavily integrating drones into daily combat and reconnaissance tasks, including for long-range bombing attacks and supporting ground assaults and offensives. In the early months of the war, Ukrainian forces extensively used the Turkish-made Bayraktar TB2 UCAV to conduct strikes against Russian forces. Russian forces meanwhile launched waves of Iranian HESA Shahed 136 drones during the October 2022 missile strikes on Ukraine. Ukraine and Russia have since developed their own one-way attack drones for both tactical and strategic-level attacks. The main roles of drones in the war, however, are in reconnaissance and artillery spotting. The ubiquity of drones spurred the development of anti-drone tactics; for example Russian sources claimed to have used a "Stupor anti-drone rifle" to jam the radio controls of Ukrainian drones. In 2024, Ukraine became the first country in the world to create a military branch dedicated to drone warfare, known as the Unmanned Systems Forces, Russia followed suit in 2025 with the creation of the Unmanned Systems Forces of Russia.

Small commercial drones in Ukraine were first used during the Donbas War, where Ukrainian volunteer units employed commercially available unmanned aerial vehicles for reconnaissance and surveillance. By 2016, volunteers were acquiring and modifying consumer drones for military use, using them to photograph enemy positions and provide real-time aerial imagery to Ukrainian forces. One notable example was Aerorozvidka, a volunteer organization founded in 2014 that helped equip and support Ukrainian volunteer battalions with small commercial UAVs for aerial reconnaissance and surveillance, which were later adopted by the Ukrainian Armed Forces. This experience later contributed to the expansion of Aerorozvidka's drone operations, where it developed more advanced unmanned systems, such as the R18, an armed octocopter developed by the organization from 2017 and tested in combat in 2019. Pro-Russian Separatist forces likewise began employing commercially available UAVs for battlefield reconnaissance, with some drones subsequently being adapted to carry and drop improvised munitions. The experience gained during the conflict demonstrated the military potential of inexpensive commercial UAVs and contributed to their wider adoption during the Russian Invasion of Ukraine in 2022.

On 13 October 2022, the first recorded instance of an unarmed drone-on-drone combat encounter occurred above the Donetsk region of Ukraine. A Ukrainian DJI Mavic quadcopter was recorded ramming a Russian drone of the same model, resulting in the latter crashing towards the surface below. Another instance of this aerial ramming tactic occurred on 24 November 2022, this time with the Russian DJI Mavic being recorded plummeting towards the ground after a collision with a Ukrainian drone. On 9 May 2023, a Russian conscript surrendered to (or rather via) a Ukrainian drone. The average HESA Shahed 136 drone is worth about $20,000. An IRIS-T missile is worth about $430,000 each in comparison. From 13 September until 17 October, open source information suggests that Ukraine has had to spend $28.14 million on defending against these drones.

Since at least September 2022, Ukraine has used black naval drones, equipped with the Starlink satellite internet system, to carry attacks on the Russian Black Sea fleet at the Sevastopol Naval base. The naval drones were at first assumed to be for reconnaissance, but appear to carry munitions and act as a bomb. With experts noting that the sensors on the front of the naval drone could be used as a laser range finder to help in targeting. In late October 2022, seven of these drones were used to mount a successful drone attack on the Sevastopol Naval base.

On 13 October 2022, a Ukrainian MiG-29 became the first manned plane to go down during combat due to a drone. The pilot is claimed to have destroyed a Shahed-136 drone with his cannon. The blast is believed to have brought the plane down and hospitalised the pilot.

In September 2023, Ukrainian troops were reportedly using cardboard drones with GoPro cameras for aerial reconnaissance.

Since the start of the war, approximately 30 companies in Ukraine have emerged to mass-produce drones for the war effort. The Ukraine government Ministry of Digital Transformation initiated the "Army of Drones" project and attempted to purchase up to 200,000 drones in 2023, aiming to deploy relatively cheap drones against large advantages Russia has had in military equipment. In 2023, they also sponsored several competitions where the "dozens of drone developers that have sprung up all over Ukraine" are invited to make simulated attacks on ground targets, or chase fixed-wing drones, or even participate in drone dogfight competitions. One new model that has been successful is the "Baba Yaga" hexacopter, which can carry "44 pounds (19.96 kg) of payload".

From early 2024, Ukraine has started deploying manned aircraft, such as the Aeroprakt A-22 Foxbat and Yakovlev Yak-52, which uses snipers or machine guns to shoot down Russian drones. Ukrainian drones have also been given a variety of improvised modifications for the express purpose of attacking and countering Russian drones; these include an instance in July 2024 where an FPV drone with a stick mounted to it was used to attack and eventually destroy a ZALA 421-16E reconnaissance drone through repeated aerial ramming. In 2024 drones controlled through a tether with optical fiber became commonplace, thus avoiding radio jamming.

On 31 July 2024, a Russian Mi-8 helicopter was downed over occupied Donetsk, by a Ukrainian FPV drone, the first time a helicopter in combat was destroyed by a drone. The Mi-8 was believed to have been attacked near the ground either during landing or take off.

In February 2025, Russian authorities reportedly discovered a plot in which a shipment of FPV drone headsets loaded with explosives were sent to Russian soldiers. Each headset had 10-15 grams of explosives and were programmed to detonate on activation. Officials compared it to the 2024 Lebanon electronic device attacks by Israel. Subsequent reports claimed 8 Russian FPV pilots lost their eyesight due to explosions between 4 and 7 February.

On 1 June 2025, Ukraine carried out Operation Spiderweb. Dozens of FPV drones were smuggled into Russia in trucks, and were then launched from the trucks to strike Russian airbases, including Belaya and Olenya, destroying multiple Russian strategic bombers.

Fire at the Moscow Oil Refinery on June 18, 2026

Ukrainian drone attacks on Russian oil refineries have caused a fuel crisis in Russia.

Nevertheless, an article by a Ukrainian journalist published by the Atlantic Council in December 2025 states: "The Kremlin strategy has focused on mass producing a limited range of models for use on the battlefield and in the bombardment of Ukrainian cities. This methodical approach has paid dividends. By the end of 2024, it was already becoming clear that the drone war was turning in Russia's favor. This trend has only intensified over the past year".

The largest drone strike of the war was on 7 September 2025, when Russia launched 810 drones and 13 missiles at Ukraine, of which 747 drones and four missiles were intercepted, while 54 drones struck targets.

On 9 September 2025, over a dozen Russian drones breached Polish airspace, prompting a NATO Quick Reaction Alert and Poland invoking Article 4 of the NATO treaty. At least four of the drones were confirmed shot down. On 18 September Polish and Ukrainian officials announced that the two countries would establish joint military training and production programs, as the Ukrainian military had emerged as a major pioneer in drone warfare in the Russo-Ukrainian war.

By 2026, some Ukrainian media analysis framed long-range drone and missile-drone strikes as part of a broader shift from tactical drone use near the front line toward attacks on Russian logistical infrastructure, including fuel supplies, transport nodes, ports, warehouses, repair facilities and air defence systems. Ukraine's Unmanned Systems Forces began the middle strike campaign in early April 2026 to degrade Russian logistics in Russian-occupied territories of Ukraine heavily utilizing one-way attack drones. Around this time, Russia reportedly began mass deployment of AI-enabled autonomous versions of its "Molniya" one-way attack drone, exhibiting a reduced radar cross section, smaller IR signature and a negligible electronic emissions due to not needing to communicate with a UAV operator.

== Anti-drone warfare ==
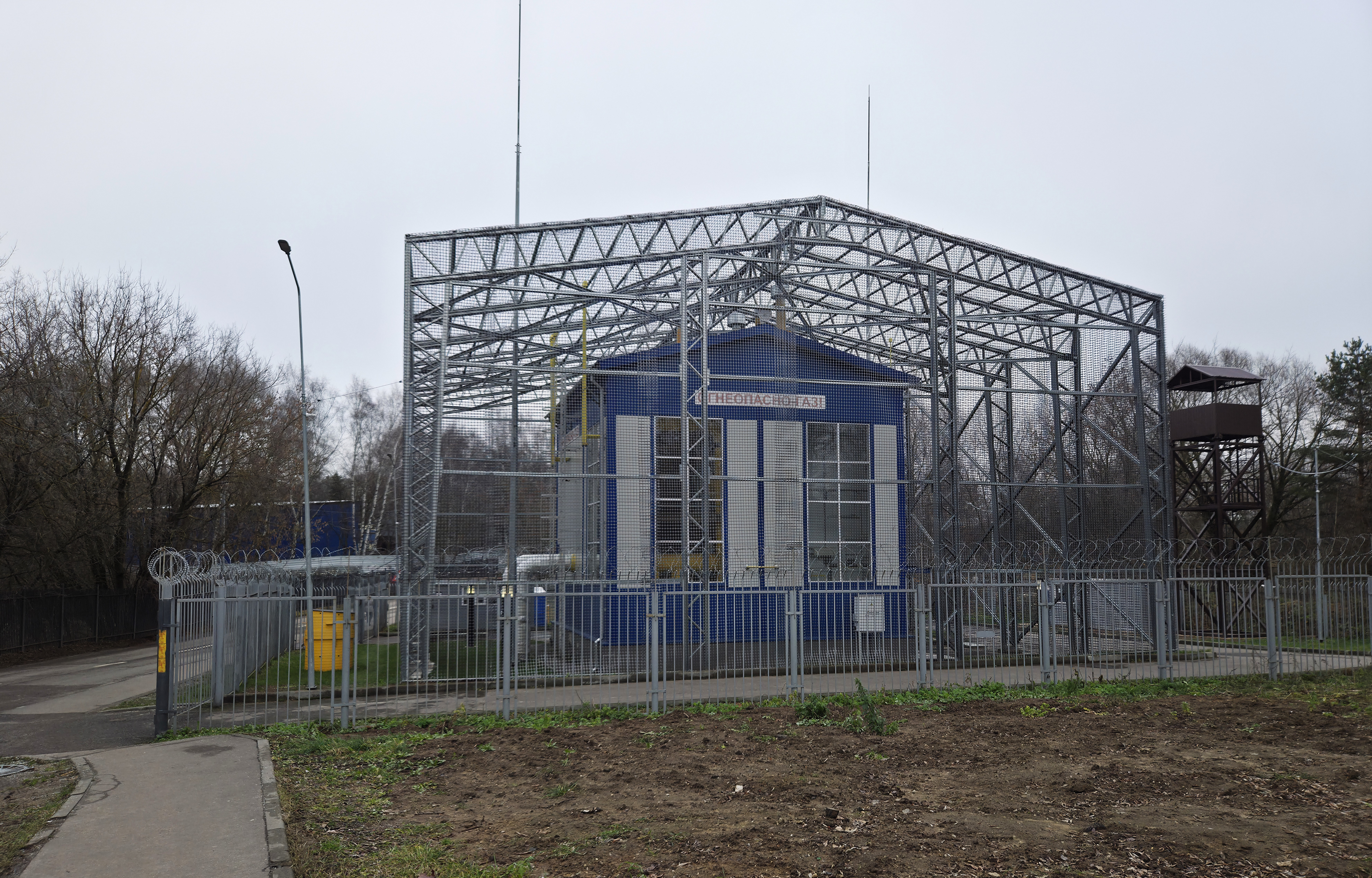
Metal anti-drone mesh protecting gas infrastructure in Moscow, November 2025

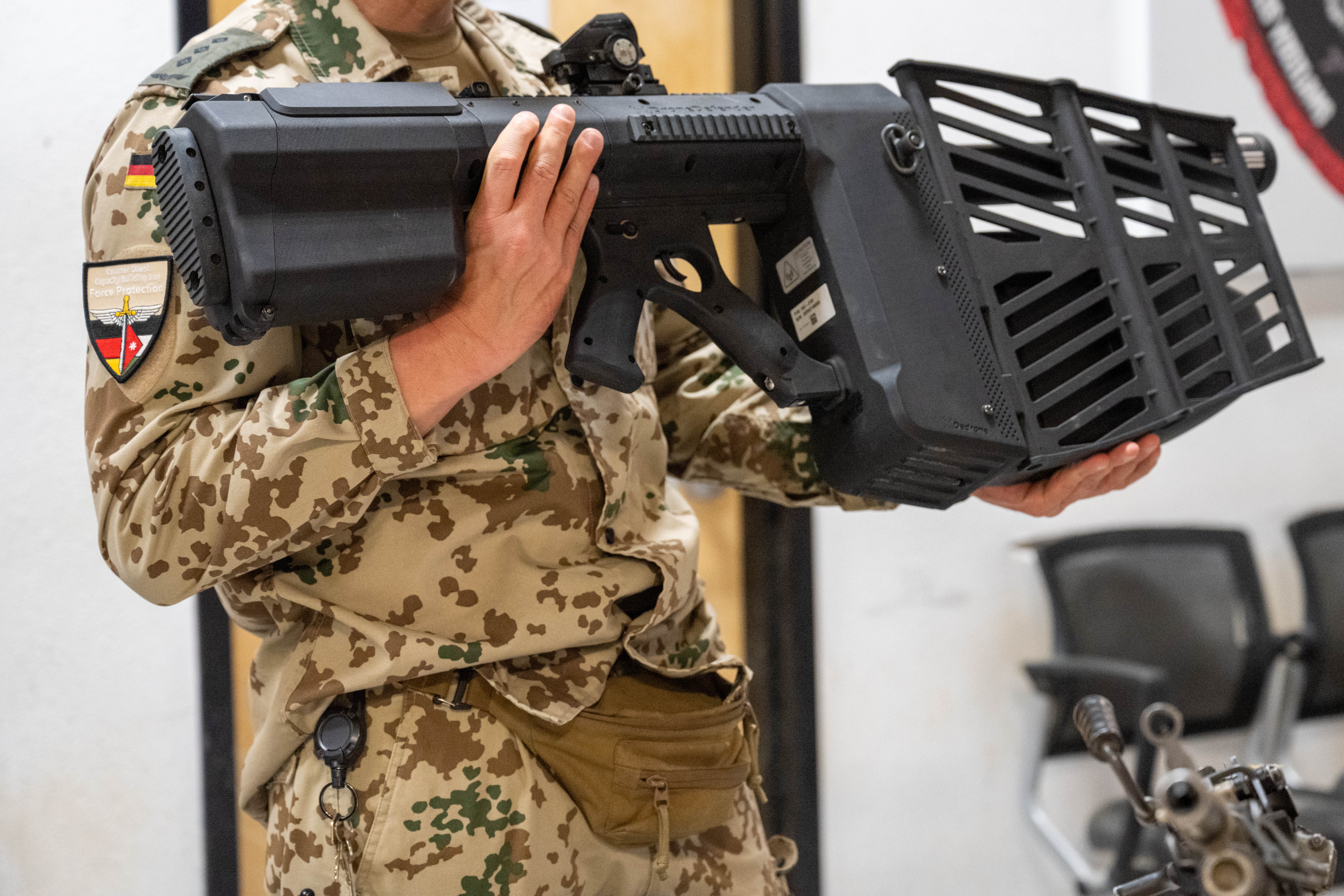
German soldier displays a Dronebuster counter-UAV weapon, December 2025

As drone warfare evolved, anti-drone warfare also matured. Drones can be intercepted kinetically (projectiles, missiles, barriers or another drone) or non-kinetically (directed-energy weapons, hacking, or communications jamming). Buildings, vehicles, roads, weapons platforms, trenches and fortifications can be modified with materials such as wire mesh, netting, metal caging or chain-link fencing to defend against kamikaze drone attacks. Decoys may be used to mislead and divert incoming drone attacks or deceive enemy drone surveillance.

Aerial drones can be shot down from the ground using anti-drone guns, anti-aircraft guns, missile interceptors, laser beams and occasionally small arms fire (depending on the drone's altitude). UAVs can be intercepted air-to-air by interceptor drones, helicopters, fighter aircraft or by otherwise physically obstructing the drone's flight path. Electronic countermeasures include signal jamming, spoofing and hi-jacking, often by means of in-flight hacking. Larger UAVs that share similar flight profiles to manned aircraft, such as the MQ-1 Predator, remain prone to being shot down via more traditional methods such as MANPADs or SAMs. During the Russo-Ukrainian war, soldiers began shooting down approaching UAVs using shotguns, machine guns and rifle fire. Trainer aircraft such as the Yak-52 were repurposed to intercept enemy UAVs.

Surface drones such as UGVs and USVs can also be neutralized kinetically or non-kinetically. A UGV may be vulnerable to terrain obstacles as simple as a ditch or booby trap and can be attacked by shorter-range weapons such as land mines, anti-armor weaponry and small arms fire. USVs can be neutralized by various anti-surface warfare methods including naval mines, weapons mounted on defending ships and aircraft, and obstacles on the water's surface. Underwater drones may be countered by underwater warfare methods ranging from underwater nets to more sophisticated seabed and anti-submarine warfare tactics.

Anti-drone mesh, netting or wooden logs can be used to protect vehicles, buildings, roads, seaports and weapons and radar systems against kamikaze drone attacks or to obfuscate targeting. Reactive, spaced, slat or improvised armor can also be applied to vehicles to defend against kamikaze drone threats.

=== Anti-drone weapons ===
Category:Anti-drone weapons

- Laser weapon: Anti-drone systems
- Drone killer cartridge for infantry rifles and machine guns
- Bukovel-AD, Ukrainian anti-drone electronic warfare system
- EDM4S (Electronic Drone Mitigation 4 - System), Lithuanian portable electronic warfare anti-drone device
- Merops, American short-range counter-UAV system
- MORFIUS, Lockheed Martin's drone-killer platform utilizing high-power microwave technology to counter drone swarms in airspace
- Octopus-100, Ukrainian UAV interceptor utilizing thermal imaging and computer vision for autonomous targeting
- R-330Zh Zhitel, Russian truck-mounted jamming communication station
- Yolka, Russian hand-held fire-and-forget UAV interceptor

== See also ==
=== Large systems and manufacturers ===
- Drone Dome, Israeli anti-aircraft, including anti-drone system developed by Rafael ADS
- DronesVision, Taiwanese arms manufacturer, specialising in UAV and anti-UAV technologies
- ZALA Aero Group, Russian arms manufacturer, specialising in UAV and anti-UAV EW systems

=== Other related topics ===
- Unmanned Systems Forces of Ukraine
- PlayStation mentality
- Public opinion about the United States drone attacks
- Lethal autonomous weapon
- Military robot
- The Nightmare of the Vultures, documentary TV series
- Unmanned surface vehicle
- Zanana
- Civilian casualties from the United States drone strikes
- Group of Governmental Experts on Lethal Autonomous Weapons Systems
- Campaign to Stop Killer Robots
