= Yolka =

Yolka is the transliteration of the Russian word "ёлка" meaning spruce or fir. It may refer to:

- In contexts related to Russian traditions the word "yolka" refers to the New Year tree or a Christmas tree
- Yolka (gaffe), a gaffe by former Ukrainian president Victor Yanukovych
- Yolka (singer), Ukrainian pop singer
- Yolka (drone interceptor), Russian handheld drone interceptor drone
