= PlayStation mentality =

Psychological phenomenon

PlayStation mentality refers to the dissociation between combatants and the consequences of their actions, as a result of the use of weapon interfaces which resemble video games.

The effect is named after the PlayStation games console, and is commonly cited in discussions of the problems of drone warfare, such as that conducted by the United States Central Intelligence Agency in the Pakistan tribal areas, typically using predator drones. Playstation mentality may contribute to the higher rate of mental health issues in drone operators compared to operators of manned aircraft.

== See also ==
- Depersonalization
