= ZALA 421-16 =

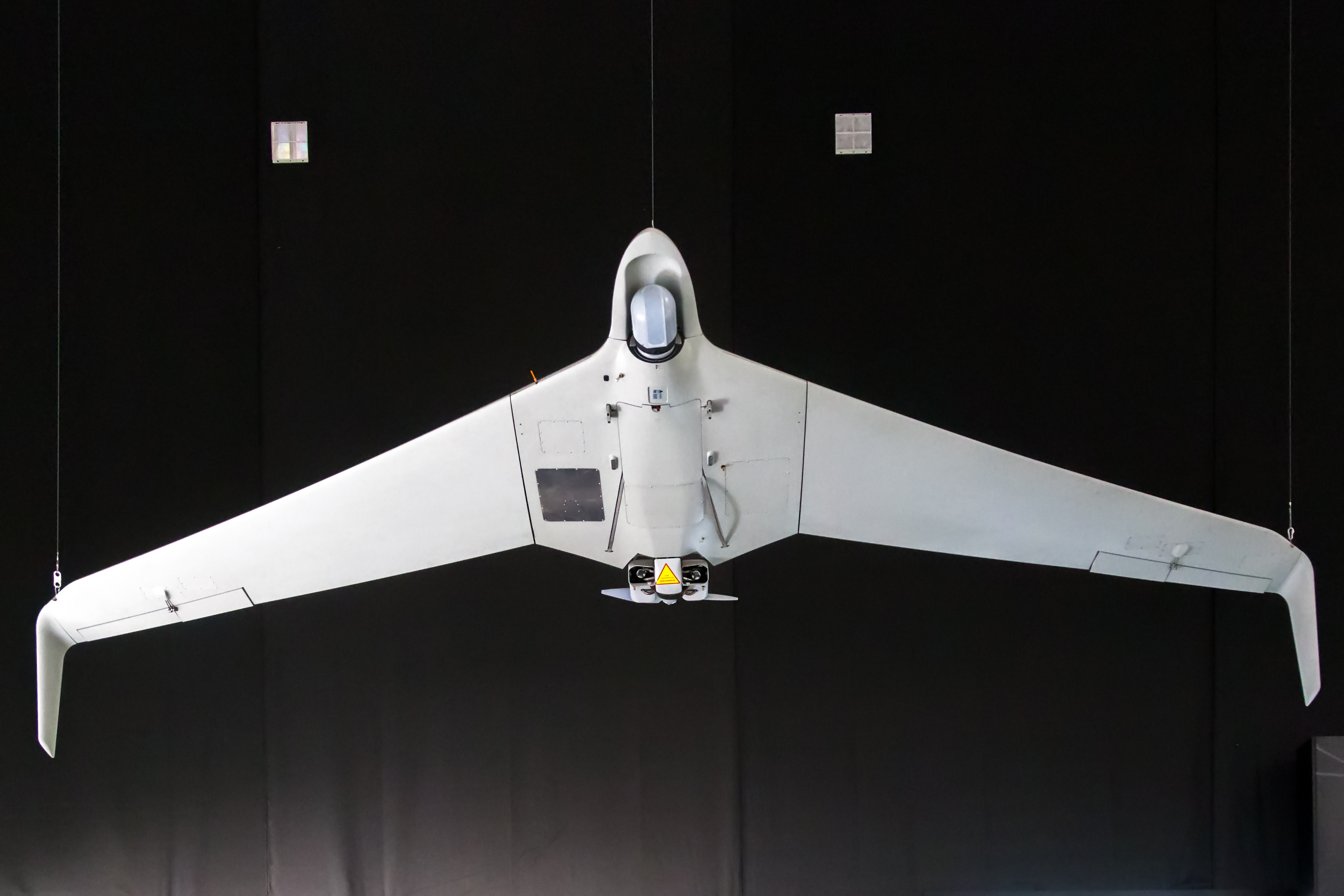

General information
- National origin: Russia
- Manufacturer: ZALA Aero Group
- Primary user: Russian Ground Forces

History
- Introduction date: 2010

ZALA 421-16 is a family of reconnaissance unmanned aerial vehicles developed by the Russian defence technology company Zala Aero Group.

== Operators ==
=== Military operators ===
Mongolia

- General Authority for Border Protection - 421-16E in service.

Russia

- Russian Armed Forces
  - Russian Ground Forces
- Ministry of Emergency Situations - ZARYA in service.

=== Civil operators ===
Russia

- Arctic and Antarctic Research Institute - T-16 in service.
- Russian Space Research Institute - T-16 in service.

== See also ==
- List of unmanned aerial vehicles
