= ZALA 421-08 =

Micro air vehicle

421-08
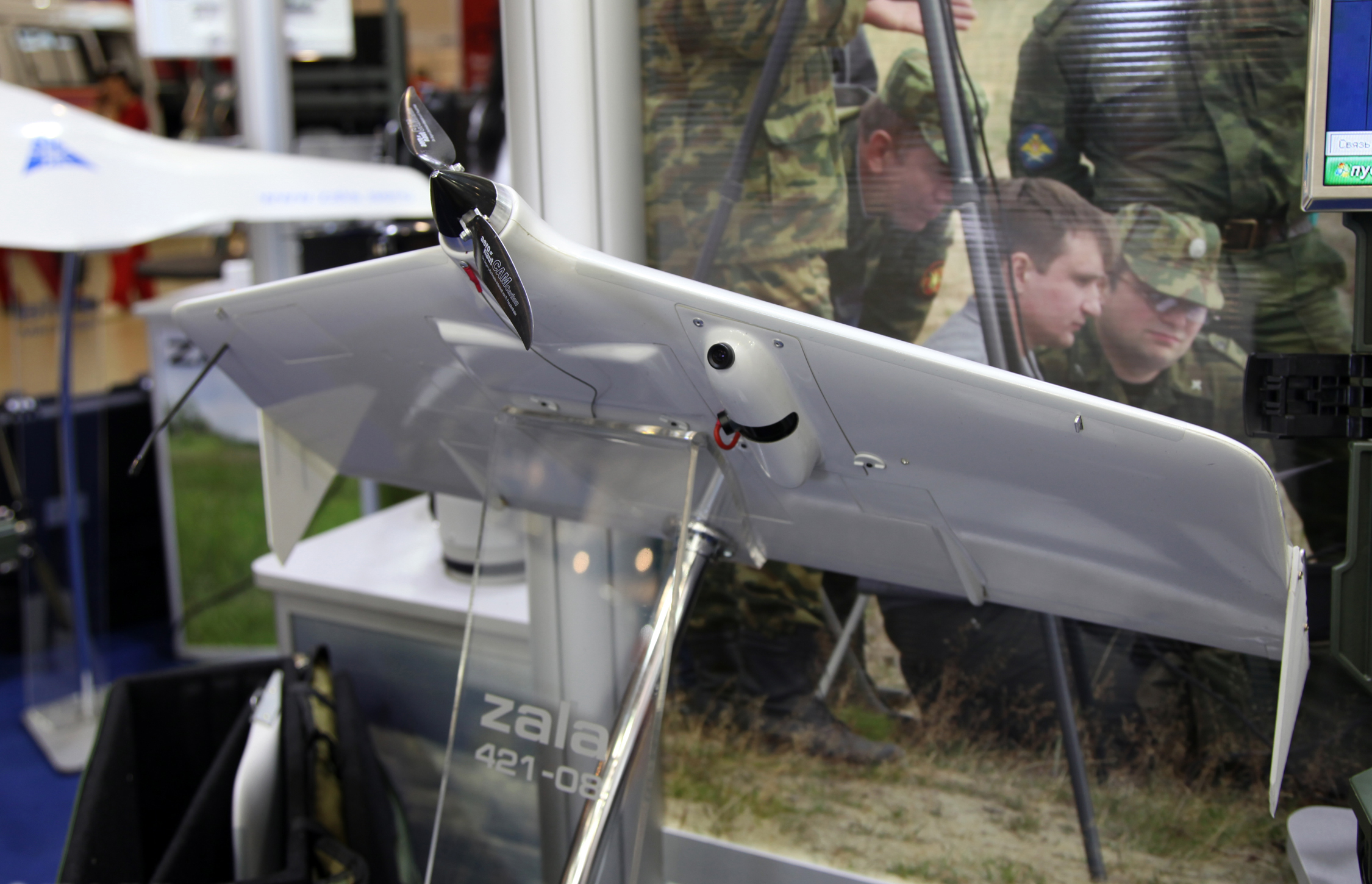

General information
- Type: Micro air vehicle
- Manufacturer: ZALA

ZALA 421-08 is a micro air vehicle developed and produced by the Izhevsk, Russia, based ZALA Aero company. It is a small, portable UAV platform. Weighing 9 kg, it includes 2 aerial vehicles, compact ground control station, 2 spare power supply kits and a backpack container used for transportation. ZALA 421-08 is designed for front-line reconnaissance, overground and oversea surveillance. It takes 3 minutes to prepare ZALA for launching. The UAV is operated in autonomous or semi-autonomous mode.

== Variants ==
421-08M

Improved variant with a longer range radio link

== Specifications ==
Physical:

- Wingspan: 0.8 m
- Length: 0.41 m
- Weight: 1.7 kg
- Flight altitude: 3600 m max above sea level
- Radio link: 15 km
- Maximum flight duration: 90 min – with electric engine
- Speed range: 65–150 km/h
- Launch: autonomously from hands
- Landing: parachute
- Navigation: Glonass/GPS
- Overall size (2 UAVs and GCS): 8 kg

Payload:

- Color Video camera (550 TVL)
- Infrared camera
- Photo camera (10 megapixels)
