= The Nightmare of the Vultures =

The Nightmare of the Vultures (Persian: کابوس کرکس‌ها) is a documentary of drones and a simulated drone attack that was shown Iranian state TV on 7 February 2014. The film gives a short history of the Iranian drone program, and depicts a simulated military counterattack against Israeli targets and American installations in the Persian Gulf. Iranian drones and missiles are shown bombarding Tel Aviv’s Kikar Hamedina square, Azrieli Towers skyscrapers, IDF’s The Kirya central command complex, Ben Gurion International Airport, Haifa's Technion, nuclear reactor in Dimona, and several air force bases. In the film, Ali Khamenei, Supreme leader of Iran, states that Iranian drones and missiles are used just for defense against our enemies.

== Content ==
Iranian advancement in the field of drone production is discussed. In particular, (Mohajer, Mohajer 4, Ababil 1, Ababil 2, Karrar) are shown to be developed by Iranian scientist.

Set to background music, the video begins with Ayatollah Ali Khamenei giving a speech to military graduates. Iran's drones are shown to evade Israel's Iron Dome systems of Tel Aviv and Haifa and Iranian missiles fall on the square Kikar Hamedina square, the Azrieli Towers, the Kirya (Israeli military control complex) and Ben Gurion International Airport, the Technion in Haifa, Ariha missile launch base, Zalim military base, Palmachim air base, War ministry building, Dimona nuclear reactor. The film then depicts Iranian drones launching missiles and destroying the USS Abraham Lincoln in the Persian Gulf as well as American military jets and helicopters taking off from the vessel.

== See also ==
- Airborne early warning and control
- Ghods Ababil
- Ghods Mohajer
- Karrar (UCAV)
- Unmanned aerial vehicle
