= ZALA 421-12 =

Micro air vehicle

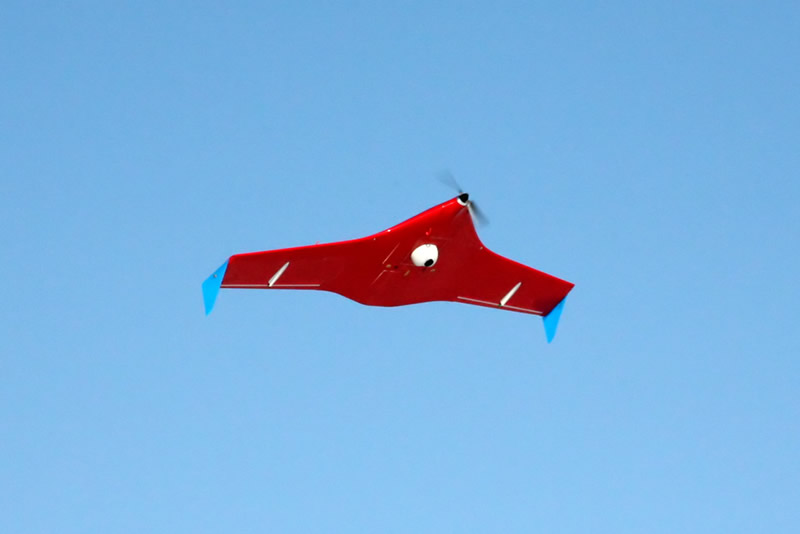
Unmanned plane ZALA 421-12

ZALA 421-12 is a micro miniature UAV developed and produced by the Izhevsk-based company ZALA Aero. It is a small, portable and reliable UAV platform. ZALA 421-12 is designed for front-line reconnaissance, overground and overseas surveillance. It takes 3 minutes to prepare the UAV for launching. The UAV is operated in the autonomous or semi-autonomous mode.

== Specifications ==
Physical:

- Takeoff weight, kg - 3.9;
- Navigation - GNSS;
- Flight duration, h - 2;
- Engine - electric;
- Minimum speed, km/h - 65;
- Maximum speed, km/h - 120 (limited by program);
- Maximum flight altitude, m above the sea level - 3600;
- Wingspan, m - 1.6;
- Length, m - 0.62;
- Wind speed during takeoff, no more than m/s - 10;
- Payload weight, kg max - 1;
- Launch - by means of catapult;
- Landing - parachute.

Payload:

- Color Video camera (550 TVL)
- Infrared camera (320*240 px)
- Photo camera (10 megapixels)
- Hazard Gas Analysis Module (Optional)
