= ZALA 421-06 =

Micro air vehicle

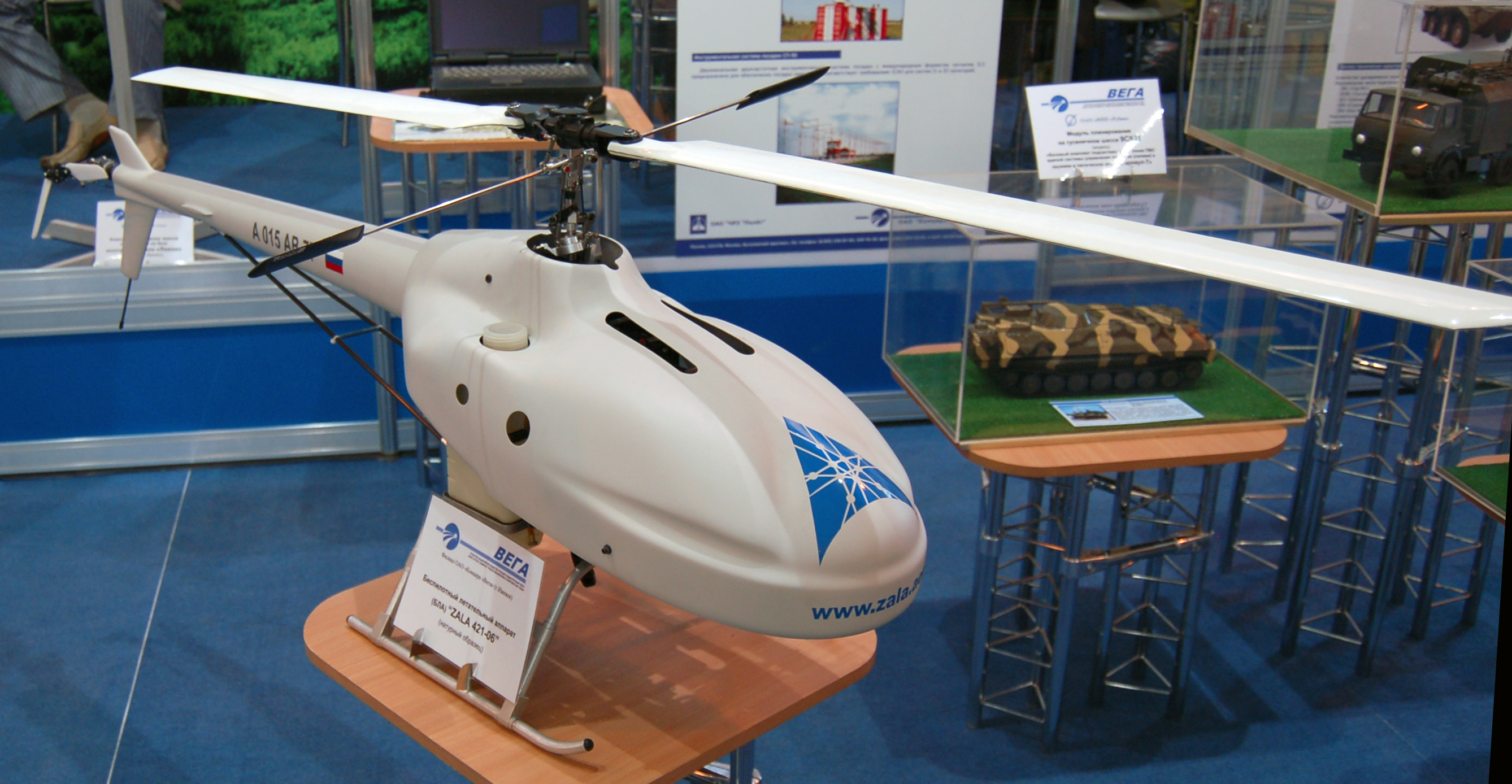
Zala 421-06

The ZALA 421-06 is an unmanned aerial vehicle helicopter designed and produced by Izhevsk-based ZALA Aero. This helicopter was developed in 2007–2008. In June, 2008 ZALA 421-06 was transferred to Russian Ministry of the Interior. This UAV can fly by program (in fully autonomous mode) and in manual mode.

== Specifications ==
Physical:

- Range: 40 km max
- Flight duration: 0.5 h
- Power unit: internal combustion engine
- Cruising speed – 54 km/h
- Maximum speed – 89 km/h
- Maximum flight altitude - 4000 m above sea level
- Size: 0,4 m ×1,57 m ×0,67 m
- Main rotor diameter - 1,77 m
- Payload weight - 3.5 kg max
- Takeoff/landing: vertical

Payload:

- Color Video camera 550 TVL
- Infrared camera 320*240 pixels
- Photo camera 10 megapixels
