= Public opinion about the United States drone attacks =

The use of drones by the United States military has attracted differing public opinion both within and outside the United States.

== Overview ==
Drones are used by the military in situations where manned flight is considered too risky or difficult. The United States Air Force has drones that range from small intelligence drones to surveillance drones and large spy planes. These drones are unmanned, instead operated remotely by a pilot. Trained crew steer the craft through cameras relaying visual information.

The year before the terrorist attacks of September 11, 2001, drone funding stood at around $284 million. By the fiscal year 2016, the Pentagon spent close to $3 billion on drones. For the fiscal year of 2027, the Pentagon is seeking $53.6 billion in funding to expand and advance its drone deployments, a total greater than the military budget of most nations.

The first known strike by an armed, networked combat drone by the United States military was in 2002, when President George W. Bush authorized a General Atomics MQ-1 Predator to kill Ali al-Harthi in Yemen. Under his administration, the military began using these crafts to strike suspected militants in Pakistan's tribal areas. The use of drones has almost doubled since the Obama administration took office.

Since their start, 3,900 people have been killed in 422 strikes in Pakistan, where the drones are controlled by the Central Intelligence Agency. The controversy of drones stems from the American people's concern of using advanced technologies to kill an enemy in foreign countries.

== Effect of dehumanizing language ==
A 2025 survey by the Bulletin of the Atomic Scientists found that dehumanization of drone strike reports impacted an individual's opinion on drone strikes. Their study evaluated both mechanistic and animalistic dehumanization. Mechanistic dehumanization reduces humans to objects or datapoints on a screen, while animalistic dehumanization produces rhetoric which likens humans to animals. The study determined that the pairing of animalistic dehumanization with a strike by semi-autonomous drone is most widely supported by Americans. The lowest level of support occurred from a combination of mechanistic dehumanization and a fully autonomous drone, dropping when respondents viewed an infrared image of a target and were told that artificial intelligence had operated the drone.

== Opinion in the United States ==
The US public has broad, nonpartisan support for drone strikes, likely due to the perception that they limit risk to US troops. Monmouth University Poll on July 25–30, 2013 asked 1,012 adults nationwide the question "How much have you read or heard about the use of unmanned surveillance aircraft, sometimes called drones, by the U.S. military overseas: a great deal, some, just a little, or nothing at all?" 29% replied a great deal, 31% some, 25% just a little and 15% said nothing at all (margin of error of 3.1) The same group of people were asked the question "How confident are you that FEDERAL law enforcement agencies will use drones appropriately: very, somewhat, not too, or not at all confident?" 11% said very confident, 36% somewhat confident, 18% not too confident, 31% not confident at all and 4% unsure (margin of error of 3.1).

In a poll was taken by Fox News in February 2013, with a margin of error of 3, the majority of Democrats, Republicans and Independents approve of the use of drones to kill a suspected foreign terrorist on US soil. They also collectively disapprove of killing a suspected terrorist who is a US citizen on US soil using drones.

The same group of people were asked the question "Do you think the president of the United States, on his own, should be able to authorize the use of deadly force, such as a drone strike, to kill a suspected terrorist who is a U.S. citizen on U.S. soil?" This question was asked while Barack Obama was in office. The public answered by 32% of people saying yes, 63% of people saying no, and 5% of people saying they were unsure (margin of error of 3).

In February 2013, Fairleigh Dickinson University's PublicMind poll conducted a study to measure U.S. public opinion on the use of drones. The study was conducted nationwide, and it asked registered voters whether they "approve or disapprove of the U.S. Military using drones to carry out attacks abroad on people and other targets deemed a threat to the U.S.?" The results showed that three in every four (75%) of voters approved of the U.S. military using drones to carry out attacks, while (13%) disapproved.

Another poll in February 2013 conducted by the Huffington Post was more equivocal: 56% of Americans support using drones to kill "high-level terrorists", 13% support using drones to kill "anyone associated with terrorists", 16% thought no one should be killed with drones, and 15% were not sure.

A 2015 poll conducted by Jacquelyn Schneider and Julia Macdonald for Center for New American Security qualified some of this perceived support for drone strikes by giving respondents a chance to choose between drones, manned, neither platform, or both to conduct air strikes. They found that, while the American public was more likely to support unmanned than manned air strikes by approximately 10-15 percentage points, this support for unmanned was much less pronounced than previous polls suggested. In many cases the U.S. public supported air strikes from both manned and unmanned at similar rates.

== International opinion ==
Outside America, support for drones is far lower. A Pew Research study of 20 countries in 2012 found widespread international opposition to US drone killings. The web aggregator blog 3 Quarks Daily in partnership with the Netherlands-based Dialogue Advisory Group hosted a symposium on drone attacks in 2013.

=== Germany ===
In Germany, Ramstein Air Base has been highly controversial due to its importance to the US drone war. German journalists, civil rights activists and opposition politicians have repeatedly asked the German government about its role in US drone attacks. For years, the German government has repeatedly denied any involvement in US drone attacks and claimed to have no knowledge of such activities. In spring 2013, German media first reported that Ramstein Air Base plays a key role in directing US armed drone strikes in African and Middle Eastern countries.

Drone strikes outside of declared war zones are illegal under German and international law, calling in question the legality of Ramstein Air Base. German and American government officials subsequently attempted to downplay Germany's role in the American drone war, though leaked documents have shown that without Ramstein Air Base, US drone strikes in the Middle East and Africa would not be feasible. The Intercept and Der Spiegel published internal documents proving that the German government knew about Ramstein's role from the very beginning, but hid it from the German public and the German parliament.

In 2014, Yemenis filed a lawsuit in the Cologne Administrative Court, holding Germany partly responsible for its role in the drone attacks. One of the Yemenis said: "Without Germany, my brother-in-law and my nephew would still be alive. Without Germany, without Ramstein, the US would not be able to fly drone attacks in Yemen." Andreas Schüller, Head of International Crimes and Legal Accountability at ECCHR stated: "Ramstein is crucial to the US drone war. The German government must put a stop to its use for this - otherwise it will be complicit in the deaths of innocent civilians."

The German government responded, claiming that "whatever US forces are doing in [Ramstein Air Base] are 'independent sovereign actions of a foreign state' that do not require German authorisation or review". Civil rights activists and opposition politicians expressed their disbelief at the German government's answers, which effectively allow the US military in Germany to freely violate German law.

German opposition parties have subsequently accused the government of being "complicit in the US' illegal killings in violation of international law" and that the German government is violating parliamentary checks on its power.
