= ZALA Kub-BLA =

Kub-BLA
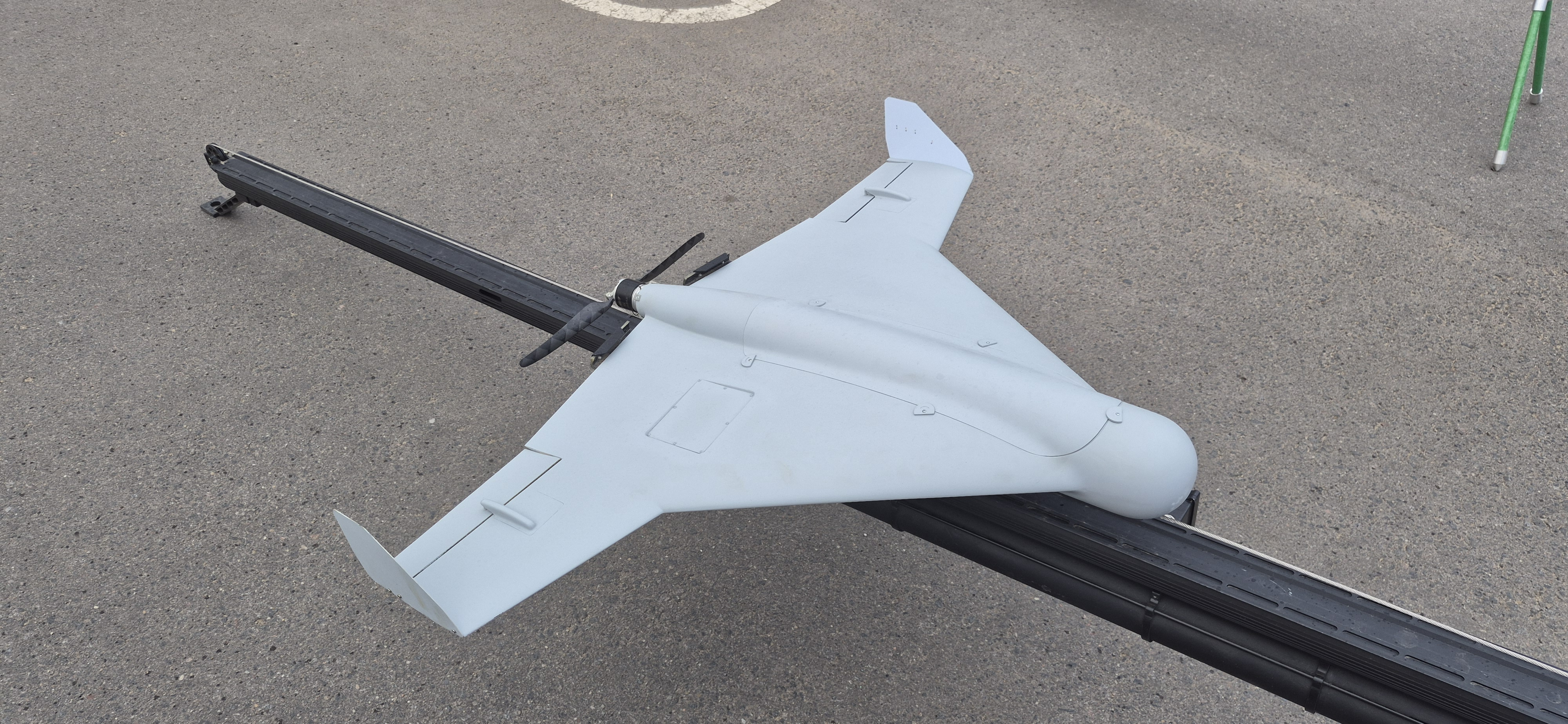
- Kub-E loitering munition
- Type: Loitering munition
- Place of origin: Russian Federation

Service history
- Used by: Russian Armed Forces
- Wars: Syrian civil war; Russian invasion of Ukraine

Production history
- Designer: ZALA Aero Group
- Manufacturer: ZALA Aero Group
- Produced: 2019-present

Specifications
- Maximum speed: 130 km/h

Kub-BLA (Russian: Куб-БЛА; also advertised as Kub-UAV) is a Russian high-precision unmanned aerial vehicle and loitering munition developed by the Russian company ZALA Aero Group (part of Kalashnikov Concern).

== Description ==
Kub-BLA was first unveiled by Kalashnikov during IDEX-2019 exhibition in Abu-Dhabi. The report notes that after launch, the drone can loiter in the air, detect a target, and then attack it from above. "Kub-BLA" delivers a payload according to target coordinates, which are set manually, or according to an image from the target guidance load. In addition, the drone can be used in swarm mode. A new version with a more powerful warhead began to be supplied in late December 2023. The Kub-10ME version, the first Russian tactical guided munition with over 100 km range, was presented in February 2026.

== Combat use ==
The drone was used against targets in the Idlib Governorate during Syrian civil war, as well as during the Russian invasion of Ukraine, in Kyiv. In May 2022, footage of an attack on a M777 howitzer by a Kub drone was posted by the Russian Ministry of Defence.

According to Lostarmour project, there have been at least 44 documented uses of Kub drones as of December 2023.

The manufacturer said in December 2025 that it has recently received licenses for the export of Kub-2 and Kub-10 models and concluded large contracts for their supply to a customer which were executed in March 2026.

== Technical characteristics ==
Specifications:

- Wingspan - 1210 mm
- Length - 950 mm
- Height - 165 mm
- Payload capacity - 3 kg
- Speed - 80-130 km/h
- Flight duration - 30 minutes

== Gallery ==
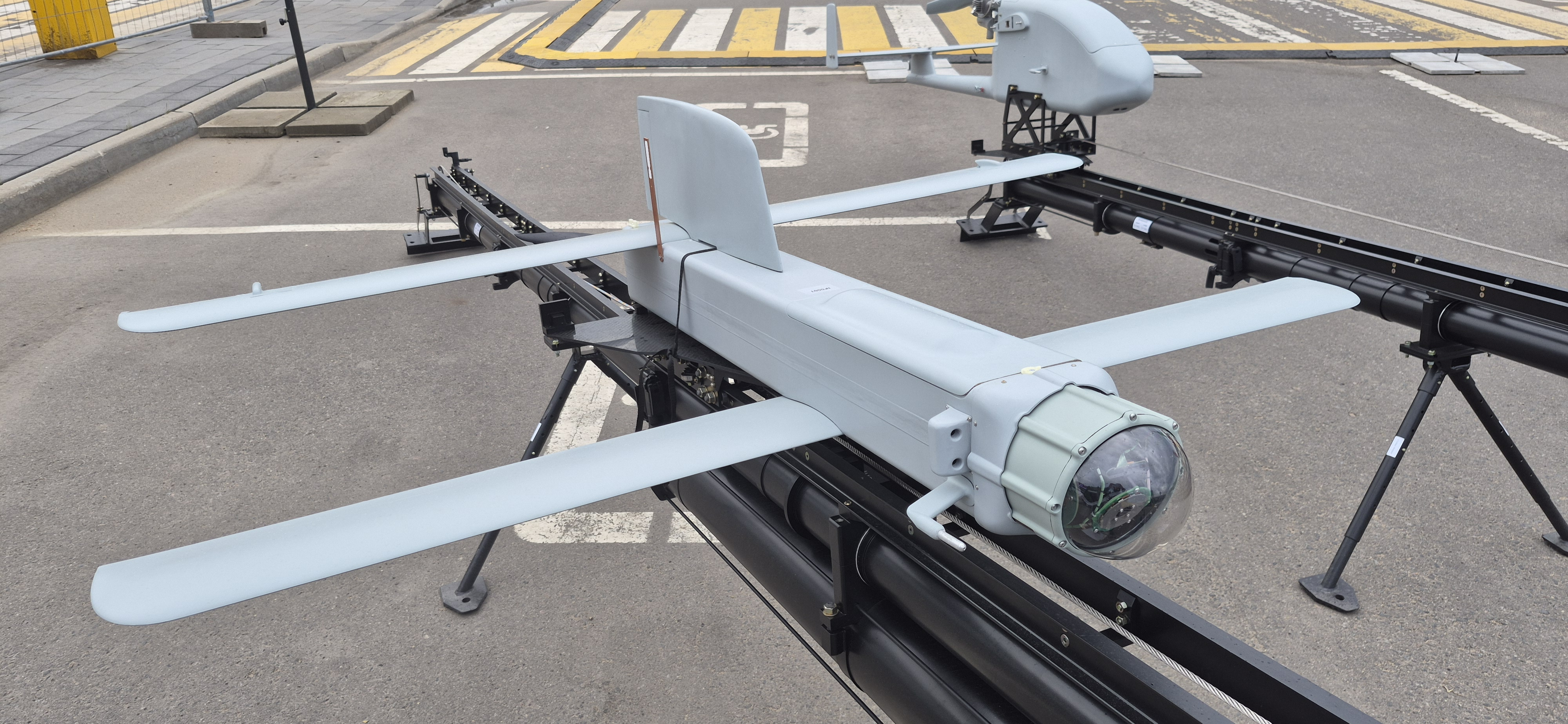
KUB-2-1E/KUB-2-2E Loitering munition

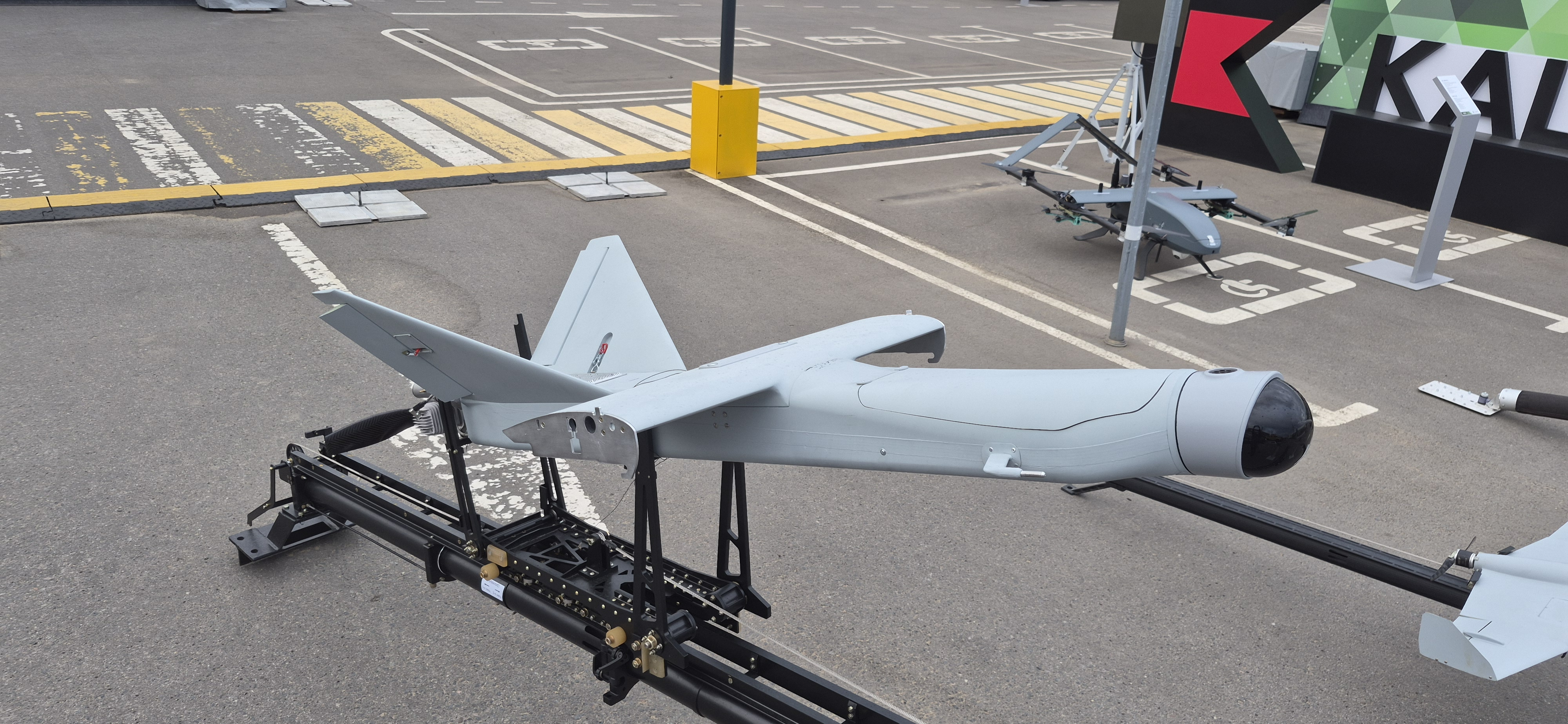
KUB-10ME UCAV

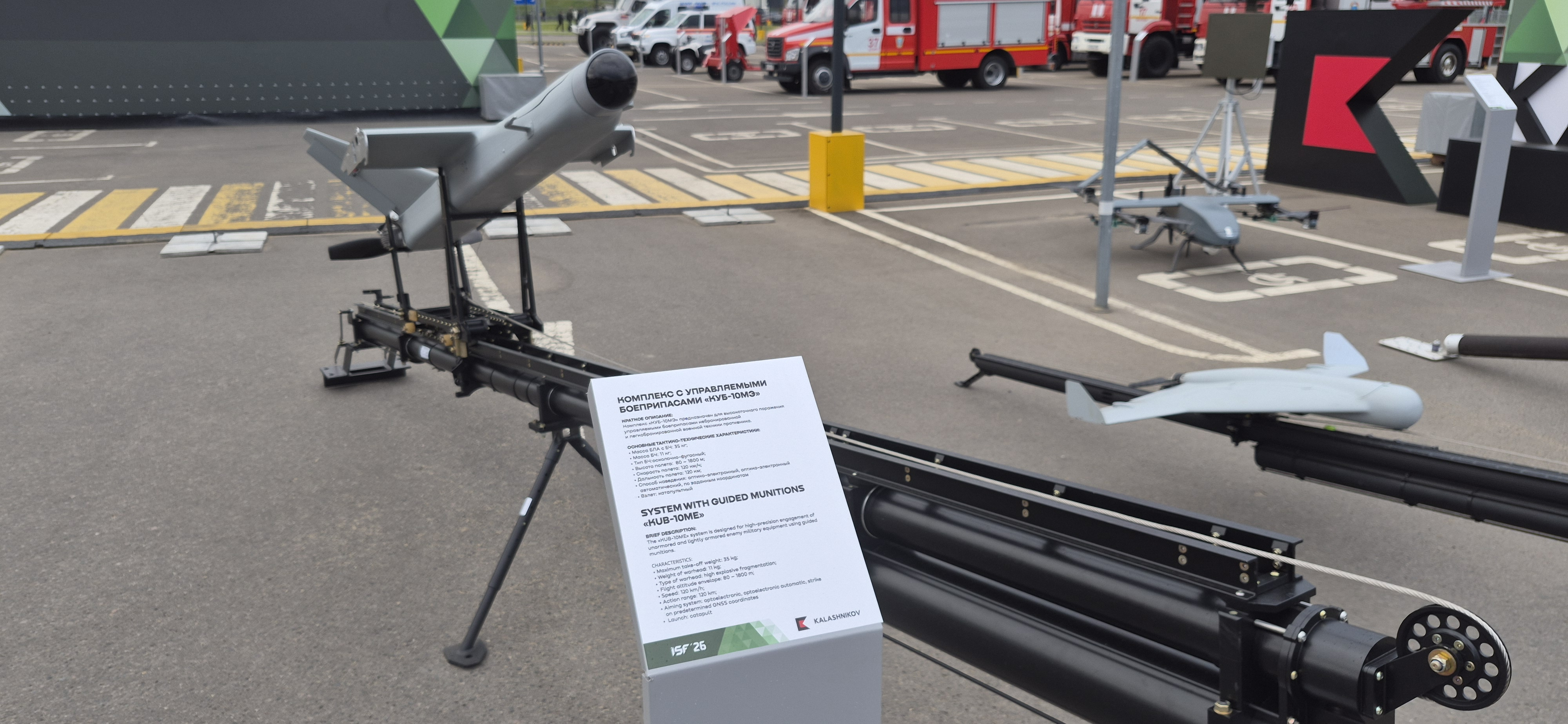
KUB-10ME UCAV

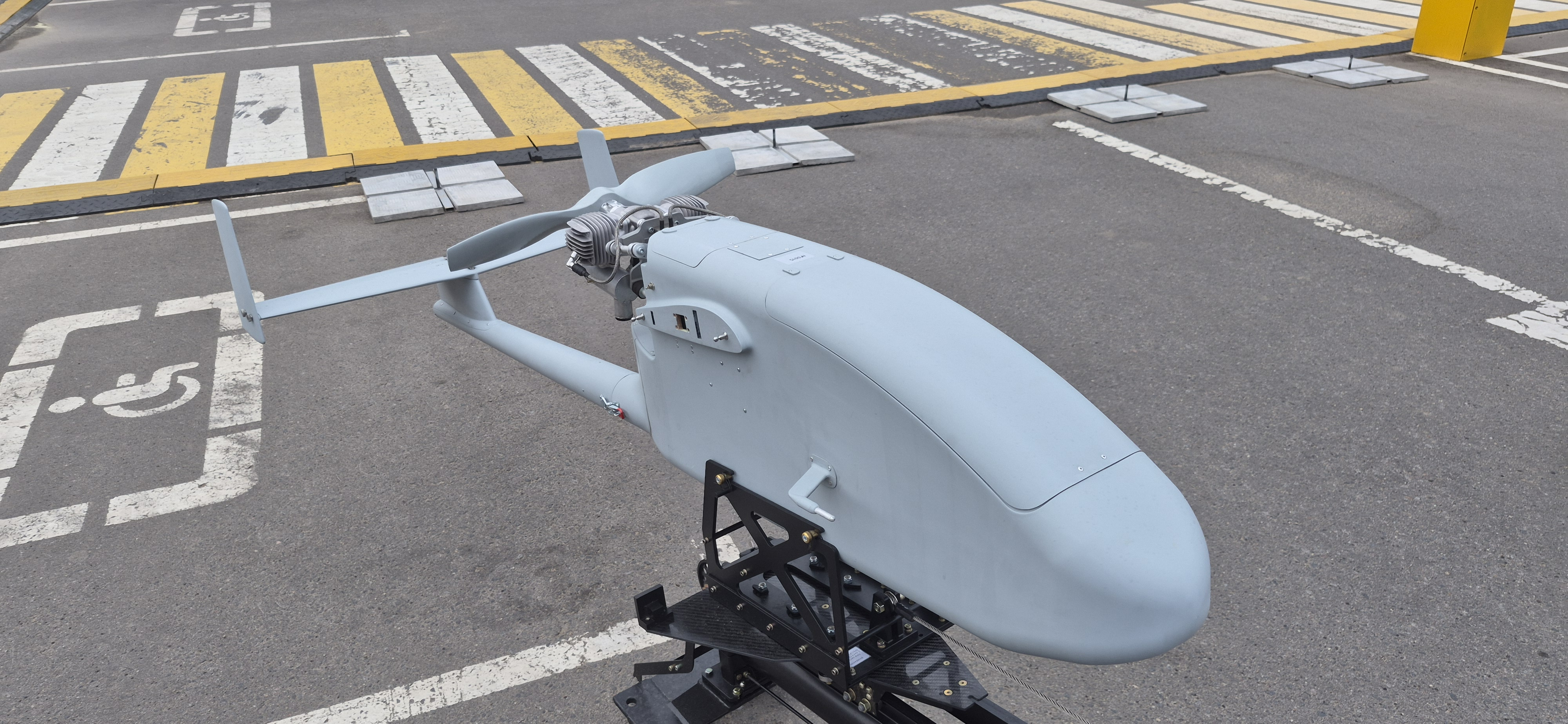
KUB-10E UCAV
