= Italmas =

- Type: Loitering munition
- Place of origin: Russia

Service history
- Used by: Russia
- Wars: Russo-Ukrainian war; Russian strikes against Ukrainian infrastructure

Production history
- Designer: ZALA Aero Group

Specifications
- Engine: DLE-60 60 cc twin boxer piston engine

Italmas (Russian: Италмас, Udmurt name for the globeflower), also known as the BM-35, is a Russian explosive suicide drone made by ZALA Aero Group.

== Design ==
The Italmas employs a simple design with plywood fuselage and a plastic bottle as fuel tank. It has a range of 200 km (120 mi) and can carry a warhead of 40 kg (88 lb).

The engine can be bought off the shelf and they can be assembled at any aeromodelling club.

Captured drones also have had a radar reflector.

== Usage ==
In October 2023, Pravda.ru reported the first combat use of Italmas, in the Russian invasion of Ukraine.
