= List of unmanned aerial vehicles in the Hellenic Armed Forces =

The Greek armed forces use drones of Greek manufacture as well as those of foreign countries. For military purposes in aviation, army, navy and port. In recent years, Greece has also started its own drone production program and, together with the purchase or rental of UAVs, has built one of the largest fleets of drones in the region.

== Space, Cyber, and Unmanned Systems ==
Another aspect of the modernization plan, is strengthening space, cyber and unmanned systems. Greece has already deployed a communications satellite and more are to come. It is constantly developing more advanced cyber defense and electronic warfare systems to hold off digital threats. Greece is adding and expanding its Achilles Shield, Centauros, Iperion and Telemachus systems with systems like the Kerveros VTOL drone, to defend against unmanned threats.

== List of drones of the Hellenic Army ==
Army air force drones(1000–1200)
Aircraft	Image	Origin	Type	Variant	Quantity	Notes	
Shield AI V - BAT		United States	Surveillance & intelligence	MQ-35A	4	2 systems, entered service in May 2025. Will be primarily used for border control. Donated by the Laskaridis Foundation.	
AeroVironment Switchblade		United States	Loitering missile	Switchblade 300, Switchblade 600	30-40	In September 2024, it was reported that Greece would buy an unknown number of Switchblade 300 and 600 loitering munitions. The cost of the programme is reported to be $75.2 million, with FMF covering $50.2 million.	
AeroVironment RQ-20 Puma		United States	Remote controlled UAS	RQ-20 Puma	20	Unknown number of RQ20B Puma AE II UAVs purchased in June 2017. Delivered by September of the same year to special operations units.	
Safran Patroller		France	Medium-altitude long-endurance UAV	B	4	On Order - Developed and manufactured.	
Aeronautics Defense Orbiter		Israel	Reconnaissance/ Fire-control system artillery guidance	Orbiter 3	17	On order.	
SAGEM Sperwer		France	Reconnaissance/ artillery guidance	B	16	Operated by Signals Corps.	
Aeronautics Defense Orbiter		Israel	Kamikaze drone	Orbiter 1K	30-40	A considerable number of Orbiter 1K drones has been purchased as of November 2024.	
Matrice 300		China	Surveillance & control	RTK	30-50	Made by DJI. Used by special forces on the border.	
EMPUSA Χ6		Greece	Surveillance & control	EMP-X6T (Tactical)	1	Made by S.A.S. Used by the 1st Raider–Paratrooper Brigade.	
ATLAS 204		Greece	Surveillance & control	204	32		Made by ALTUS LSA https://altus-lsa.com/
Small FPV (Loitering Munitions)		Greece	FPV and "kamikaze" loitering munitions.	Small FPV (Loitering Munitions)	(1000+)	The Hellenic Army has converted a military facility of mass-producing over 1,000 small, frontline drones annually, including FPV and "kamikaze" loitering munitions.	

== List of drones of the Hellenic Air Force ==
Air force drones(23)
Aircraft	Image	Origin	Type	Variant	Quantity	Notes
IAI Heron TP		Israel	Intelligence, surveillance, target acquisition, and reconnaissance	Heron 1	3	leased from Israel
EAV (HAI) Pegasus		Greece	Intelligence, surveillance, target acquisition, and reconnaissance	E1-79 Pegasus I E1-79 Pegasus II	16	
General Atomics MQ-9B		United States	Medium-altitude long-endurance unmanned aerial vehicle	SeaGuardian	3	3 on order

== List of drones of the Hellenic Navy ==
Hellenic Navy(39)
Aircraft	Image	Origin	Type	Variant	Quantity	Notes
Ucandrone Archytas		Greece	Maritime surveillance Reconnaissance		25-30	
Alpha 900 systems		United States; Spain	Maritime surveillance / reconnaissance	5 (systems) 10 × A900	Each system is composed of: 2 × A900 UAV; 1 × maritime control station; 1 × antenna	
Schiebel Camcopter S-100		Austria	Maritime surveillance / reconnaissance	4 (systems) 8 × S-100	Ordered to equip the FDI frigates and to be integrated to its combat management system (SETIS, from Naval Group). Each UAV system is composed of: 2 × S-100 UAV; 1 × Control system with: 2 × workstations; data link	

== List of drones of the Hellenic Coast Guard ==
Air force drones(1)
Aircraft	Image	Origin	Type	Variant	Quantity	Notes
IAI Heron 1		Israel	UAV	Heron 1	1	

== See also ==
- List of equipment of the Hellenic Army
- List of aircraft of the Hellenic Air Force
- List of active Hellenic Navy ships
- Hellenic Coast Guard
