= Drone killer cartridge =

Type of ammunition

A drone killer cartridge disperses a cluster of projectiles from a single rifle, automatic rifle or machine gun cartridge. These cartridges are designed to increase the probability of disabling small unmanned aerial vehicles at greater range than conventional shotguns.

== Projectiles ==
Projectiles fired by these cartridges may be either segmented or pelletized. A segmented projectile is designed to separate into spin-stabilized sub-projectiles within the gun barrel prior to reaching muzzle. A pelletized projectile contains a stack of high-density, spherical buckshot-sized pellets. The higher velocity of projectiles from rifle cartridges extends the range in comparison to shotgun cartridges. The smaller projectiles dispersed by these cartridges reduce the risk of collateral damage from projectiles that miss the target.

== History ==
Drone killer cartridges developed by Naval Surface Warfare Center Crane Division for the United States Marine Corps achieved a 92% success rate against drone targets. These cartridges are intended to make existing weapons more effective against the rapidly evolving threat of unmanned systems.

Having been developed by the federal government, manufacturers are able to license the system for government and commercial sales. As of March 2026, no manufacturer had started commercial production, although several were in discussions.

== See also ==
- Use of shotguns against drones
