= Use of shotguns against drones =

Shooting down drones with a shotgun

The use of shotguns against small low flying unmanned aerial vehicles became prevalent with the large scale use of commercial FPV drones in the Russo-Ukrainian war. Used models are the Vepr-12 and Remington Model 870 type shotguns.

Shotguns provide more effective against drones than regular rifles because of their spreading pattern of multiple projectiles. Damaging one of the propellers on a small quadcopter unbalances it, which is sufficient to make it incapable of flying.

== Adaptions ==
=== Ukraine ===
Ukraine acquired 4000 Turkish Hatsan Escort BTS-12 semi-automatic Bullpup shotguns.

=== Belgium ===
The Kleine Brogel Air Base has adapted the Benelli M4 Super 90 to counter unauthorized unmanned aerial vehicles.

== Products ==
=== Benelli M4 A.I. Drone Guardian ===
Benelli Armi released the M4 A.I. Drone Guardian, citing use against small quadcopter fpv drones. It is available in 18,5 and 26 inch barrel length.

=== Ingra Rosyanka ===
Rosyanka is an adapter for the GP-25 underbarrel grenade launcher, that's meant to fight small drones. Like the GP-25 it works as a single shot launcher, but with 12-gauge ammunition instead.

=== Skynet shotgun shell ===
Skynet shotgun shells are 12-gauge shells that contain a net, they can be launched from a regular 12ga shotgun.

== See also ==
- Drone killer cartridge
