= Unmanned aerial vehicles in the French Armed Forces =

UAVs in the Armée française are unmanned aerial vehicles (some aircraft) with reconnaissance equipment or weapons on board. The French armed forces use drones for reconnaissance and combat purposes. They are under the command of the French Air & Space Force (Armée de l’Air & de l’Espace).

== History ==
The French reconnaissance drone program began in 1995 with the purchase of four RQ-5 Hunter UAVs. The French military doctrine differentiates between contact drones with a range of up to 20 km and tactical drones with a range of 20 to 200 km; and so-called "theater drones" with ranges of 200 to 1000 km.

France has been part of a European program to research the development of the Euro MAPE RPAS since 2013. Germany, Spain and Italy are also participating in the development of this medium altitude, long endurance MALE drone. It should be ready for use in 2028.

With the EADS Harfang, France joined the NATO ISAF mission in Afghanistan. The Harfang should be replaced from 2017 by the US General Atomics MQ-9; as of 2020, France had six MQ-9s.

In 2019, the French Ministry of Defense announced that some of the drones would be used for attacks and armed in the future. In December 2019, the French Air Force flew its first drone attack in Mali. The Air Force has been using drones for attacks since.

In June 2026, Renault Group and Thales announced a strategic partnership to develop and industrialise the large-scale production of Thales’ TOUTATIS loitering munition. Under the agreement, Renault will manufacture the drones at one of its factories, with production capacity planned at 1,000 units per month starting as early as 2027.

== UAVs ==
=== Northrop Grumman RQ-5 Hunter ===
The RQ-5 Hunter were procured as reconnaissance drones in 1995.

=== EADS Harfang / IAI Heron ===
The four Harfang (French for snowy owl) drones are used by the French Air Force in Afghanistan and at Opération Serval. The drone is a further developed IAI Heron. As with the original sample from Israel Aerospace Industries, the drone is classified in the Medium Altitude Long Endurance category. While the aircraft was taken over by IAI, EADS and Thales contributed the reconnaissance equipment.

=== MQ-9 Reaper ===
The French Air Force has six MQ9 Reaper from the US company General Atomics. The MALE (medium altitude, long endurance) class drones are used in “Operation Barkhane” to combat Islamist terrorist groups. Three drones are constantly stationed in Niamey, Niger.

After the decision to arm the Reaper was to be equipped with four 250 kg laser-guided GBU-12 bombs each.
