= ZALA Aero Group =

Russian company specialising in UAV development

- Industry: Aerospace
- Founded: 2003; 23 years ago
- Headquarters: Izhevsk
- Key people: Aleksandr Zakharov
- Products: Unmanned aerial vehicles, Jammers
- Parent: ZALA
- Website: zala-aero.com

ZALA Aero Group (Note: also called A-Level Aerosystems) is a Russian defence technology company specialising in the development of unmanned aerial vehicles.

The company was founded in 2003 by Aleksandr Zakharov and is headquartered in Izhevsk. ZALA Aero has provided UAV systems for several sectors of the Russian government, including the Ministry of Defence, and has also won contracts to supply UAVs to foreign countries. The company's in-house design and production projects include a variety of systems related to UAV design, manufacture and operation, including autopilots, airframes, mechanical and pneumatic catapults, launchers, payloads and communication technologies. ZALA Aero is the only Russian company producing unmanned helicopters, portable anti-drone EW systems and a VTOL drone.

== Company ==
The Russian developer and manufacturer of unmanned aerial systems, unique payload solutions, and mobile complexes.

== History ==
ZALA Aero was founded in 2003 by Aleksandr Zakharov, Its first production UAV went to the Russian Ministry of Internal Affairs in 2006. In addition to providing aircraft for defense and military purposes, the company markets its products to the energy sector, and has contracted with Gazprom to provide UAVs to monitor over 2,000 km of the company's pipeline network. ZALA Aero has worked with Gazprom's Space Systems division to use UAVs to transmit real-time video over satellite channels.

In 2008, the ZALA 421-06 and the ZALA 421-08 completed test-flying and entered operational service. The aircraft were trialled aboard an icebreaker, participating in reconnaissance to assist the ship's work. As of 2021, the ZALA 421-08 is used by scientists in the Antarctic. In 2009, ZALA Aero reached an agreement with Turkmenistan's Ministry of Internal Affairs to supply the country with the ZALA 421-12 UAV system.

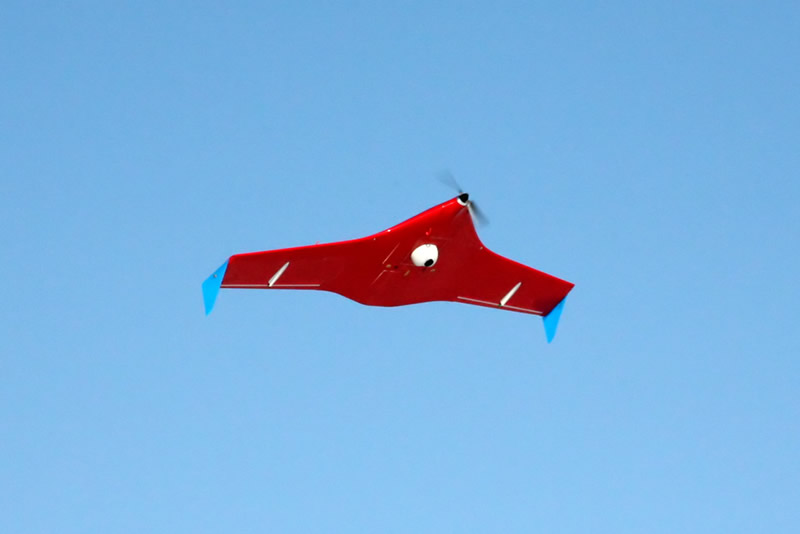
Unmanned plane ZALA 421-12

As of 2019, Russia operated over one thousand ZALA drones. In 2019, ZALA Aero developed an unmanned aerial vehicle (UAV)-borne detection system that employs artificial intelligence (AI) technology to recognise objects.

In 2021, ZALA Aero launched into serial production the ZALA 421-16E5G and developed the ZALA 421-24.

In November 2021, ZALA Aero Group signed a contract with Panamian UAV Latam for a supply of seven UAV systems in 2022–23 on eight local markets of UAV Latam. The company will help with the construction of a UAV training center as well as the preparation of local operations and other technical specialists.

ZALA drones are actively used by the Russian Arctic and Antarctic Research Institute. Use of the ZALA T-08 began in 2019, being deployed to both the North Pole and Antarctica. In 2024, the institute's fleet was expanded through the acquisition of T-16 unmanned aerial vehicles. In 2024, T-16 UAVs were used to observe the aurora borealis, in areas of high magnetic interference. In January 2026, a ZALA T-16 unmanned reconnaissance vehicle was used by the Russian Antarctic Expedition to conduct aerial observation of ice conditions and penguin colonies in the vicinity of Mirny Station. Flight parameters were established via a long range command and control link to the ZALA flight control centre in Izhevsk, a distance of over 14,000 km (8,700 miles).

== Products ==
The ZALA 421-06 is an unmanned helicopter.

The ZALA 421-08 and ZALA 421-12 UAV are conventional UAVs.

The ZALA 421-16E5G is an unmanned aircraft outfitted with a hybrid powerplant combining an electric motor and an internal combustion engine. This UAV model is used by the Russian military in Ukraine. One of them was shot down by the Ukrainian military on April 25th, 2023 and recovered two days later in a minefield.

The ZALA 421-24 is Russia's first quadcopter, which the company claims is invulnerable to electronic warfare systems.

The Kub-BLA is a military UAV that can loiter over a combat area for an extended period and allegedly identifies targets using artificial intelligence. It has a 1.2 m (3 ft 11 in) wingspan. It is fired from a portable launcher. Its top speed is 130 km/h (81 mph), which it can maintain for 30 minutes. It crashes into its target and detonates a 3 kg (6.6 lb) explosive. The loitering munition system KUB-BLA has successfully passed state tests and is recommended for adoption by the Russian army at the end of 2021.

The ZALA Lancet is a further development of the KUB-BLA. It has two versions: the bigger Lancet-3 and the smaller Lancet-1.

It was reported in September 2023 that ZALA AERO has developed a loitering munition, named Italmas, with roughly 150–200 kilometres (93–124 mi) range allowing deeper penetration into enemy areas than the Lancet. In October 2023, Pravda.ru reported the first combat use of Italmas. It's also known as the BM-35 and ZALA Z-54.

The ZALA Z-16 is a reconnaissance flying-wing UAV widely used by the Russian law enforcement agencies and special units.

The ZALA Z-20 is a reconnaissance UAV with a reported range of over 100 km which is used by the Russian forces in Ukraine to provide target designation for Lancet drones.

The ZALA Z-61 "Koschei" is a short-to-medium range reconnaissance drone which was presented in November 2026 and it is reportedly already used in Ukraine. The UAV has a fuselage made of aluminum which reportedly provides "strength and low radar visibility".

== See also ==
- Aircraft industry of Russia
- Defence industry of Russia
