= Yolka (drone interceptor) =

Russian handheld drone interceptor

Yolka (Ёлка)
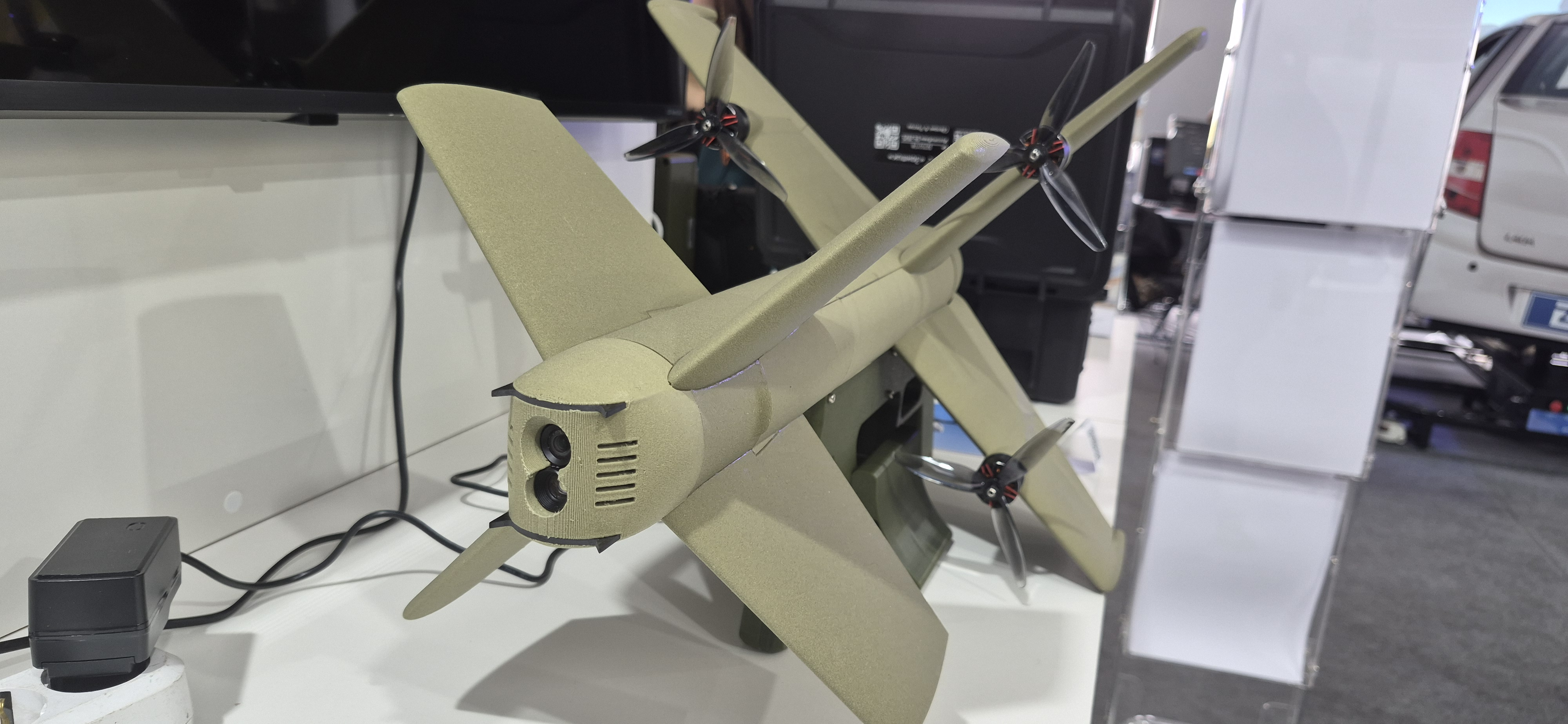
- Yolka drone interceptor
- Type: Kinetic interceptor drone
- Place of origin: Russia

Service history
- In service: 2025–present
- Wars: Russo-Ukrainian war

Production history
- Unit cost: $500 (2026)

Specifications
- Mass: 1.3 kg (2.9 lb)
- Warhead: none (kinetic interceptor)
- Operational range: 3 km (1.9 mi)
- Maximum speed: 230 km/h (140 mph)
- Guidance system: Fire-and-forget; EO+AI
- Launch platform: Handheld, man-portable

Yolka (Russian: Ёлка, lit. "Spruce") is a Russian handheld interceptor unmanned aerial vehicle (UAV) designed to counter small enemy aerial drones. It was first reported in July 2025 and has been described in Russian media as a "fire-and-forget" anti-drone system intended for frontline and point-defense use.

== Development ==
Russian media first reported on the Yolka interceptor drone in July 2025. According to Rossiyskaya Gazeta, the system is designed to autonomously track and intercept hostile drones after launch, requiring minimal operator input.

It emerged amid ongoing technological adaptations by Russian forces in response to the widespread use of small first-person view (FPV) drones in the Russo-Ukrainian war.

== Design ==
After being launched toward a detected target, the UAV reportedly uses onboard sensors and automated guidance to pursue and neutralize enemy drones without continuous manual control. Open sources have not disclosed full technical specifications, including propulsion type, operational range, or guidance architecture. Russian sources emphasize ease of use and suitability for frontline troops facing frequent drone attacks.

== Gallery ==
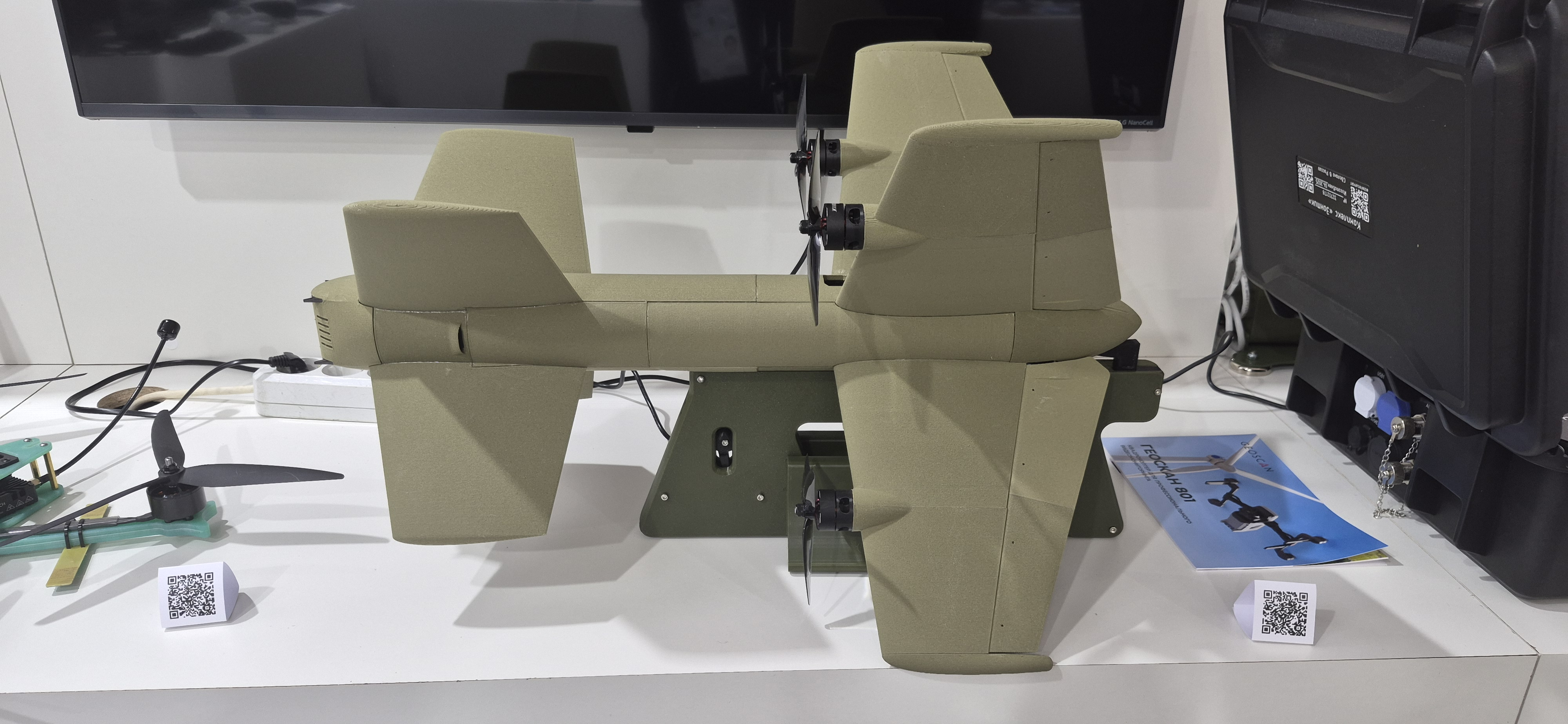

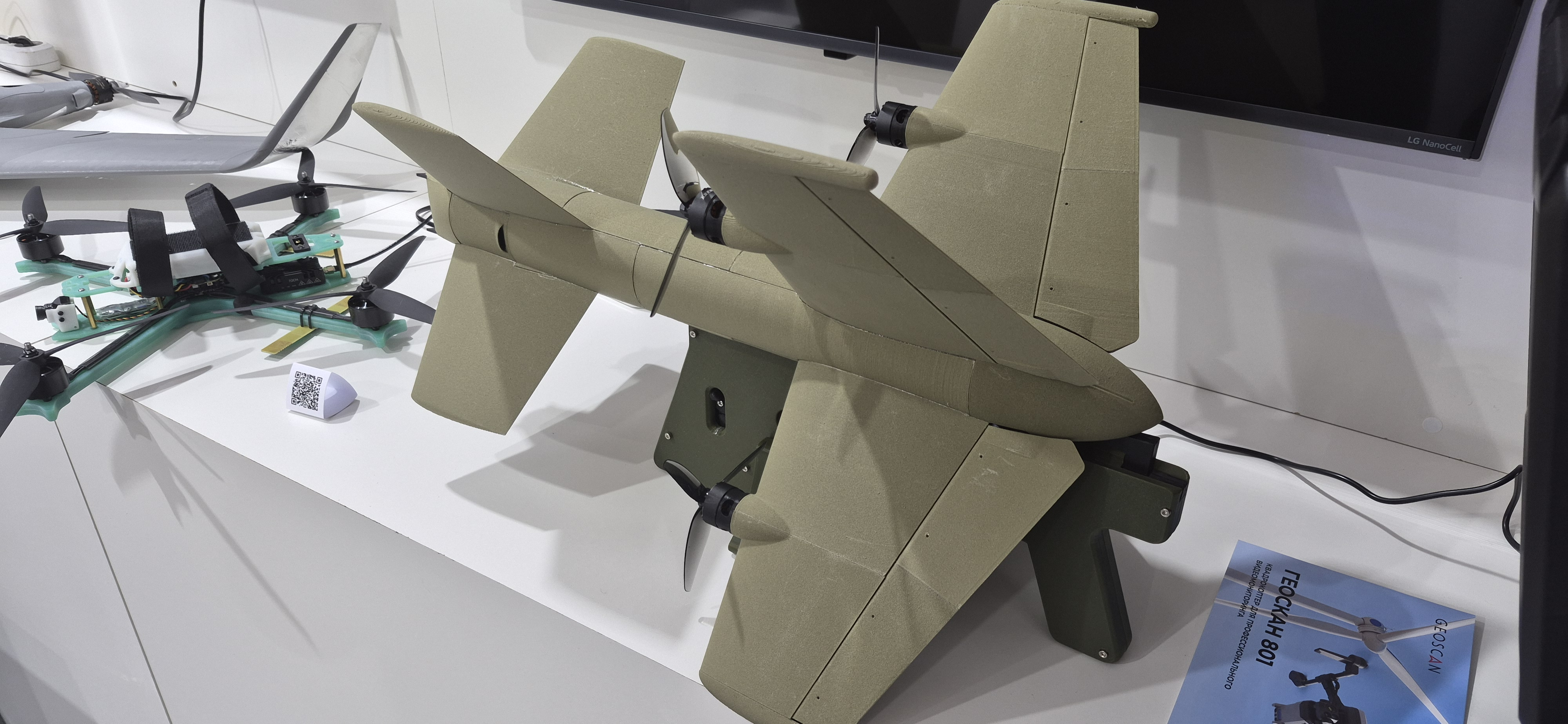

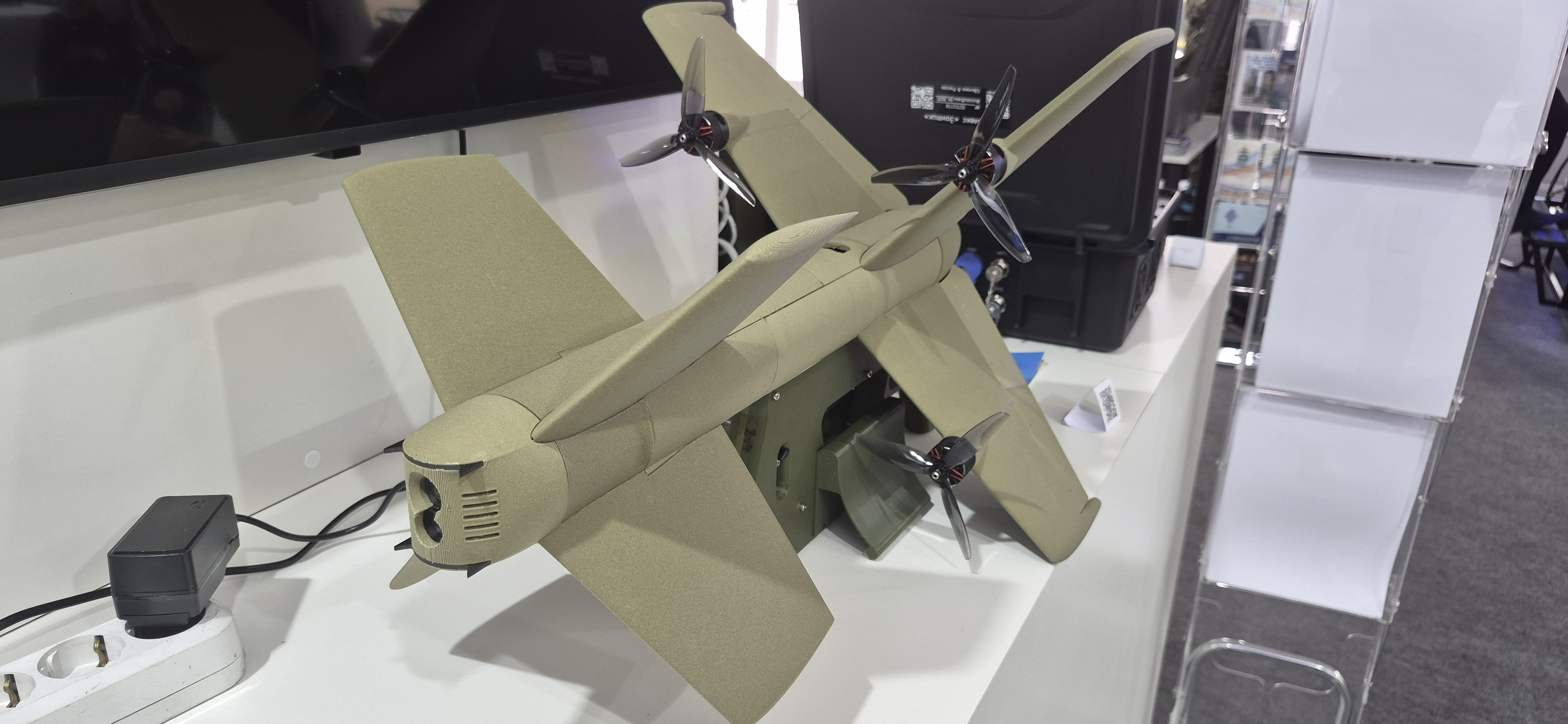

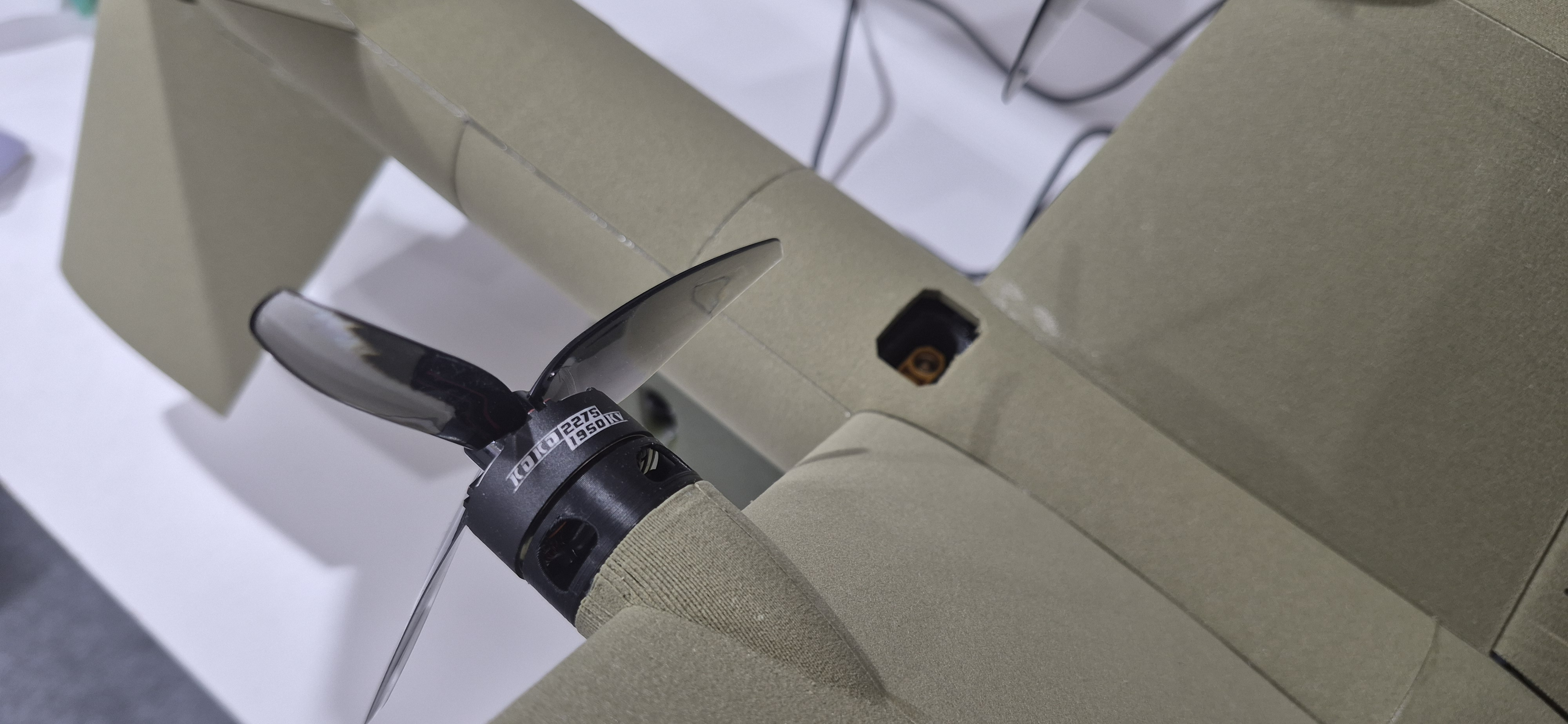
