= Dassault nEUROn =

Experimental unmanned combat aerial vehicle

nEUROn
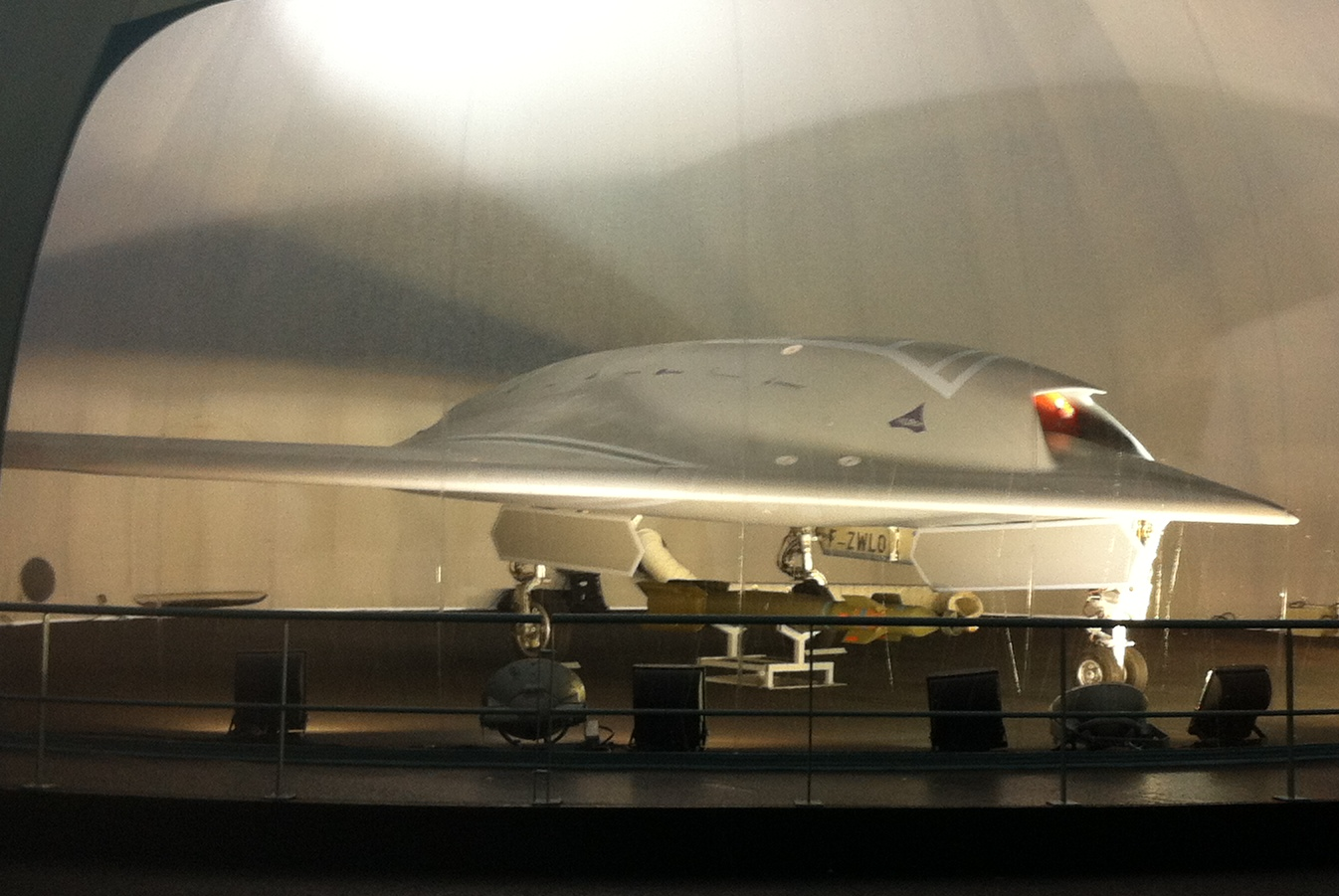
- nEUROn at Paris Air Show 2013

General information
- Type: Experimental stealth unmanned combat aerial vehicle
- National origin: European Union
- Manufacturer: Dassault Aviation
- Status: In development

History
- First flight: 1 December 2012
- Developed from: AVE-C Moyen Duc

The Dassault nEUROn is an experimental unmanned combat aerial vehicle (UCAV) being developed with international cooperation, led by the French company Dassault Aviation. Countries involved in this project include France, Greece, Italy, Spain, Sweden and Switzerland. The design goal is to create a stealthy, autonomous UAV that can function in medium-to-high threat combat zones.

The industrial goal is to give European firms experience designing and building high-end UAVs and associated technologies, in order to keep them competitive in the global marketplace. The first flight took place on December 1, 2012.

== Description ==
The Dassault nEUROn of the European doctrine is a flying wing stealth UCAV project and is in the final phase of the French Dassault LOGIDUC 3-step stealth "combat drone" programme. Until June 2005 it had the form of the original Dassault developed Grand Duc vehicle: supersonic two-engined long-range unmanned bomber, capable of performing attacks with nuclear weapons.

Under pressure of the international cooperation, especially from Sweden and Saab, it was transformed into a demonstrator of smaller single-engine technology. Thus it is now optimised for the testing of various technologies for the future UAVs and UCAVs, and will not enter serial production. It will, however, clear the way for a commercial product, which will use the technologies developed thanks to the nEUROn program. The full-scale replica of the current configuration was unveiled at the Paris Air Show 2005.

The nEUROn development, originally planned by Dassault as "AVE Grand Duc", evolved into a European cooperation including Swedish Saab AB, Greek EAB, Swiss RUAG Aerospace, Spanish EADS CASA and Italian Alenia (today Leonardo-Finmeccanica's Aircraft Division), with Dassault as the lead contractor. As a "technology demonstrator", only one vehicle will be produced to explore new operational concepts for a future generation of autonomous stealth fighter aircraft that will be produced beyond 2020. This is advocated by the statement that the industrial partners want to invest more in technology development, rather than manufacturing of the flying hardware and weapons, despite the risk of the loss of the single prototype.

However Dassault plans to primarily use the data collected by the demonstrator to produce derived UCAVs. The French maker states the nEUROn's Adour engine (adapted from the version used in the SEPECAT Jaguar) will be replaced in the production version by a more powerful, specific, engine based on Snecma's M88 from the Dassault Rafale.

According to the DGA, nEUROn test flights were planned in France, Sweden and Italy in early 2010, but were delayed. Its first flight was at the end of 2012. While nEUROn was on display at the Paris Air Show 2013, it did not fly due to reluctance by European civil aviation authorities to allow UAVs to fly out of closed airspace.

== Program goals ==
The program has three stated goals:

1. To maintain and develop the skills of the participating European aerospace companies' design offices, which will not see any other new fighter programs before 2030 now that the Rafale, Eurofighter and Gripen projects are all complete or well underway.
2. To investigate and validate the technologies needed by 2015 for designing next-generation combat aircraft.
3. To validate an innovative cooperation process by establishing a European industry team responsible for developing next-generation combat aircraft.

== Platform ==
As a UCAV, nEUROn will be significantly larger and more advanced than other well-known UAV systems like the MQ-1 Predator, with ranges, payloads and capabilities that approach those of manned fighter aircraft. Although the project is not yet closely defined, illustrations and statements by the consortium partners indicate that the nEUROn is envisioned as a competitive system with the American J-UCAS program's Boeing X-45C or Northrop-Grumman X-47B.

Saab's February 9, 2006 release notes that nEUROn will be a demonstrator measuring 10 m long by 12 m wide and weighing in at 5 tons. This is roughly the size of a Mirage 2000 fighter rotated 90 degrees (as the nEUROn is wider than it is long). The aircraft will have unmanned autonomous air-to-ground attack capabilities with precision guided munitions, relying on an advanced stealth airframe design to penetrate undetected. Another feature being contemplated is the ability to control squad flight in automatic mode from an advanced fighter like the Rafale or JAS 39 Gripen platform, grouping the nEUROns and controlling the group in a manner similar to many combat real-time strategy computer games.

== Project history ==
In 1999, Dassault Aviation launched its LOGIDUC stealth UCAV program, which gave birth to the Dassault AVE-D Petit Duc that flew in July 2000 as the first stealth UAV in Europe, and to the Dassault AVE-C Moyen Duc (2001). Dassault changed the third phase name "Grand Duc" – a full-scale advanced version of the Moyen Duc – to the more European sounding nEUROn, as the French project was joined by European partners to reduce its development cost. Great Britain didn't join because it was already involved with an American similar program, neither Germany who desisted officially because the country was unable to afford the financial participation.

During the 2003 Paris Air Show, French Minister of Defence Mme Michèle Alliot-Marie announced a major agreement signed between the French groups EADS France, Dassault Aviation and Thales. The agreement covered a joint-venture to "realise a new unmanned military technology that covers all future activity in combat and strategic reconnaissance aeronautics" i.e. LOGIDUC's phase three, "Grand Duc".

EADS leads a HALE (High Altitude, Long Endurance) UAV project.

Meanwhile, the French defence procurement agency, DGA, acting as the program executive on behalf of the participating countries, has entrusted development of the first nEUROn UCAV demonstrator to Dassault Aviation and its European partners. Sub-contracts have been made with the French industrial firms Thales and EADS France and also with five European firms, Saab (Sweden), EAB (Greece), Alenia (Italy), RUAG Aerospace (Switzerland) and EADS CASA (Spain).

Chief project manager Thierry Prunier comes from Dassault Aviation, and the deputy project managers are Mats Ohlson of Saab and Ermanno Bertolina of Alenia. There is a single link between the executive agency (DGA) and the prime contractor (Dassault), and it will be up to the executive agency to coordinate with the government agencies of the participating countries. It will be up to the prime contractor, meanwhile, to coordinate the work with the other industries.

After Spain joined the programme in early February 2006 (Belgium could join later), work breakdown among the European industrial partners was planned as follows:

- Dassault Aviation

Lead builder
Overall architectures & design
Flight control system
Final assembly
Global testing (static & flight)

Dassault claims 50% of development and is responsible for the standalone LOGIDUC programme. The nEUROn (2010) will be the third Dassault stealth UAV prototype following the AVE-D Petit Duc (2000) & AVE-C Moyen Duc (2004). The nEUROn project replaces the LOGIDUC final phase AVE Grand Duc.

- Alenia Aeronautica, today Leonardo-Finmeccanica's Aircraft Division: (joined in mid-2005)

Weapon firing system
Smart Integrated Weapon Bay
Air data system
Electrical system
Flight testing

Thanks to the technologies developed for the UAV prototype Sky-x (2003) Alenia Aeronautica was the first industrial partner and claims a 25% share of the entire programme.

- Saab AB: (joined on December 22, 2005)

Overall design
Equipped fuselage
Avionics
Fuel system
Flight testing

Saab claims 25% of development and is also the coordinator for the other Swedish corporations involved.

- EADS CASA: (joined on February 7, 2006)

Wing
Ground control station
Data-link integration

- Hellenic Aerospace Industry: (joined on January 11, 2006)

Rear fuselage
Tail pipe
Integration bench
Engine
Air to Air Missile
Communication System

- RUAG: (joined in mid-2005)

Wind tunnel tests
Weapons carriage

- Thales: (joined on June 14, 2005)

Data-link (STANAG 7085 compliant)
Command interface

- EADS France: (joined in June 2003)

Undisclosed

=== Flight testing ===
The nEUROn made its first flight on December 1, 2012, in France. Flight trials in France to open its flight envelope and evaluate its stealth characteristics were successfully completed in March 2015. These tests were followed by sensor evaluation trials in Italy, which were completed on August 25, 2015. The last leg of flight trials take place in Sweden and will include live fire trials.

In July 2016, extensive stealth and detection tests were conducted with the nEUROn and the Charles de Gaulle carrier group. The nEUROn was to penetrate the aircraft carrier defensive area to test its stealth and the capacity of the carrier group to detect it.

At the end of 2016 and in early 2017, the furtivity performance test have been undertaken, with more than 130 flights. Since 2019, the nEUROn has carried out test flights at the Istres Air Base, to increase the operational use scenarios and confrontation campaigns regarding threats.

== Funding ==
The contract is valued at €405 million, and allows industry to begin a three-year system definition and design phase with related low-observability studies. This phase will be followed by the development and assembly phase, and by a first flight in 2011. It is planned that the 2-year flight-test program (2010–2012) will entail about 100 sorties, including the launch of a laser-guided bomb tentatively scheduled for 2012. The initial €400 million budget was increased by €5 million in 2006 due to the addition of a modular bomb bay including a designator and a laser-guided bomb.

In February 2006, DGA had announced that France will provide €202.5 million, half of the program's €405 million ($480 million) budget, while the remaining funds will be supplied by the other participating member nations. In December 2005, the Swedish defence ministry reported the national share would be €75 million, of which €66 million would be financed by Saab AB. The cost of Spain's participation to the program is estimated at €35.5 million, spread over the 2007–2012 period.

Derived production UCAV unit cost is estimated by Dassault to be €25 million.

The French Ministry of Armed Forces will invest 128 million euros in 2024 to develop an unmanned combat aerial vehicle, based on the Neuron demonstrator.

== Potential French-British follow-on ==
In November 2014, a two-year feasibility study was announced by the French and British governments. This could lead to a program combining the experience of the BAE Systems Taranis and nEUROn programs into a Future Combat Air System.

== Specifications ==
Data from

General characteristics

- Crew: 0
- Length: 9.5 m (31 ft 2 in)
- Wingspan: 12.5 m (41 ft 0 in)
- Empty weight: 4,900 kg (10,803 lb)
- Gross weight: 7,000 kg (15,432 lb)
- Powerplant: 1 × Rolls-Royce/Turboméca Adour , 40 kN (8,992 lbf) thrust

Performance

- Maximum speed: 980 km/h (609 mph, 529 kn)
- Service ceiling: 14,000 m (45,900 ft)

Armament

- 2 × 230 kg (500 lb) guided bombs

== See also ==
- Dassault LOGIDUC

Related development

- Dassault AVE-D Petit Duc
- Dassault AVE-C Moyen Duc

Aircraft of comparable role, configuration, and era

- AVIC 601-S
- BAE Corax
- BAE Taranis
- Boeing Phantom Ray
- Boeing X-45
- DRDO Ghatak
- EADS Barracuda
- Hongdu GJ-11
- Lockheed Martin Polecat
- Mikoyan Skat
- Northrop Grumman X-47A Pegasus
- Northrop Grumman X-47B
- Sukhoi Okhotnik
- TAI Anka-3

Related lists

- List of unmanned aerial vehicles
