= 2010 Manx Grand Prix =

(Isle of Man) 2010 Manx Grand Prix
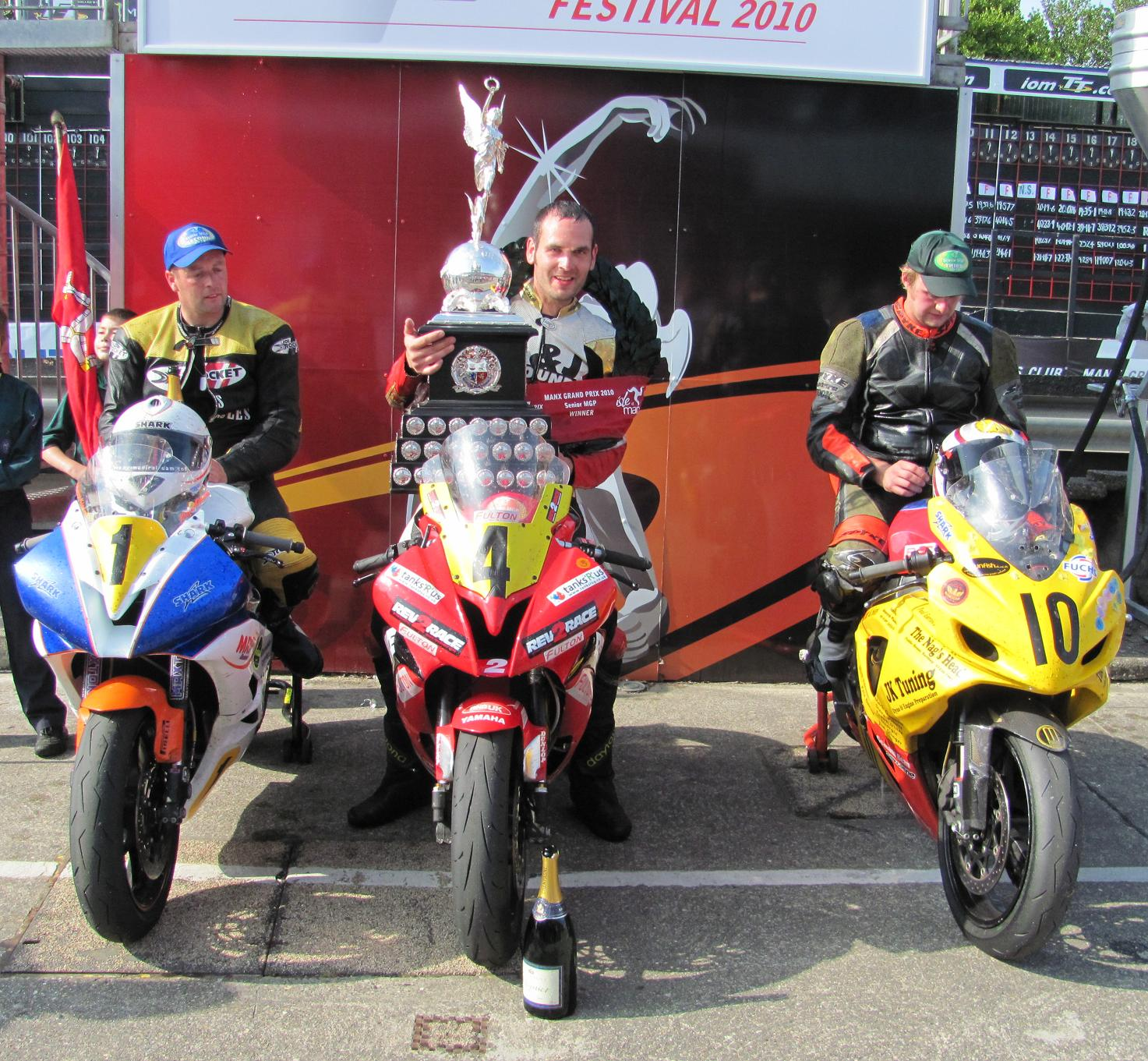
- Wayne Kirwan (1), Ivan Lintin (10) & Simon Fulton (4) the winner of the Senior Manx Grand Prix – Friday 4 September 2010.

Race details
Date	21 August – 3 Sep 2010
Location	Douglas, Isle of Man
Course	Road Course; 37.733 mi (60.725 km)

The 2010 Manx Grand Prix races were held between Saturday 21 August and Friday 3 September 2010 on the 37.733-mile Mountain Course.

The Blue Riband event of Manx Grand Prix Race week was won by Simon Fulton claiming victory in the Senior Manx Grand Prix including a lap at an average speed of 120.119 mph. A double was completed by Roy Richardson winning the Senior Classic and Junior Classic races with Peter Wakefield winning the Classic Lightweight class and Chris McGahan the winner of the inaugural Formula Classic Race. The Newcomers Race provided a double win for local Isle of Man competitors with Tim Venables the overall winner and Jonny Heginbotham winning the Class B event. The Post Classic Race was dominated by Michael Dunlop, the overall winner with Chris Palmer first in the Class (ii) Post Classic Junior race. The combined Lightweight Manx Grand Prix produced two new winners for perennial Manx Grand Prix competitors Neil Kent and also Philip McGurk in the Ultra-Lightweight class. During the Junior Manx Grand Prix, two competitors crashed fatally at Alpine Cottage on lap 2. The Junior Manx Grand Prix was declared a result after 1 lap and Michael Sweeney the winner after Simon Fulton received a 10-second race penalty and demoted to third place.

== Practice ==
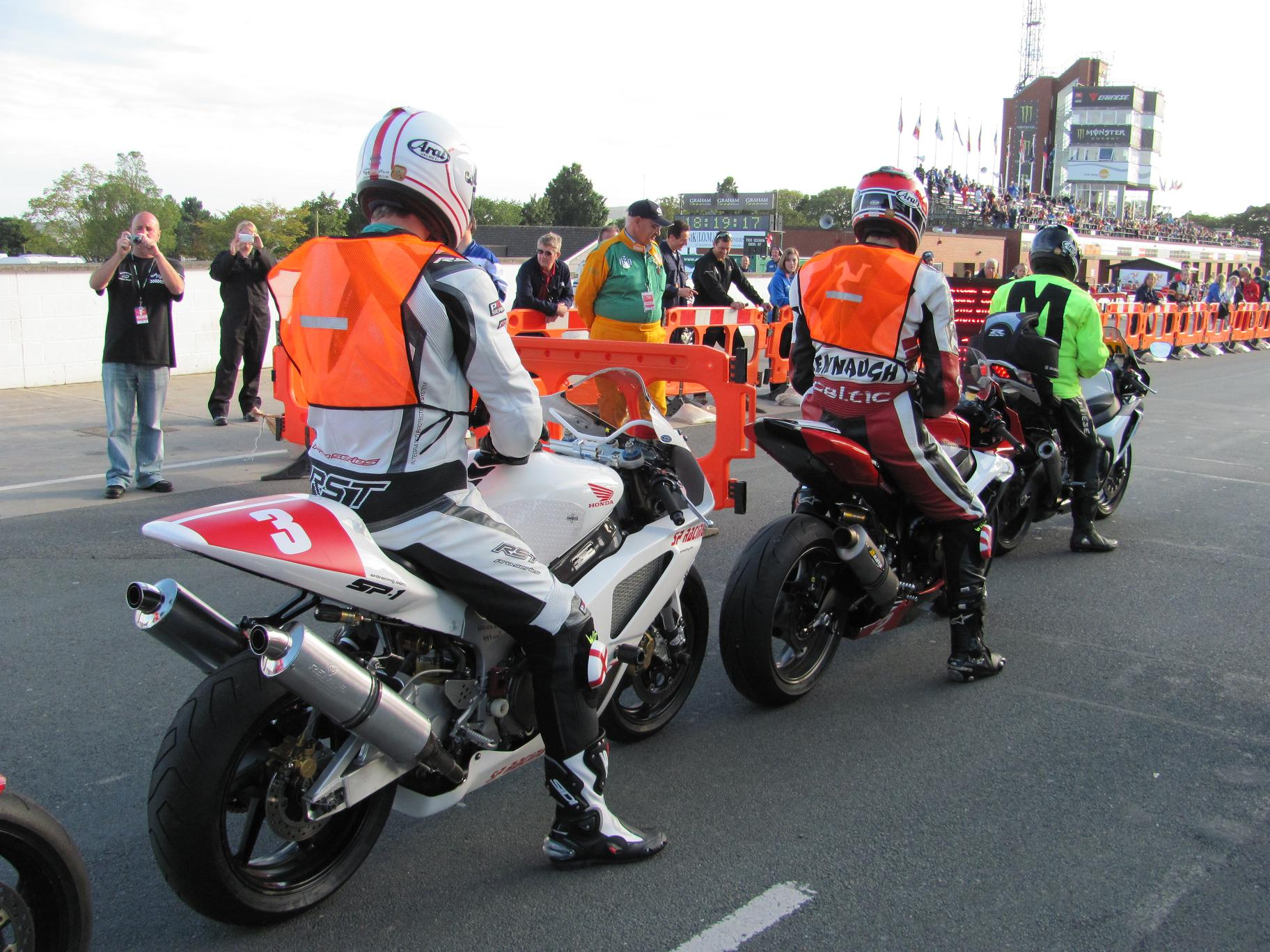
Competitors at the TT Grandstand wait for the start of the delayed Newcomers Speed Control Lap – Saturday 21 August 2010.

The first practice session for the 2010 Manx Grand Prix including the Newcomers Speed Control Lap was scheduled for 17:20 pm on Saturday 21 August 2010. The public roads that form the Snaefell Mountain Course closing 1 hour earlier at 17:00 pm for the first time at a Manx Grand Prix meeting. The start of the Newcomers Speed Control Lap was delayed over 1 hour due to clearing showers and low mist on the Mountain Section of the course. The familiarisation lap started at 18:28 pm with 41 new competitors escorted in small groups by three TT Travelling Marshals accompanied with experienced former Manx Grand Prix competitors including Nigel Beattie, Mark Parrett, Carolynn Sells, Isle of Man TT Liaison Officer John Barton and Isle of Man TT winner Chris Palmer. The untimed practice session for the Junior and Senior classes started at 18:50 pm followed by the Lightweight and Classic machines at 19:20 pm with practice ending at 20:05 pm. The Newcomer Osmo Partti from Finland crashed at Sulby Bridge and was uninjured during the first practice session and Colin Martin was evacuated by the Airmed Helicopter to Nobles Hospital after an accident at Cruickshanks Corner in Ramsey.

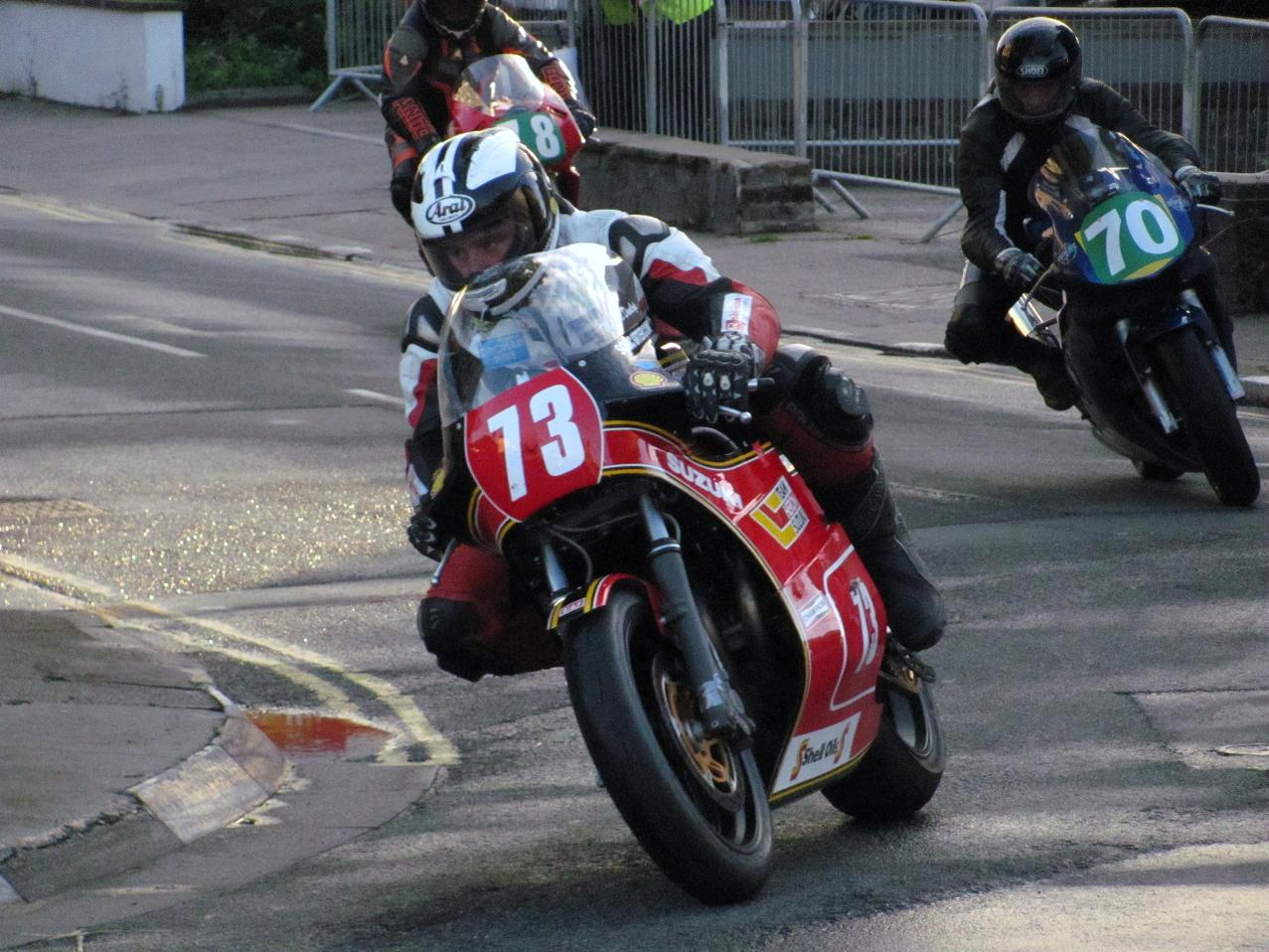
Michael Dunlop 997cc Suzuki XR69 at Parliament Square, Ramsey on the second Manx Grand Prix practice session – Monday 23 August 2010.

The second practice session on Monday 23 August 2010 was held in bluster conditions and early evening rain showers that left wet roads all round the Mountain Course. Despite the conditions, the fastest lap of the session was set by local Isle of Man competitor John Smyth in 21 minutes and 45.78 seconds at an average speed of 104.021 mph. The Senior Classic class was led by Olie Linsdell riding a 500c Paton recording a time at an average speed of 100.327 mph and Michael Dunlop set the fastest time in the Post Classic with a time of 24 minutes and 28.12 seconds an average speed of 92.518 mph riding a 997 cc Suzuki XR69 motorcycle. The fastest time in the Newcomers class 'A' was set by Andy Fenton riding a 600 cc Yamaha in 21 minutes and 58.61 seconds an average speed of 103.009 mph and Dan Sayle led the Lightweight class with an average speed of 96.022 mph. Minor incidents reported during the Monday evening practice session included Steve Hodgson and Tim Venables at the Gooseneck and Adam Easton at Bedstead Corner.

The Tuesday evening practice session on 24 August 2010 is held in better weather conditions with dry roads on the course with strong cross-winds on the Mountain Section. The session was delayed until 18:35 pm to allow an ambulance to attend to a domestic emergency, crossing the course at Parliament Square, Ramsey. The better conditions produced fastest times with Simon Fulton leading the Senior and Junior Manx Grand Prix classes with a time of 19 minutes and 19.83 seconds an average speed of 104.021 mph. The Senior Classic is further dominated by Olie Linsdell riding a 500 cc Paton motorcycle with a time of 20 minutes and 47.34 seconds increasing his average speed to 108.894 mph and Dan Sayle sets an average speed of 112.409 mph to lead the Lightweight class. The Newcomer's 'A' class leaderboard is led by Andy Fenton with a time of 19 minutes and 57.44 seconds an average speed of 113.432 mph and Jonny Heginbotham records an average speed of 105.037 riding a 650 cc Kawasaki ER6 to lead the Newcomer's 'B' class. The Post Senior Classic it is Olie Lindsdell riding a 746 cc Yamaha FZ motorcycle that sets the fastest with a time of 20 minutes and 34.41 seconds and an average speed of 110.035 mph and Mark Buckley setting the second fastest time with an average speed of 109.680 riding a 997 cc Suzuki XR69 motorcycle. A similar livered Suzuki XR69 ridden by Michael Dunlop records an average speed of 106.725 mph and suffers mechanical failure on the second lap of practice and stops at Parliament Square, Ramsey. The Finnish newcomer Osmo Partti, has a second minor incident at Sarah's Cottage and Wayne Martin has accident at Whitegates as is evacuated to Nobles Hospital by Airmed Helicopter. Further minor incidents during Tuesday evening practice session include Gary Fowler at the Water Works Corner and Darryl McGeown at Governor's Bridge.

== Results ==
=== Practice Times ===
==== 2010 Senior Manx Grand Prix Practice Times & Leaderboard ====
- Plates; Black on Yellow.

Rank	Rider	Sat 21 Aug	Mon 23 Aug	Tues 24 Aug	Wed 25 Aug	Thurs 26 Aug	Fri 27 Aug	Sat 28 Aug
1	(Republic of Ireland) Michael Sweeney; 600 cc Yamaha	Untimed; Practice	26' 57.82; 89.957 mph	19' 29.69; 116.123 mph	19' 17.77; 104.021 mph	19' 00.92; 119.051 mph	18' 54.41; 119.734 mph	—— No Time
2	(Isle of Man) Simon Fulton; 599 cc Yamaha	Untimed; Practice	23' 31.88; 96.203 mph	19' 19.83; 117.110 mph	19' 13.11; 117.793 mph	19' 03.33; 118.800 mph	18' 59.25; 119.226 mph	—— No Time
3	(Republic of Ireland) Wayne Kirwan; 600 cc Yamaha	Untimed; Practice	22' 38.60; 99.977 mph	19' 38.41; 115.386 mph	19' 29.39; 116.153 mph	19' 06.92; 118.429 mph	19' 08.49; 118.267 mph	—— No Time
4	(Isle of Man) Dan Sayle; 600 cc Yamaha	Untimed; Practice	23' 08.44; 97.828 mph	20' 03.70; 112.842 mph	—— No Time	19' 09.10; 119.204 mph	19' 24.69; 116.622 mph	21' 40.20; 104.467 mph
5	(England) Andrew Brady; 748 cc Suzuki	Untimed; Practice	—— No Time	19' 22.55; 116.836 mph	19' 34.24; 115.673 mph	—— No Time	19' 09.88; 118.123 mph	—— No Time
6	(England) Ivan Lintin; 750 cc Suzuki	Untimed; Practice	19' 24.69; 116.622 mph	19' 37.17; 115.386 mph	19' 20.32; 117.061 mph	19' 15.30; 117.570 mph	—— No Time	—— No Time
7	(Republic of Ireland) David Lumsden; 600 cc Yamaha	Untimed; Practice	24' 38.98; 91.839 mph	20' 28.61; 110.554 mph	20' 09.25; 112.324 mph	19' 19.68; 117.125 mph	19' 15.66; 117.553 mph	—— No Time
8	(England) Jules Croft; 600c Honda	Untimed; Practice	25' 45.94; 87.961 mph	20' 03.37; 112.873 mph	20' 10.73; 112.187 mph	19' 52.18; 113.932 mph	19' 28.57; 116.234 mph	—— No Time
9	(England) Philip McGurk; 600 cc Honda	Untimed; Practice	23' 43.94; 95.389 mph	19' 48.52; 115.386 mph	19' 50.42; 115.386 mph	19' 36.97; 115.405 mph	19' 38.87; 115.219 mph	—— No Time
10	(Northern Ireland) Stephen McKnight; 599 cc Yamaha	Untimed; Practice	23' 08.68; 97.811 mph	20' 24.84; 110.894 mph	20' 08.43; 112.401 mph	19' 47.23; 114.407 mph	19' 46.36; 114.491 mph	—— No Time
11	(England) Grant Wagstaff; 749 cc Suzuki	Untimed; Practice	22' 03.28; 102.645 mph	20' 21.23; 111.222 mph	19' 50.39; 114.103 mph	—— No Time	19' 49.48; 114.191 mph	—— No Time
12	(Northern Ireland) Shaun Anderson; 750 cc Suzuki	Untimed; Practice	—— No Time	20' 47.83; 108.851 mph	20' 28.34; 110.579 mph	20' 06.39; 112.591 mph	19' 50.67; 114.077 mph	22' 45.53; 99.469 mph
13	(Isle of Man) Dave Moffitt; 600 cc Honda	Untimed; Practice	24' 26.35; 92.630 mph	20' 52.96; 108.406 mph	19' 53.18; 113.837 mph	19' 40.40; 115.570 mph	19' 50.82; 114.062 mph	—— No Time
14	(Isle of Man) Tim Venables; 600 cc Honda	Untimed; Practice	—— No Time	20' 49.46; 108.709 mph	20' 11.23; 112.141 mph	20' 05.19; 112.703 mph	19' 52.29; 113.922 mph	23' 32.62; 96.153 mph
15	(Isle of Man) Paul Smyth; 600 cc Yamaha	Untimed; Practice	21' 45.78; 104.021 mph	20' 32.93; 110.167 mph	20' 30.08; 110.422 mph	19' 57.51; 113.426 mph	20' 13.71; 111.912 mph	21' 17.59; 106.316 mph
16	(Isle of Man) Jon Kennaugh; 750 cc Suzuki	Untimed; Practice	23' 48.49; 95.085 mph	21' 06.84; 107.218 mph	20' 30.93; 110.346 mph	20' 36.14; 109.881 mph	20' 02.90; 112.917 mph	23' 41.65; 95.542 mph
17	(Norway) Sebastian Buch; 600 cc Yamaha	Untimed; Practice	24' 09.96; 93.677 mph	20' 58.89; 107.895 mph	20' 30.47; 110.388 mph	20' 17.58; 111.556 mph	20' 04.99; 112.722 mph	24' 11.51; 93.577 mph
18	(Republic of Ireland) Andrew Farrell; 750 cc Suzuki	Untimed; Practice	23' 48.60; 95.077 mph	—— No Time	20' 20.84; 111.258 mph	—— No Time	20' 04.57; 112.761 mph	—— No Time
19	(England) Ross Johnson; 600 cc Yamaha	Untimed; Practice	26' 23.91; 85.755 mph	20' 35.56; 109.932 mph	20' 25.54; 110.831 mph	20' 09.55; 112.297 mph	20' 21.07; 111.237 mph	—— No Time
20	(England) Mike Minns; 750 cc Suzuki	Untimed; Practice	27' 02.03; 102.419 mph	20' 10.22; 112.234 mph	20' 17.65; 111.549 mph	—— No Time	—— No Time	—— No Time

==== 2010 Junior Manx Grand Prix Practice Times & Leaderboard ====
- Plates; White on Blue.

Rank	Rider	Sat 21 Aug	Mon 23 Aug	Tues 24 Aug	Wed 25 Aug	Thurs 26 Aug	Fri 27 Aug	Sat 29 Aug
1	(Republic of Ireland) Michael Sweeney; 600 cc Yamaha	Untimed; Practice	26' 57.82; 89.957 mph	19' 29.69; 116.123 mph	19' 17.77; 104.021 mph	19' 00.92; 119.051 mph	18' 54.41; 119.734 mph	—— No Time
2	(Isle of Man) Simon Fulton; 599 cc Yamaha	Untimed; Practice	23' 31.88; 96.203 mph	19' 19.83; 117.110 mph	19' 13.11; 117.793 mph	19' 03.33; 118.800 mph	18' 59.25; 119.226 mph	—— No Time
3	(Republic of Ireland) Wayne Kirwan; 600 cc Yamaha	Untimed; Practice	22' 38.60; 99.977 mph	19' 38.41; 115.386 mph	19' 29.39; 116.153 mph	19' 06.92; 118.429 mph	19' 08.49; 118.267 mph	—— No Time
4	(Isle of Man) Dan Sayle; 600 cc Yamaha	Untimed; Practice	23' 08.44; 97.828 mph	20' 03.70; 112.842 mph	—— No Time	19' 09.10; 119.204 mph	19' 24.69; 116.622 mph	21' 40.20; 104.467 mph
5	(Republic of Ireland) David Lumsden; 600 cc Yamaha	Untimed; Practice	24' 38.98; 91.839 mph	20' 28.61; 110.554 mph	20' 09.25; 112.324 mph	19' 19.68; 117.125 mph	19' 15.66; 117.553 mph	—— No Time
6	(England) Andrew Brady; 599 cc Honda	Untimed; Practice	—— No Time	20' 31.13; 110.328 mph	20' 38.38; 109.682 mph	19' 21.45; 116.947 mph	19' 36.65; 115.436 mph	—— No Time
7	(England) Jules Croft; 600c Honda	Untimed; Practice	25' 45.94; 87.961 mph	20' 03.37; 112.873 mph	20' 10.73; 112.187 mph	19' 52.18; 113.932 mph	19' 28.57; 116.234 mph	—— No Time
8	(England) Philip McGurk; 600 cc Honda	Untimed; Practice	23' 43.94; 95.389 mph	19' 48.52; 115.386 mph	19' 50.42; 115.386 mph	19' 36.97; 115.405 mph	19' 38.87; 115.219 mph	—— No Time
9	(Isle of Man) Andy Fenton; 600 cc Yamaha	Untimed; Practice	21' 58.61; 103.009 mph	19' 57.44; 113.432 mph	19' 59.98; 113.192 mph	19' 50.53; 114.090 mph	19' 41.91; 114.992 mph	—— No Time
10	(Northern Ireland) Stephen McKnight; 599 cc Yamaha	Untimed; Practice	23' 08.68; 97.811 mph	20' 24.84; 110.894 mph	20' 08.43; 112.401 mph	19' 47.23; 114.407 mph	19' 46.36; 114.491 mph	—— No Time

==== 2010 Senior Classic Practice Times and Leaderboard ====
- Plates; White digits on Black race plates.
- Classic Machines 351 cc-500 cc

Rank	Rider	Sat 21 Aug	Mon 23 Aug	Tues 24 Aug	Wed 25 Aug	Thurs 26 Aug	Fri 27 Aug	Sat 28 Aug
1	(England) Oliver Linsdell; 500 cc Paton	Untimed; Practice	22' 33.85; 100.327 mph	20' 47.34; 108.894 mph	—— No Time	20' 14.59; 111.830 mph	—— No Time	—— No Time
2	(England) Alan Oversby; 498 cc MV Agusta	Untimed; Practice	24' 20.65; 92.991 mph	21' 52.37; 103.498 mph	21' 30.87; 105.222 mph	21' 14.92; 106.539 mph	21' 11.44; 106.830 mph	—— No Time
3	(Scotland) Wattie Brown; 498 cc Manx Petty	Untimed; Practice	24' 00.19; 94.312 mph	25' 07.51; 91.101 mph	23' 08.22; 97.843 mph	22' 08.81; 102.218 mph	23' 23.03; 96.811 mph	25' 35.27; 88.472 mph
4	(England) Roy Richardson; 497 cc Aermacchi	Untimed; Practice	—— No Time	—— No Time	22' 20.47; 101.329 mph	—— No Time	—— No Time	25' 52.90; 87.467 mph
5	(England) Mark Herbertson; 500 cc Matchless	Untimed; Practice	23' 50.83; 94.929 mph	—— No Time	22' 22.19; 101.199 mph	—— No Time	—— No Time	—— No Time
6	(England) Steve Linsdell; 499 cc Royal Enfield Seeley	Untimed; Practice	25' 10.74; 89.909 mph	22' 36.00; 100.168 mph	22' 55.22; 98.768 mph	—— No Time	22' 48.69; 99.239 mph	—— No Time
7	(England) Paul Coward; 492 cc Nourish Weslake	Untimed; Practice	24' 20.01; 93.032 mph	22' 52.00; 99.000 mph	24' 00.37; 94.301 mph	—— No Time	—— No Time	24' 16.15; 93.279 mph
8	(England) Mark Parrett; 500 cc Matchless	Untimed; Practice	24' 33.37; 92.188 mph	—— No Time	23' 02.93; 98.217 mph	54' 19.05; 41.677 mph	—— No Time	—— No Time
9	(Wales) Meredydd Owen; 498 cc Seeley MkII	Untimed; Practice	25' 03.19; 90.360 mph	—— No Time	—— No Time	23' 11.10; 97.641 mph	—— No Time	—— No Time
10	(Wales) Bob Owen; 500 cc Seeley G50	Untimed; Practice	25' 14.12; 89.708 mph	—— No Time	23' 33.76; 96.076 mph	23' 13.36; 97.482 mph	23' 15.28; 97.348 mph	—— No Time

==== 2010 Junior Classic Practice Times and Leaderboard ====
- Plates; Black digits on White race plates.
- Class A Classic Machines 300 cc-350 cc

Rank	Rider	Sat 21 Aug	Mon 23 Aug	Tues 24 Aug	Wed 25 Aug	Thurs 26 Aug	Fri 27 Aug	Sat 28 Aug
1	(England) Roy Richardson; 349 cc Aermacchi	Untimed; Practice	—— No Time	—— No Time	—— No Time	22' 11.47; 102.014 mph	—— No Time	—— No Time
2	(England) Chris Palmer; 350 cc AJS	Untimed; Practice	24' 45.71; 91.423 mph	—— No Time	23' 09.18; 97.776 mph	23' 13.39; 97.480 mph	—— No Time	—— No Time
3	(England) Mark Parrett; 350 cc Honda	Untimed; Practice	25' 22.35; 89.223 mph	23' 17.95; 97.162 mph	23' 09.82; 97.731 mph	—— No Time	—— No Time	—— No Time
4	(England) Chris McGahan; 346 cc Honda	Untimed; Practice	—— No Time	—— No Time	23' 27.13; 96.529 mph	23' 22.74; 96.830 mph	23' 19.44; 97.059 mph	—— No Time
5	(England) Alan Oversby; 348 cc MV Agusta	Untimed; Practice	24' 36.86; 91.971 mph	—— No Time	23' 22.12; 96.873 mph	—— No Time	—— No Time	25' 04.94; 9.255 mph
6	(England) Mark Herbertson; 350 cc AJS	Untimed; Practice	25' 22.35; 89.223 mph	23' 39.85; 95.664 mph	—— No Time	23' 28.52; 96.433 mph	—— No Time	—— No Time
7	(England) Doug Snow; 340 cc Ducati	Untimed; Practice	—— No Time	—— No Time	24' 02.12; 94.186 mph	23' 32.99; 96.128 mph	—— No Time	—— No Time
8	(Northern Ireland) Davy Morgan; 350 cc Honda	Untimed; Practice	—— No Time	24' 56.80; 90.745 mph	25' 40.51; 88.171 mph	24' 09.02; 93.738 mph	—— No Time	—— No Time
9	(Northern Ireland) Nigel Moore; 348 cc Honda	Untimed; Practice	25' 52.52; 87.489 mph	—— No Time	—— No Time	—— No Time	24' 18.14; 93.152 mph	—— No Time
10	(Isle of Man) David Madsen-Mygdal; 350 cc Honda	Untimed; Practice	26' 16.38; 86.165 mph	—— No Time	25' 10.96; 89.895 mph	24' 32.98; 92.213 mph	—— No Time	26' 43.93; 84.685 mph

==== 2010 Lightweight Manx Grand Prix Practice Times & Leaderboard ====
- Class A Machines 201 cc-250 cc

Rank	Rider	Sat 21 Aug	Mon 23 Aug	Tues 24 Aug	Wed 25 Aug	Thurs 26 Aug	Fri 27 Aug	Sat 29 Aug
1	(Isle of Man) Dan Sayle; 250 cc Honda	Untimed; Practice	23' 34.55; 96.022 mph	20' 08.34; 112.409 mph	19' 45.20; 114.603 mph	19' 43.42; 114.776 mph	19' 25.91; 116.500 mph	—— No Time
2	(England) Neil Kent; 250 cc Yamaha	Untimed; Practice	23' 59.95; 94.328 mph	20' 55.08; 108.223 mph	20' 12.27; 112.044 mph	20' 16.65; 111.641 mph	20' 27.09; 110.691 mph	27' 38.40; 81.903 mph
3	(England) Roy Richardson; 249 cc Yamaha	Untimed; Practice	24' 30.41; 92.374 mph	20' 26.79; 110.718 mph	—— No Time	21' 43.13; 104.232 mph	—— No Time	—— No Time
4	(Northern Ireland) Nigel Moore; 250 cc Honda	Untimed; Practice	24' 00.81; 94.272 mph	20' 56.25; 108.122 mph	20' 43.95; 108.122 mph	—— No Time	—— No Time	—— No Time
5	(Northern Ireland) Davy Morgan; 250 cc Honda	Untimed; Practice	—— No Time	—— No Time	—— No Time	—— No Time	20' 58.50; 107.929 mph	—— No Time
6	(England) Stuart Garton; 250 cc Yamaha	Untimed; Practice	25' 02.86; 90.380 mph	—— No Time	20' 58.09; 107.964 mph	20' 58.26; 107.949 mph	—— No Time	—— No Time
7	(England) Tom Snow; 250 cc Honda	Untimed; Practice	24' 42.96; 91.592 mph	21' 18.87; 106.209 mph	21' 05.83; 107.304 mph	21' 07.32; 107.177 mph	—— No Time	—— No Time
8	(England) Phil Harvey; 250 cc Honda	Untimed; Practice	—— No Time	21' 10.25; 106.930 mph	21' 15.61; 106.481 mph	—— No Time	21' 09.64; 106.981 mph	27' 38.40; 81.903 mph
9	(Isle of Man) Dean Martin; 250 cc Honda	Untimed; Practice	—— No Time	—— No Time	—— No Time	21' 50.38; 103.655 mph	—— No Time	—— No Time
10	(England) Carl Roberts; 250 cc Yamaha	Untimed; Practice	—— No Time	22' 06.22; 102.417 mph	—— No Time	—— No Time	—— No Time	—— No Time

==== 2010 Post Classic Senior Class Practice Times and Leaderboard ====
- Plates; White digits on Red race plates.
- Class (i)
- Classic Machines 601 cc-1050 cc Four-stroke motorcycles.
- 351 cc-750 cc Two-stroke motorcycles.

Rank	Rider	Sat 21 Aug	Mon 23 Aug	Tues 24 Aug	Wed 25 Aug	Thurs 26 Aug	Fri 27 Aug	Sat 28 Aug
1	(Northern Ireland) Michael Dunlop; 997cc Suzuki XR69	Untimed; Practice	24' 28.12; 92.518 mph	21' 12.70; 106.725 mph	19' 40.12; 115.097 mph	19' 11.80; 117.927 mph	18' 55.78; 119.590 mph	22' 47.27; 99.3435 mph
2	(England) Oliver Linsdell; 746 cc Yamaha FZ	Untimed; Practice	—— No Time	20' 34.41; 110.035 mph	19' 41.82; 114.931 mph	—— No Time	—— No Time	—— No Time
3	(Scotland) Mark Buckley; 997 cc Suzuki XR69	Untimed; Practice	24' 30.82; 92.349 mph	20' 38.40; 109.680 mph	20' 24.55; 110.920 mph	20' 45.21; 109.081 mph	20' 02.56; 112.949 mph	22' 40.04; 99.871 mph
4	(Isle of Man) John Barton; 749 cc Suzuki GSX-R	Untimed; Practice	—— No Time	21' 18.05; 106.278 mph	20' 59.91; 107.808 mph	20' 56.01; 108.143 mph	20' 35.96; 109.897 mph	—— No Time
5	(England) Mick Godfrey; 1000 cc Suzuki GSX-R	Untimed; Practice	27' 09.87; 83.337 mph	22' 07.70; 102.303 mph	22' 20.01; 101.363 mph	21' 13.75; 106.636 mph	—— No Time	24' 07.75; 93.820 mph
6	(England) Neil Vicars; 750 cc Suzuki GSX-R	Untimed; Practice	24' 39.44; 91.811 mph	—— No Time	22' 35.91; 100.175 mph	21' 58.65; 103.005 mph	22' 23.97; 101.065 mph	—— No Time
7	(England) David Taylor; 1000 cc Suzuki GS	Untimed; Practice	26' 04.68; 86.809 mph	23' 39.23; 95.706 mph	23' 02.31; 98.262 mph	22' 03.33; 98.189 mph	23' 06.12; 97.992 mph	—— No Time
8	(England) Andy Lovett; 750 cc Suzuki	Untimed; Practice	—— No Time	—— No Time	23' 40.76; 99.817 mph	22' 28.61; 100.717 mph	22' 05.33; 102.486 mph	25' 88.494; 110.035 mph
9	(England) Geoff Martin; 750 cc Suzuki	Untimed; Practice	—— No Time	22' 43.21; 99.639 mph	23' 23.80; 96.758 mph	22' 05.58; 102.467 mph	23' 33.97; 96.061 mph	26' 01.51; 86.985 mph
10	(England) Maria Costello; 997 cc Suzuki XR69	Untimed; Practice	26' 24.22; 85.738 mph	24' 26.19; 92.640 mph	23' 00.07; 98.421 mph	22' 13.34; 101.870 mph	22' 36.63; 100.122 mph	25' 22.92; 88.189 mph

==== 2010 Newcomers Race 'A' Practice Times and Leaderboard ====
- Plates; White digits on Red race plates
- Class A
- 550 cc-750 cc Four-stroke Four-cylinder motorcycles.
- 651 cc-1000 cc Four-stroke Twin-cylinder motorcycles.
- 601 cc-675 cc Four-stroke Three-cylinder motorcycles.
- 601 cc-1000 cc Rotary motorcycles.

Rank	Rider	Sat 21 Aug	Mon 23 Aug	Tues 24 Aug	Wed 25 Aug	Thurs 26 Aug	Fri 27 Aug	Sat 28 Aug
1	(Isle of Man) Andy Fenton; 600 cc Yamaha	Untimed; Practice	21' 58.61; 103.009 mph	19' 57.44; 113.432 mph	19' 59.98; 113.192 mph	19' 50.53; 114.090 mph	19' 41.91; 114.922 mph	—— No Time
2	(England) James Coward; 600 cc Yamaha	Untimed; Practice	23' 22.43; 96.852 mph	20' 46.35; 108.981 mph	20' 41.21; 109.432 mph	20' 08.79; 112.367 mph	19' 46.70; 114.459 mph	22' 43.36; 99.627 mph
3	(Northern Ireland) Shaun Anderson; 750 cc Suzuki	Untimed; Practice	24' 24.44; 92.751 mph	20' 47.83; 108.851 mph	20' 28.34; 110.579 mph	20' 06.39; 112.591 mph	19' 50.67; 114.077 mph	22' 45.53; 99.469 mph
4	(Isle of Man) Tim Venables; 600 cc Honda	Untimed; Practice	—— No Time	20' 49.46; 108.709 mph	20' 11.23; 112.141 mph	20' 05.19; 112.703 mph	19' 52.29; 113.922 mph	23' 32.62; 96.153 mph
5	(Isle of Man) Jon Kennaugh; 750 cc Suzuki	Untimed; Practice	23' 48.49; 95.085 mph	21' 06.84; 107.218 mph	20' 30.93; 110.346 mph	20' 36.14; 109.881 mph	20' 02.90; 112.917 mph	23' 41.65; 95.542 mph
6	(Norway) Sebastian Buch; 600 cc Yamaha	Untimed; Practice	24' 09.96; 93.677 mph	20' 58.89; 107.895 mph	20' 30.47; 110.388 mph	20' 17.58; 111.556 mph	20' 04.99; 112.722 mph	24' 11.51; 93.577 mph
7	(Italy) Tommaso Totti; 600 cc Yamaha	Untimed; Practice	24' 38.87; 91.846 mph	22' 09.44; 93.840 mph	21' 38.19; 104.629 mph	20' 47.61; 108.871 mph	20' 23.66; 111.002 mph	—— No Time
8	(Republic of Ireland) Billy Byrne; 600 cc Honda	Untimed; Practice	23' 02.47; 98.250 mph	21' 13.17; 106.685 mph	20' 50.62; 108.609 mph	20' 53.89; 108.325 mph	20' 30.61; 110.375 mph	23' 12.93; 97.512 mph
9	(England) Robert Simcock; 750 cc Suzuki	Untimed; Practice	24' 24.44; 92.751 mph	21' 06.16; 107.275 mph	—— No Time	—— No Time	20' 47.48; 108.882 mph	—— No Time
10	(Scotland) John Thomson; 599 cc Yamaha	Untimed; Practice	26' 32.92; 85.270 mph	—— No Time	22' 32.90; 100.398 mph	—— No Time	21' 27.69; 105.482 mph	—— No Time

==== 2010 Newcomers Race 'B' Practice Times and Leaderboard ====
- Plates; White digits on Red race plates
- Class B
- 251 cc-400 cc Four-stroke Four-cylinder motorcycles.
- Up to 650 cc Four-stroke Twin-cylinder motorcycles.

Rank	Rider	Sat 21 Aug	Mon 23 Aug	Tues 24 Aug	Wed 25 Aug	Thurs 26 Aug	Fri 27 Aug	Sat 28 Aug
1	(Isle of Man) Lee Darbyshire; 400 cc ZXR Kawasaki	Untimed; Practice	24' 38.74; 91.854 mph	22' 48.02; 92.288 mph	22' 17.53; 101.552 mph	21' 34.04; 104.965 mph	21' 27.47; 105.500 mph	—— No Time
2	(Isle of Man) Jonny Heginbotham; 650 cc SV Suzuki	Untimed; Practice	—— No Time	21' 33.15; 105.037 mph	—— No Time	—— No Time	22' 32.09; 100.458 mph	—— No Time
3	(England) Scott Campbell; 650 cc SV Suzuki	Untimed; Practice	24' 03.67; 94.085 mph	22' 36.14; 100.158 mph	22' 17.53; 101.550 mph	21' 50.45; 103.650 mph	22' 01.06; 102.818 mph	—— No Time
4	(England) Tom Llewelyn; 650 cc SV Suzuki	Untimed; Practice	24' 26.78; 92.603 mph	24' 03.94; 94.068 mph	22' 57.04; 98.638 mph	22' 18.29; 101.494 mph	22' 02.25; 102.7250 mph	23' 34.36; 96.035 mph
5	(Republic of Ireland) Mick Jordan; 400 cc Honda	Untimed; Practice	26' 02.64; 86.922 mph	23' 12.05; 97.574 mph	22' 33.15; 100.379 mph	22' 12.48; 101.936 mph	22' 39.99; 99.874 mph	—— No Time
6	(England) Adrian Cox; 650 cc SV Suzuki	Untimed; Practice	26' 06.01; 86.735 mph	23' 40.35; 95.630 mph	23' 11.56; 97.609 mph	22' 34.96; 100.245 mph	22' 51.28; 99.052 mph	—— No Time
7	(England) Tony Limer; 398 cc Kawasaki	Untimed; Practice	26' 25.61; 85.663 mph	23' 37.75; 95.805 mph	23' 43.53; 95.409 mph	22' 57.69; 95.409 mph	22' 51.24; 99.055 mph	27' 08.51; 83.406 mph
8	(England) Richard Gelder; 649 cc SV Suzuki	Untimed; Practice	25' 42.53; 88.056 mph	23' 57.20; 94.509 mph	24' 20.14; 93.024 mph	23' 55.33; 94.632 mph	23' 19.11; 97.082 mph	25' 54.63; 87.370 mph
9	(Northern Ireland) Martin Lyons; 650 cc SV Suzuki	Untimed; Practice	25' 41.08; 88.1387 mph	23' 37.16; 95.845 mph	23' 42.68; 95.474 mph	23' 29.44; 96.370 mph	23' 19.30; 97.048 mph	30' 49.57; 73.438 mph
10	(England) Yono Yardley; 645 cc SV Suzuki	Untimed; Practice	25' 39.64; 93.840 mph	25' 07.32; 90.112 mph	24' 42.73; 91.607 mph	23' 36.04; 95.291 mph	23' 30.85; 96.274 mph	25' 07.25; 90.117 mph

=== Race results ===
==== Race 1a; Newcomers Race 'A' ====
Monday 30 August 2010 Mountain Course 4 laps – 150.92 miles (242.80 km)

- Class A
- 550 cc-750 cc Four-stroke Four-cylinder motorcycles.
- 651 cc-1000 cc Four-stroke Twin-cylinder motorcycles.
- 601 cc-675 cc Four-stroke Three-cylinder motorcycles.
- 601 cc-1000 cc Rotary motorcycles.

Rank	Rider	Team	Speed	Time
1	(Isle of Man) Tim Venables	600 cc Honda	114.071 mph	1:19.22.93
2	(Northern Ireland) Shaun Anderson	750 cc Honda	113.834 mph	1:19.32.86
3	(Norway) Sebastian Buch	600 cc Yamaha	112.717 mph	1:20.20.14
4	(England) James Coward	600 cc Yamaha	112.452 mph	1:20.31.49
5	(Isle of Man) Jon Kennaugh	750 cc Suzuki	111.779 mph	1:21.00.60
6	(Republic of Ireland) Billy Byrne	600 cc Honda	111.614 mph	1:21.07.79
7	(Italy) Tommaso Totti	600 cc Honda	108.442 mph	1:23.30.18
8	(England) Robert Simcock	750 cc Suzuki	108.413 mph	1:23.31.49
9	(Northern Ireland) David Sleith	749 cc Suzuki	104.502 mph	1:26.39.07
10	(Isle of Man) Darran Creer	600 cc Honda	103.821 mph	1:27.13.16

==== Race 1a; Newcomers Race 'B' ====
Monday 30 August 2010 Mountain Course 4 laps – 150.92 miles (242.80 km)

- Class B
- 251 cc-400 cc Four-stroke Four-cylinder motorcycles.
- Up to 650 cc Four-stroke Twin-cylinder motorcycles.

Rank	Rider	Team	Speed	Time
1	(Isle of Man) Jonny Heginbotham	650 cc Kawasaki	107.472 mph	1:24.15.40
2	(Isle of Man) Lee Darbyshire	650 cc Kawasaki	113.834 mph	1:19.32.86
3	(England) Tom Llewelyn	650 cc Suzuki	104.242 mph	1:26.52.04
4	(Republic of Ireland) Gerard Daniel	650 cc Suzuki	101.626 mph	1:29.06.18
5	(Republic of Ireland) Mick Jordon	400 cc Honda	101.070 mph	1:29.35.60
6	(England) Adrian Cox	650 cc Suzuki	100.468 mph	1:30.07.83
7	(England) Jono Yardley	645 cc Suzuki	98.112 mph	1:32.17.66
8	(England) Richard Gelder	649 cc Suzuki	97.328 mph	1:33.02.25
9	(England) Stephen Sweetman	650 cc Suzuki	96.936 mph	1:33.24.83
10	(Germany) Alfred Stark	620 cc Ducati	95.860 mph	1:34.27.79

==== Race 1b; Race Post Classic Senior Race ====
Monday 30 August 2010 Mountain Course 4 laps – 150.92 miles (242.80 km)

- Class (i)
- Classic Machines 601 cc-1050 cc Four-stroke motorcycles.
- 351 cc-750 cc Two-stroke motorcycles.

Rank	Rider	Team	Speed	Time
1	(Northern Ireland) Michael Dunlop	997 cc Suzuki XR69	115.938 mph	1:18.06.23
2	(Scotland) Mark Buckley	997 cc Suzuki	112.329 mph	1:20.36.81
3	(England) Geoff Martin	750 cc Suzuki	101.821 mph	1:28.55.97
4	(England) Chris McGahan	746 cc Trident T150	101.376 mph	1:29.19.36
5	(England) Maria Costello	997 cc Suzuki	101.354 mph	1:29.20.54
6	(Isle of Man) David Madsen-Mygdal	750 cc Triumph	98.535 mph	1:31.53.92
7	(England) Frank James	1015 cc Kawasaki	95.892 mph	1:34.25.88
8	(England) Nigel-Sean Rae	750 cc Suzuki	95.222 mph	1:35.05.73
9	(Netherlands) Frank Biggelaar	1000 cc Suzuki	93.294 mph	1:37.03.67
10	(Finland) Jussi Luoma	973 cc Moto Guzzi	92.234 mph	1:38.10.58

Fastest Lap; Michael Dunlop 118.186 mph (19 minutes 09.27 secs) on lap 2

==== Race 1b; Post Classic Junior Race ====
- Class (ii)
- 126 cc-250 cc Two-stroke Cylinder Grand Prix/Standard motorcycles.
- 251 cc-350 cc Two-stroke Cylinder standard motorcycles.
- Up to 600cccc Four-stroke Cylinder motorcycles.

Monday 30 August 2010 – Mountain Course 4 laps – 150.92 miles (242.80 km)

- For motorcycles exceeding 175 cc and not exceeding 250 cc

Rank	Rider	Team	Speed	Time
1	(England) Chris Palmer	250 cc Yamaha	108.991 mph	1:23.04.94
2	(England) Philip McGurk	250 cc Yamaha	104.807 mph	1:26.23.94
3	(Northern Ireland) Barry Davidson	249 cc Yamaha	104.528 mph	1:26.37.78
4	(Scotland) Ewan Hamilton	249 cc Yamaha	102.273 mph	1:28.32.38
5	(England) Peter Symes	250 cc Honda	100.095 mph	1:30.27.97
6	(Scotland) Derek Glass	350 cc Yamaha	97.317 mph	1:33.02.94
7	(England) Steve Fletcher	249 cc Yamaha	94.198 mph	1:36.07.78
8	(England) Tony Russell	250 cc Yamaha	93.637 mph	1:36.42.34
9	(England) Bob Farrington	250 cc Kawasaki	90.684 mph	1:39.51.27

Fastest Lap; Chris Palmer 111.729 mph (20 minutes 15.69 secs) on lap 1

==== Race 2a; Junior Classic Race ====
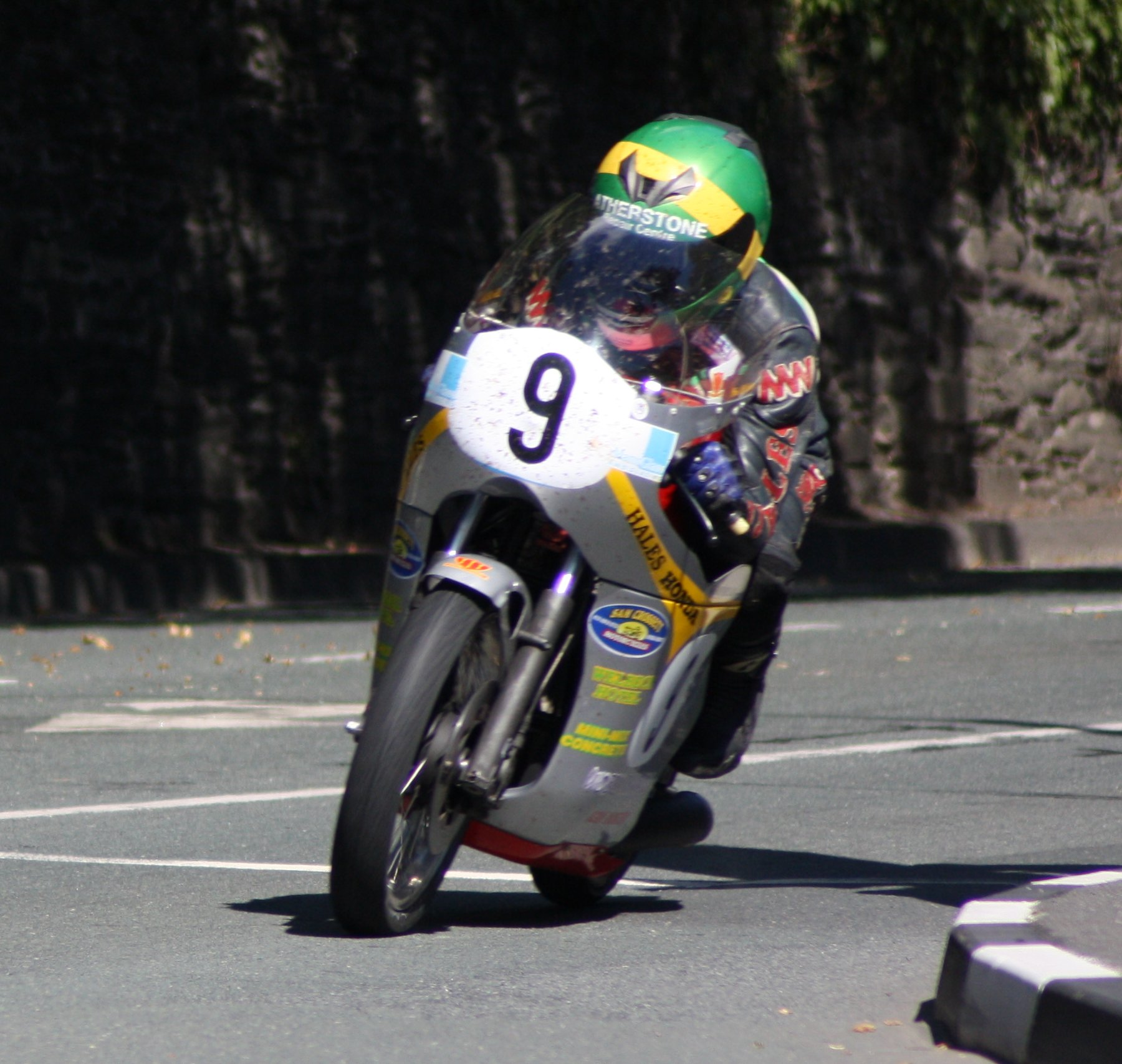
Chris McGahan finished as runner-up in the Junior Classic on a Honda

Monday 30 August 2010 Mountain Course 4 laps – 150.92 miles (242.80 km)

- For motorcycles exceeding 300 cc and not exceeding 351 cc

Rank	Rider	Team	Speed	Time
1	(England) Roy Richardson	349 cc Aermacchi	101.933 mph	1:28.50.08
2	(England) Chris McGahan	346 cc Honda	100.800 mph	1:29.49.99
3	(England) Alan Oversby	348 cc MV Agusta	98.626 mph	1:31.48.79
4	(England) Doug Snow	340 cc Ducati	98.595 mph	1:31.50.54
5	(England) Mark Herbertson	350 cc AJS	97.358 mph	1:33.00.58
6	(England) Keith Dixon	349 cc Honda	93.556 mph	1:36.47.36
7	(England) Alec Whitwell	350 cc Honda	92.929 mph	1:37.26.54
8	(Republic of Ireland) Sean Leonard	346 cc Honda	92.903 mph	1:37.28.15
9	(Wales) Meredydd Owen	348 cc Seeley Mk II	91.934 mph	1:38.29.80
10	(Northern Ireland) Nigel Moore	348 cc Honda	91.628 mph	1:38.49.55

Fastest Lap; Roy Richardson 102.948 mph (21 minutes 59.38 secs)

==== Race 2b; Lightweight Classic Race ====
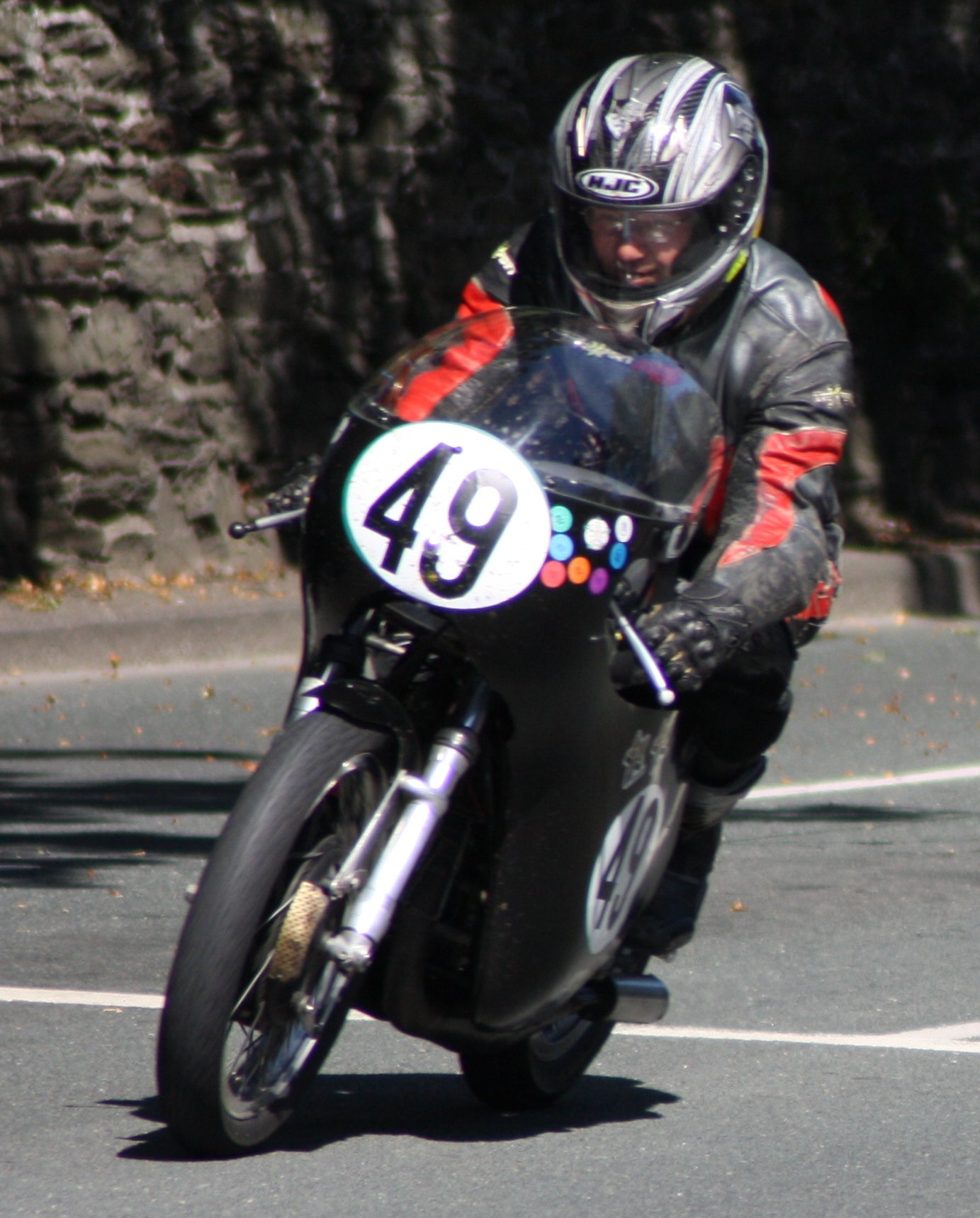
David Smith finished as runner-up in the Lightweight Classic on a Yamaha

Monday 30 August 2010 – Mountain Course 4 laps – 150.92 miles (242.80 km)

- For motorcycles exceeding 175 cc and not exceeding 250 cc

Rank	Rider	Team	Speed	Time
1	(England) Peter Wakefield	247 cc Suzuki	91.339 mph	1:39.08.32
2	(England) David Smith	246 cc Yamaha	89.935 mph	1:40.41.17
3	(England) Jeff Ward	247 cc Suzuki	88.813 mph	1:41.57.48
4	(England) Paul Johnson	247 cc Suzuki	88.415 mph	1:42.25.05
5	(Isle of Man) Bob Simmons	247 cc Suzuki	88.305 mph	1:42.32.69
6	(England) Geoff Bates	349 cc Honda	84.697 mph	1:46.54.79
7	(England) Andy Wilson	247 cc Suzuki	92.929 mph	1:47.12.72
8	(England) Tony Mason	249 cc Honda	80.599 mph	1:52.20.94

Fastest Lap; Ewan Hamilton 94.273 mph (24 minutes 00.80 secs)

==== Race 3; Junior Manx Grand Prix ====
Wednesday 1 September 2010 Mountain Course 1 lap – 37.733 miles (60.73 km) Reduced Race Distance (Revised Result).

- 201 cc-250 cc Two-stroke Two-cylinder motorcycles
- 550 cc-600 cc Four-stroke Four-cylinder motorcycles.
- 601 cc-675 cc Four-stroke Three-cylinder motorcycles.
- 651 cc-750 cc Four-stroke Two-cylinder motorcycles.

Rank	Rider	Team	Speed	Time
1	(Republic of Ireland) Michael Sweeney	600 cc Yamaha	118.812 mph	19' 03.22
2	(Republic of Ireland) Wayne Kirwan	600 cc Yamaha	118.692 mph	19' 04.37
3	(Isle of Man) Simon Fulton	600 cc Yamaha	118.474 mph	19' 06.48
4	(England) Jules Croft	600 cc Yamaha	118.240 mph	19' 08.75
5	(England) Andrew Brady	599 cc Honda	117.199 mph	19' 18.95
6	(England) Ivan Lintin	600 cc Suzuki	117.045 mph	19' 20.48
7	(England) Philip McGurk	600 cc Honda	116.670 mph	19' 24.21
8	(Republic of Ireland) David Lumsden	600 cc Yamaha	115.565 mph	19' 35.34
9	(Isle of Man) Paul Smyth	600 cc Yamaha	113.891 mph	19' 52.62
10	(Northern Ireland) Stephen McKnight	599 cc Yamaha	113.766 mph	19' 53.93

Fastest Lap; Simon Fulton 119.516 mph (18 minutes 56.48 secs) on lap 1 (10 second penalty added to race time)

==== Race 4; Senior Classic Race ====
Thursday 2 September 2010 Mountain Course 4 laps – 150.92 miles (242.80 km)

- For motorcycles exceeding 351 cc and not exceeding 500 cc

Rank	Rider	Team	Speed	Time
1	(England) Roy Richardson	476 cc Aermacchi	105.764 mph	1:25.37.01
2	(England) Paul Coward	492 cc Nourish Weslake	99.170 mph	1:31.18.62
3	(England) Dave Matravers	500 cc Matchless	94.340 mph	1:35.59.07
4	(England) Mick Moreton	499 cc Paton	94.122 mph	1:36.12.41
5	(England) Bob Millinship	476 cc Ducati Seeley	93.934 mph	1:36.23.95
6	(England) Henry Bell	498 cc Honda	93.608 mph	1:36.44.13
7	(Isle of Man) Edward Poole	499 cc Norton	92.224 mph	1:38.11.24
8	(England) Ian Bainbridge	499 cc Norton	91.388 mph	1:39.05.13
9	(England) Tom Jackson	498 cc Honda	91.287 mph	1:39.11.70
10	(England) Richard Stott	496 cc Matchless	91.225 mph	1:39.15.75

Fastest Lap: Alan Oversby – 109.089 mph (20 minutes 45.11 secs)

==== Race 4b; Formula Classic Race ====
Thursday 2 September 2010 Mountain Course 4 laps – 150.92 miles (242.80 km)

- For motorcycles exceeding 501 cc and not exceeding 750 cc

Rank	Rider	Team	Speed	Time
1	(England) Chris McGahan	746 cc Trident	102.563 mph	1:28.17.33
2	(Isle of Man) David Madsen-Mygdal	750 cc Triumph	101.260 mph	1:29.25.51
3	(England) Alex Whitwell	560 cc Honda	94.471 mph	1:35.51.09

Fastest Lap; Chris McGahan 104.863 mph (21 minutes 35.29 secs)

==== Race 5a; Lightweight Manx Grand Prix ====
Friday 3 September 2010 Mountain Course 4 laps – 150.92 miles (242.80 km)

- Two-stroke motorcycles 201 cc – 350 cc

Rank	Rider	Team	Speed	Time
1	(England) Neil Kent	250 cc Yamaha	109.374 mph	1:22.47.49
2	(England) Tom Snow	250 cc Honda	107.309 mph	1:24.23.08
3	(England) Stuart Garton	250 cc Yamaha	106.498 mph	1:25.01.63
4	(Isle of Man) Dean Martin	250 cc Honda	103.544 mph	1:27.27.15
5	(Isle of Man) Carl Roberts	250 cc Yamaha	102.079 mph	1:28.42.45
6	(Scotland) Derek Glass	250 cc Yamaha	97.895 mph	1:32.29.95
7	(England) Steve Fletcher	250 cc Yamaha	97.875 mph	1:32.31.09

Fastest Lap; Neil Kent 112.078 mph (20 minutes 11.91 seconds) on lap 2

==== Race 5b; Ultra-Lightweight Manx Grand Prix ====
Friday 3 September 2010 Mountain Course 4 laps – 150.92 miles (242.80 km)

- Two-stroke motorcycles up to 125 cc, 6 gears maximum.
- Four-stroke motorcycles 251 cc – 401 cc
- Up to 650 cc Four-stroke twin-cylinder.

Rank	Rider	Team	Speed	Time
1	(England) Philip McGurk	650 cc Kawasaki	110.709 mph	1:21.47.58
2	(Scotland) Rab Davie	650 cc Honda	109.144 mph	1:22.57.92
3	(Northern Ireland) Joe Phillips	650 cc Kawasaki	108.958 mph	1:23.06.45
4	(England) David Bell	650 cc Kawasaki	108.697 mph	1:23.18.42
5	(England) Ivan Lintin	650c Suzuki	108.273 mph	1:22.37.97
6	(Isle of Man) Jonny Heginbotham	650 cc Kawasaki	107.129 mph	1:24.31.58
7	(Republic of Ireland) Wayne Kirwan	650 cc Suzuki	106.799 mph	1:24.47.23
8	(England) Mike Minns	650 cc Kawasaki	106.762 mph	1:24.49.00
9	(Isle of Man) Lee Darbyshire	650 cc Kawasaki	105.241 mph	1:26.02.54
10	(Republic of Ireland) Adrian Farrell	650 cc Kawasaki	104.583 mph	1:26.35.02

Fastest Lap; Phillip McGurk 112.572 mph (20 minutes 06.58 seconds) on lap 4

==== Race 6; Senior Manx Grand Prix ====
Friday 3 September 2010 Mountain Course 4 laps – 150.92 miles (242.80 km)

- Four-stroke Four-cylinder motorcycles exceeding 550 cc and not exceeding 750 cc.
- Four-stroke Twin-cylinder motorcycles exceeding 651 cc and not exceeding 1000 cc.
- Four-stroke Three-cylinder motorcycles exceeding 601 cc and not exceeding 675 cc.

Rank	Rider	Team	Speed	Time
1	(Isle of Man) Simon Fulton	599 cc Yamaha	118.288 mph	1:16.33.11
2	(Republic of Ireland) Wayne Kirwan	600 cc Yamaha	118.016 mph	1:16.43.70
3	(England) Ivan Lintin	750 cc Suzuki	116.201 mph	1:17.55.62
4	(England) Jules Croft	600 cc Yamaha	115.784 mph	1:18.12.47
5	(Northern Ireland) Shaun Anderson	750 cc Suzuki	114.607 mph	1:19.00.66
6	(Isle of Man) Dan Sayle	599 cc Yamaha	113.929 mph	1:19.28.87
7	(Northern Ireland) Stephen McKnight	599 cc Yamaha	113.657 mph	1:19.40.28
8	(Norway) Sebastian Buch	600 cc Yamaha	113.405 mph	1:19:50.89
9	(England) Grant Wagstaff	599 cc Yamaha	112.456 mph	1:20.31.31
10	(Republic of Ireland) Andrew Farrell	750 cc Yamaha	112.401 mph	1:20.33.71

Fastest Lap; Simon Fulton 120.119 mph (18 minutes 50.78 secs) on lap 1.

== Gallery ==
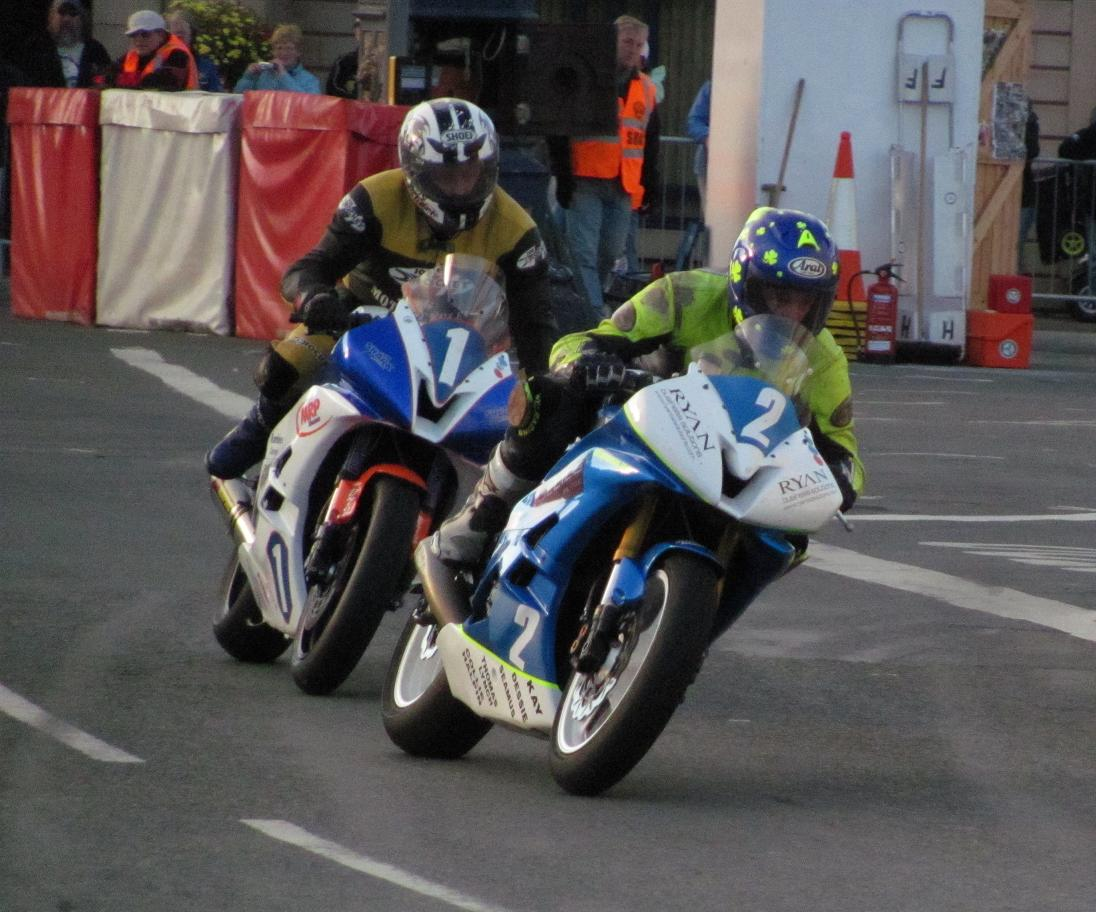
David Lumsden (2) & Wayne Kirwan (1) Junior MGP class at Parliament Square, Ramsey on the third Manx Grand Prix practice session – Tuesday 24 August 2010.

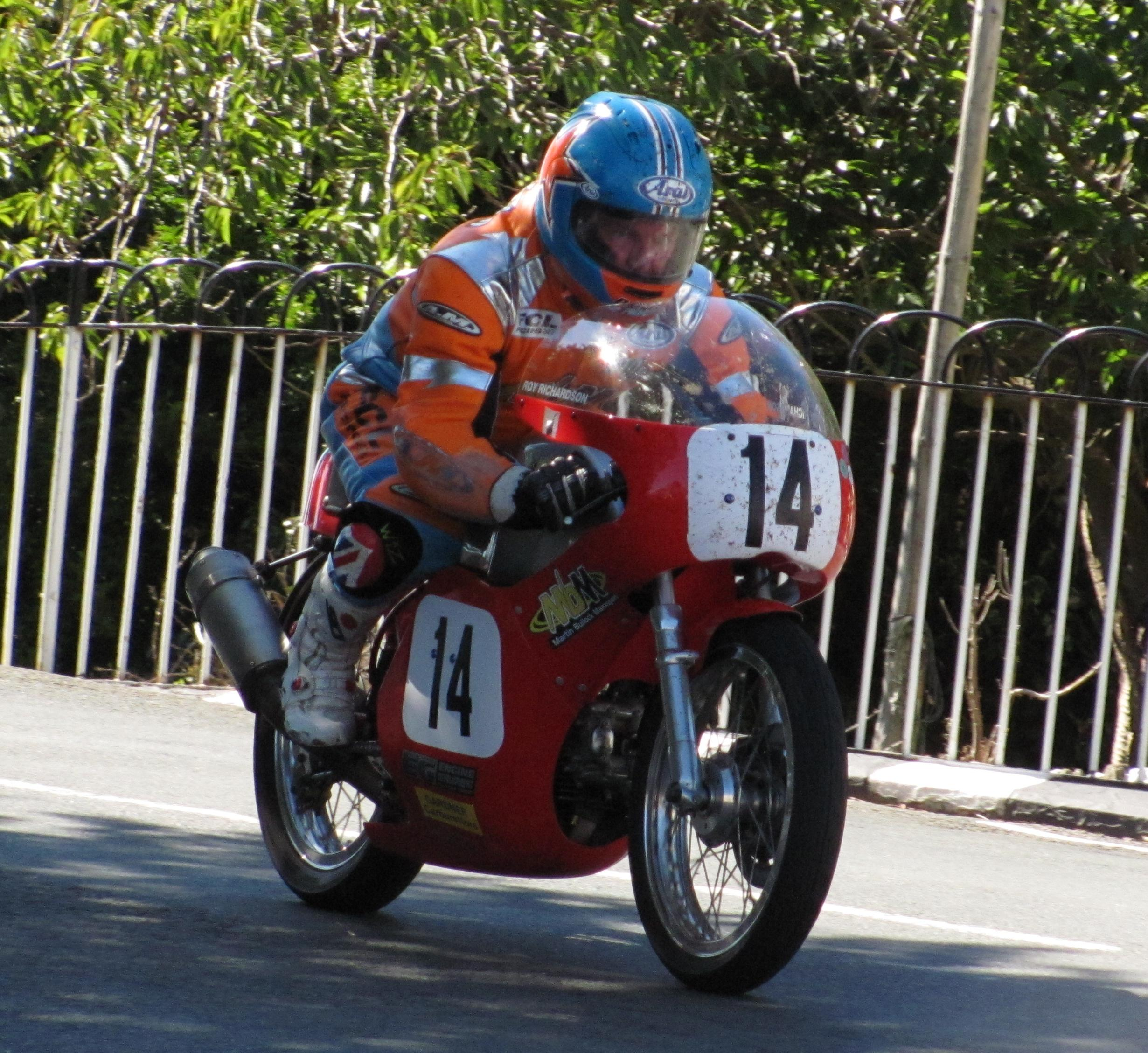
Roy Richardson 349 cc Aermacchi, Ballaugh Bridge the winner of Junior Classic Manx Grand Prix – Monday 30 August 2010.

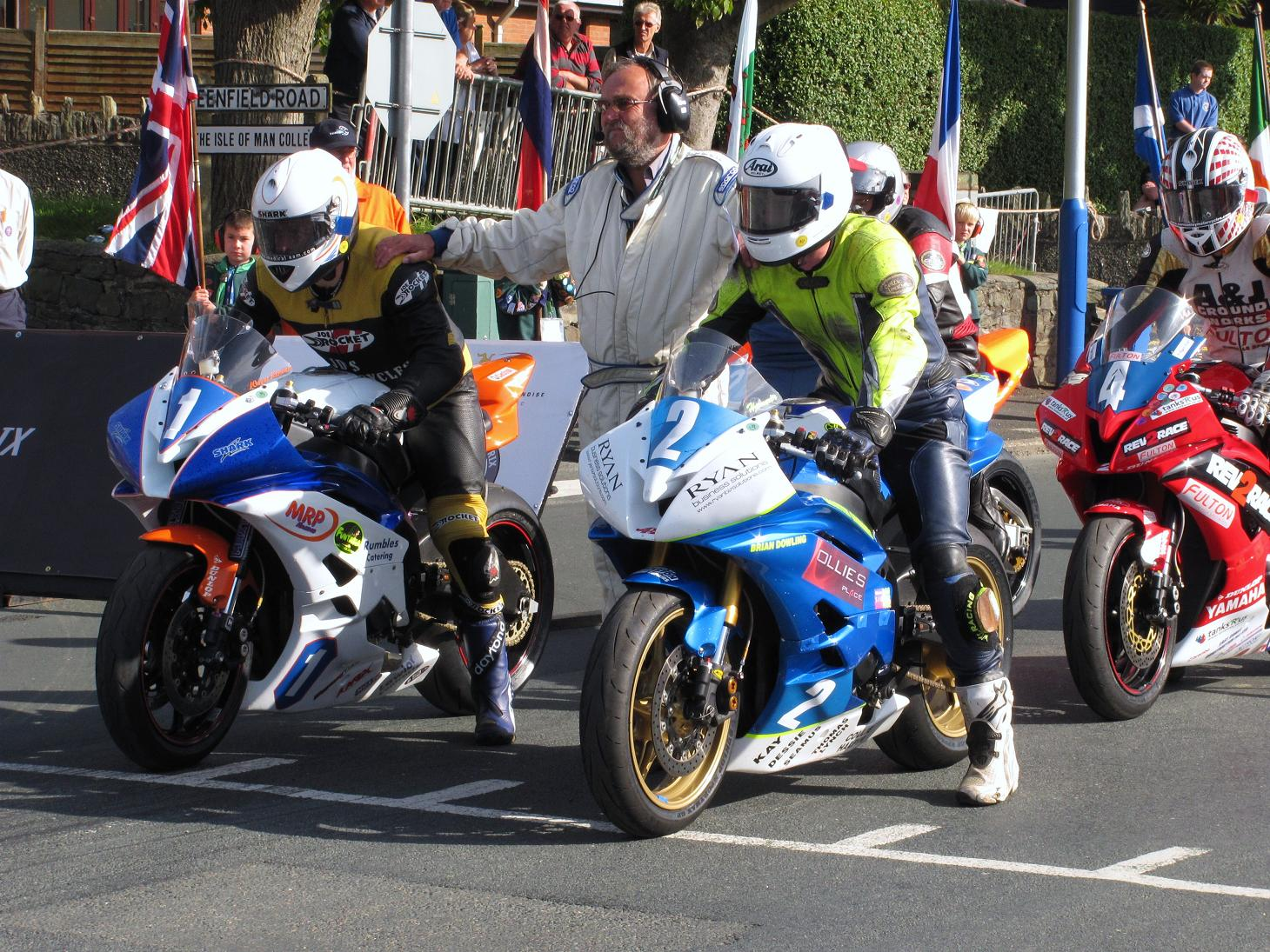
Wayne Kirwan (1), David Lumsden (2) & Simon Fulton (4) start-line TT Grandstand Junior Manx Grand Prix – Wednesday 1 September 2010.
