= Dassault LOGIDUC =

The Dassault LOGIDUC – sometimes spelled Logiduc in French and LogiDuc in English – (Logique de Développement d'UCAV, French for "Unmanned Combat Aerial Vehicle development solution") was an autonomous industrial program launched in 1999 by the French aircraft manufacturer Dassault Aviation in view to develop its UAV design capacities. This French programme eventually led to the creation of the Dassault-Sagem Tactical UAV company and to the European "combat drone" project nEUROn.

The LOGIDUC program consisted of a series of three stealth aerial vehicles, from scale 1/100 to 1/1, in view to collect data required by the production of a fighter-sized stealth UCAV type supporting the Dassault Rafale in the 2010s and to design autonomous stealth fighters primary used by the French Air Force circa 2025.

The two first vehicles, AVE-D and AVE-C, are scale model 1/100 (50kg) and 1/10 (500kg) stealth "tactical drones" (UAV), while the final version was to be a full-scale (5,000kg) prototype stealth "combat drone" (UCAV).

Each vehicle was given an owl name as "Duc" ("duke") is the French name of a nocturnal bird of prey species known in Latin as Otus aka Scops owl. Petit Duc ("small duke") stands for scops owl, Moyen Duc ("medium duke") stands for long-eared owl and Grand Duc ("large duke") is eagle owl. Other Dassault aircraft with bird names are the Dassault MD 315 Flamant (flamingo), the Dassault Falcon (falcon) family and the Dassault Hirondelle (swallow).

LOGIDUC was a 3-step program with the following aims:

- Petit Duc:

Mastering stealth aircraft design.
Confronting stealth aircraft to modern air-to-air combat systems.
Confronting stealth aircraft to modern ground-to-air combat systems.

- Moyen Duc:

Experimenting unstable yaw aircraft control methods.

- Grand Duc:

Acquiring full mission system representativity.
Acquiring composite pack airborne control.
Acquiring collaborative flight with drones and aircraft.
Acquiring live air-to-ground weapon release.

The Petit Duc and Moyen Duc both reached the flying stage; the Grand Duc was cancelled in 2003 and replaced by the nEUROn European project.

== See also ==
- Dassault nEUROn
- Dassault-Sagem SlowFast

== Media links ==
- video: AVE-D Petit Duc test flight, 2000 (Aviation Design/Dassault Aviation)
- video: AVE-C Moyen Duc flight (also AVE-D Petit Duc escorting a Rafale), January 2004 (Pascal Fellous/Dassault Aviation)
- video: AVE-C, AVE-D & nEUROn design and flight, Dassault Activities (Dassault Aviation)
- video: nEUROn (AVE Grand Duc vers.) promotional featurette, June 11, 2005 (Dassault Aviation)
