= Alenia Aermacchi =

Italian company active in the aeronautics sector

Alenia Aermacchi S.p.A.
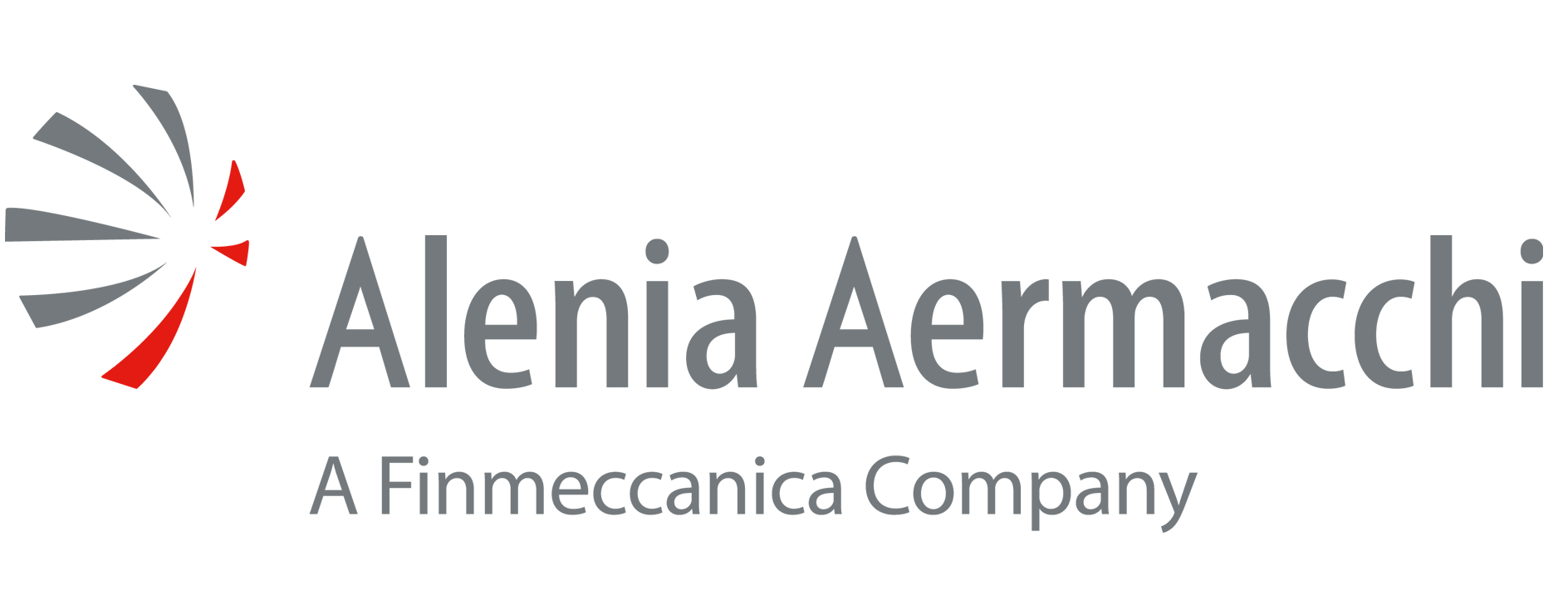
- Type: S.A. (corporation)
- Industry: Aeronautics
- Predecessor: Alenia Aeronautica; Aermacchi
- Founded: January 2012
- Defunct: 31 December 2015 (aged 3) (merged into Leonardo-Finmeccanica)
- Successor: Leonardo S.p.A.
- Headquarters: Venegono Superiore, Varese, Italy
- Number of locations: Pomigliano, Turin, Venice, Varese, Grottaglie, Nola, Foggia
- Products: Aircraft
- Services: Aero structures Overhaul and Modifications (Alenia Aeronavali)
- Revenue: ▲€ 3,118 million € (2015)
- Net income: ▲€250 million
- Number of employees: 10,483 (2015)
- Parent: Finmeccanica (until 31 December 2015
- Divisions: Alenia Composite; Quadrics
- Subsidiaries: Alenia Aermacchi North America
- Website: https://aircraft.leonardo.com/en/home

Alenia Aermacchi was a company active in the aeronautics sector, with offices and plants in Venegono Superiore, Varese, Turin Airport in San Maurizio Canavese, Province of Turin and Pomigliano d'Arco, Province of Naples. From 1 January 2016, the activities of Alenia Aermacchi merged into Leonardo's Aircraft and Aerostructures Division.

== History ==
Alenia Aermacchi was created on 1 January 2012 as the merger of Alenia Aeronautica and its subsidiaries (Alenia) Aermacchi and Alenia SIA. The former Alenia Aeronautica was created in 1990 by concentrating the Finmeccanica aerospace and defense industries Aeritalia and Selenia.

== Products ==
- Alenia C-27J Spartan
- Alenia Aermacchi M-345
- Alenia Aermacchi M-346 Master
- Alenia Aeronautica Sky-X
- Alenia Aeronautica Sky-Y

=== Joint ventures ===
- ATR 42 with Airbus
- ATR 72 with Airbus
- F-35 Lightning II with Lockheed Martin Aeronautics
- Eurofighter with Airbus Defence and Space and BAE Systems
- Panavia Tornado with EADS and BAE Systems
- Sukhoi Superjet 100 with Sukhoi
- Boeing 787

== See also ==
- Selex ES
- Thales Alenia Space, ex-Alenia Spazio and ex-Alcatel Alenia Space
