= Alenia Aeronautica ITV =

ITV

General information
- Type: Technology demonstrator
- Manufacturer: Alenia

The Alenia ITV is a technology demonstrator aircraft developed in Italy in the early 21st century. In the spring of 2003, Alenia Aeronautica of Italy unveiled a non-flying ground-test prototype of a half-scale unmanned combat aerial vehicle demonstrator, known as an "Integration Technology Vehicle (ITV)", with a flight prototype to follow. The ITV has a high-mounted wing with a sweep of 35 degrees; a vee tail; a Microturbo TRI60-5 turbojet, with 4.4 kN (450 kgp / 990 lbf) thrust, mounted on the back behind the wing; retractable tricycle landing gear; and metal construction.

As the ITV designation suggests, this machine is strictly for technology development and risk reduction. A "real" Alenia Aeronautica UCAV will be at least twice as big, use a tailless delta configuration, and will be made mostly of composite materials. It will have a modular payload bay for carriage of smart weapons, SAR, or day-night EO sensors. Alenia Spazio, a sister organization in the Finnmeccia Group, will provide a satellite data link. Meteor is also part of the Finnmeccia group and there is likely some collaboration between Meteor and Alenia Aeronautica on UAV design.

== Specifications ==
General characteristics

- Crew: None
- Capacity: 300 kg (660 lb) payload
- Length: 6.00 m (19 ft 8 in)
- Wingspan: 5.74 m (18 ft 10 in)
- Empty weight: 550 kg (1,210 lb)
- Gross weight: 1,000 kg (2,200 lb)
- Powerplant: 1 × Microturbo TRI60-5 , 4.4 kN (990 lbf) thrust

Performance

- Range: 185 km (115 mi, 100 nmi)
- Service ceiling: 10,000 m (32,800 ft)
