= Alenia Aeronautica =

Italian aerospace company (1990–2012)

Alenia Aeronautica S.p.A.
- Type: Private Subsidiary
- Industry: Aerospace and defence
- Predecessor: Aeritalia; Selenia
- Founded: 1990
- Defunct: January 2012
- Fate: Merged
- Successor: Alenia Aermacchi
- Headquarters: Rome, Italy
- Number of locations: Pomigliano, Turin, Venice, Varese, Grottaglie, Casoria, Nola, Foggia
- Products: Combat and Defense Aircraft; Trainer Aircraft (Alenia Aermacchi); Military Air Lifters; Patrol Aircraft; Regional Turboprop (ATR); Regional Turbofan (Superjet-100)
- Services: Aero structures Overhaul and Modifications (Alenia Aeronavali)
- Revenue: ▲€ 2.53 billion (FY2008)
- Net income: ▲€250 million
- Owner: Leonardo S.p.A.
- Number of employees: 13,910
- Parent: Leonardo S.p.A.
- Divisions: Alenia Aermacchi; Alenia Aeronavali; Alenia Composite; Alenia SIA; Quadrics
- Subsidiaries: Alenia North America; ATR; Superjet 100

Alenia Aeronautica was an Italian aerospace company. Its subsidiaries included Alenia Aermacchi and Alenia Aeronavali.

Alenia Aeronautica was also the part-owner of ATR, a joint venture with European Aeronautic Defence and Space Company (EADS).

During January 2012, the company was reorganized as Alenia Aermacchi. Three years later, it was fully merged into Finmeccanica, which has since reorganised itself as a more integrated business, adopting the Leonardo name for the group.

== History ==
Alenia Aeronautica was created during 1990 by merger of IRI's Aeritalia and Selenia subsidiaries.

The new company was associated with several ongoing aircraft programmes and partnerships, including the multinational Eurofighter Typhoon fighter programme, the Panavia Tornado fighter-bomber. As a partner in Panavia Aircraft GmbH, Aeritalia manufactured the Tornado's wings while the other partners (British Aerospace and MBB/DASA) manufactured the rest of the airframe. It also held a 20 per cent stake in Turbo-Union, a separate company formed to develop and build the RB199 engines for the aircraft. Production of the Tornado ended in 1998; the final batch of aircraft being produced was delivered to the Royal Saudi Air Force.

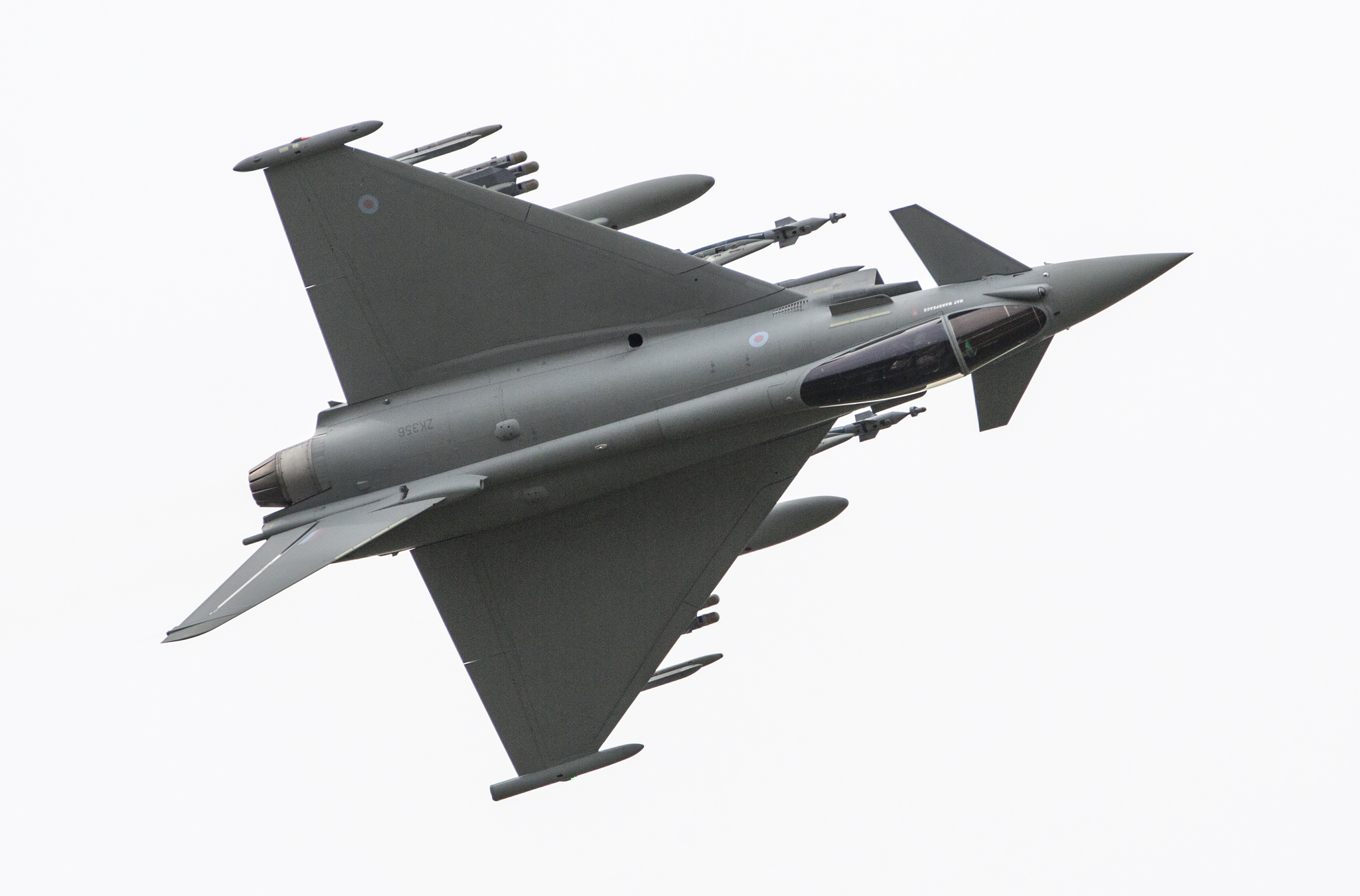
RAF Typhoon FGR4 ZK356 shows off its delta wing, July 2016

Alenia had 19.5% a workshare stake in the Eurofighter Typhoon programme. On 27 March 1994, the maiden flight of the Eurofighter prototype took place in Bavaria. In September 1998, contracts were signed for production of 148 Tranche 1 aircraft and procurement of long lead-time items for Tranche 2 aircraft.

=== Yak-130 development ===
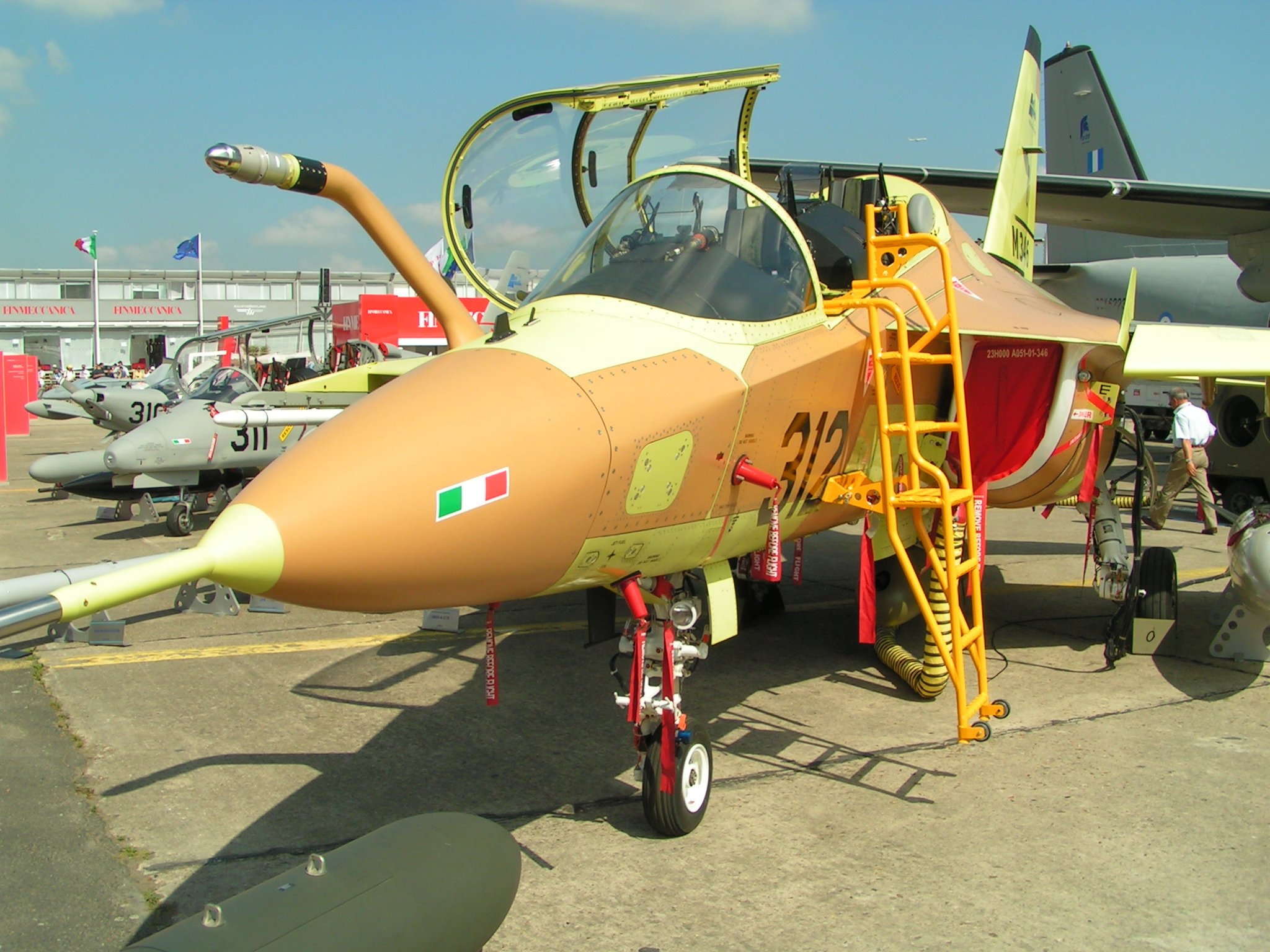
M-346 prototype 002 at Le Bourget airshow, 2005

During 1992, Aermacchi signed a cooperation agreement with Russian aircraft company Yakovlev to support a new trainer that the firm was developing for the Russian Air Force. Aermacchi secured the right to modify and market the aircraft for the Western market. The resulting aircraft first flew in 1996 and by this point, the aircraft was being marketed as the Yak/AEM-130.

In October 1998, it was reported that the venture was increasingly becoming an Italian-led effort due to a lack of Russian financial support.

In mid-2000, it was announced that differences between the two firms and a lack of backing from the Russian participants had ended the partnership. Instead, each company would pursue independent development. Yakovlev received a final payment of US$77 million for technical documents. Yakovlev would be able to sell the Yak-130 to countries such as those in the Commonwealth of Independent States, India, Slovakia and Algeria, while Aermacchi had the right to sell the M-346 to NATO nations and others. The M-346 is a highly modified version of the aircraft that developed under the joint venture, using equipment exclusively from Western manufacturers. The first M-346 prototype rolled out on 7 June 2003, and conducted its maiden flight on 15 July 2004.

In January 2005, the Greek Ministry of Defense signed a Memorandum of Understanding (MOU) to become a partner in the programme and an industrial cooperation agreement between Alenia and the Hellenic Aerospace Industry was signed the following year.

In March 2008, the Chilean ENAER signed an MOU with Alenia at the FIDAE air show. During May 2008, Boeing signed an MOU to cooperate on the marketing, sales, training and support of two Aermacchi trainers, the M-346 and the M-311. On 18 December 2008, Aermacchi announced that the M-346 had attained a maximum speed of Mach 1.15 (1,255 km/h, 678 knots, 780 mph), claiming the occasion to be the first in which an all-Italian built aircraft had broken the sound barrier in 50 years.

On 20 June 2011, a Military Type Certification was granted to Alenia Aermacchi for the M-346 Master by the General Directorate for Aeronautical Armaments of the Italian Ministry of Defence in Rome.

=== C-27J ===
In 1995, Alenia and Lockheed Martin began discussions to improve Alenia's G.222 utility transport aircraft using C-130J's glass cockpit and a more powerful version of the G.222's T64G engine and four-blade propellers. This became the C-27J and in 1997, Alenia and Lockheed Martin formed Lockheed Martin Alenia Tactical Transport Systems (LMATTS) to develop the C-27J. The design changed to use the C-130J's AE 2100 engine and six-blade propeller. Other changes include a fully digital MIL-STD-1553 systems and avionics architecture, and an updated cargo compartment for increased commonality. The C-27J has a 35% increase in range and a 15% faster cruise speed than the G.222. Alenia Aeronautica paired with American defense specialist L-3 Communications to form the Global Military Aircraft Systems (GMAS) joint venture to market the C-27J; Boeing also joined GMAS. During 2007, it was announced that the C-27J had been selected by the US Defense Department for its Joint Cargo Aircraft programme; the C-27J team was awarded an initial contract worth US$2.04 billion for 78 C-27Js in June 2007.

=== Transition to Leonardo ===
During 2002, Alenia Aeronautica was incorporated when Finmeccanica restructured itself, spinning off its various divisions as independent companies. Finmeccanica has since reorganised itself into a more closely integrated business, adopting the Leonardo name for the group.

== Products ==
=== Aircraft ===
- Alenia C-27J Spartan
- ATR 42
- ATR 72
- Alenia Aermacchi M-346 Master

=== Unmanned aerial vehicles ===
- Alenia Aeronautica ITV
- Alenia Aermacchi Sky-X
- Alenia Aermacchi Sky-Y

=== Collaborations ===
- Eurofighter with EADS and BAE Systems
- AMX International with Embraer
- Panavia Tornado via Panavia Aircraft GmbH
- nEUROn Unmanned Combat Aerial Vehicle with Dassault Aviation (among others)
- Boeing 787 via Global Aeronautica, LLC with Boeing

=== Missiles ===
- Aspide

== See also ==
- Alenia Marconi Systems
- Thales Alenia Space, ex-Alenia Spazio and ex-Alcatel Alenia Space
