= Alenia Aermacchi Sky-Y =

Sky-Y
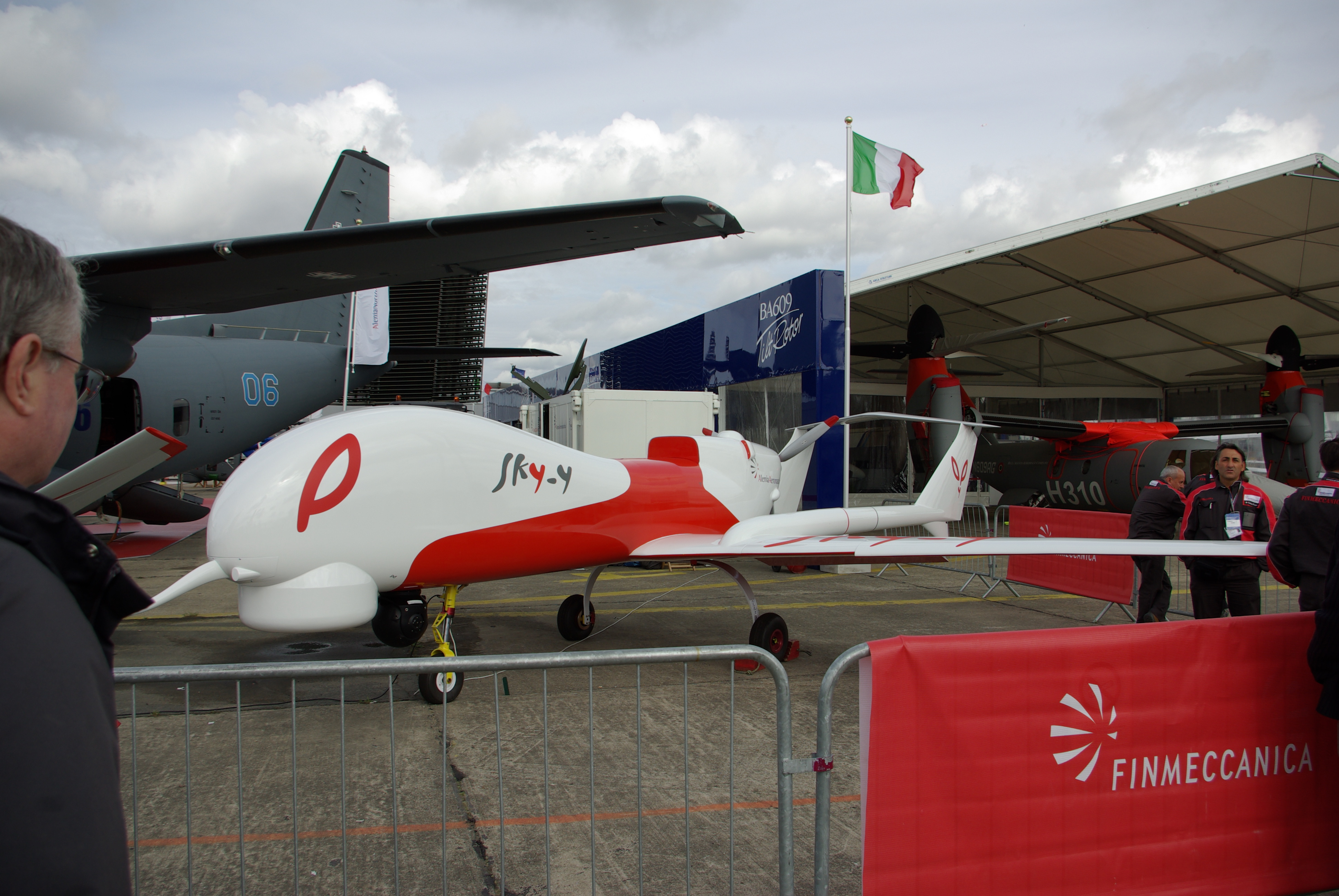
- Sky-Y at Paris Air Show 2007

General information
- Type: Unmanned Aerial Vehicle
- Manufacturer: Leonardo of Italy; Alenia Aeronautica of Italy
- Primary user: Research prototype
- Number built: 1

History
- First flight: 10 June 2007

The Italian Alenia Aeronautica Sky-Y is a self-financed MALE Unmanned air vehicle for demonstration and research purpose; on 30 October 2007 it set a new European endurance record in the over 1000 kg category with a spotless eight-hour flight. Since 2016 manufacturer became Leonardo-Finmeccanica as Alenia Aermaccchi merged into the new Finmeccanica (definitively rebranded Leonardo since 2017).

== Design and development ==
The roll-out of the Sky-Y was carried out by Alenia in June 2007, after 12 months of development, and it first flew at the Swedish test area of Vidsel.

As a testbed for key MALE UAV technologies the aircraft include a heavy fuel engine of automotive derivation, a new night and day ATOL system (Autonomous take off and landing), a collision avoidance system and an advanced data link with surveillance sensor data integration. After a first test campaign conducted in order to explore the whole flight envelope and the engine performance the development has focused on data treatment, elaboration and fusion with the onboard Galileo Avionica EOS-45 IR cam, the Selex Galileo SAR radar and the satellite datalink.

The company is now looking towards the developing of a new bigger dual use MALE UAV derived from the Sky-Y experience, the Molynx.

== Specifications (Sky-Y) ==
General characteristics

- Crew: none
- Length: 31 ft 10 in (9.72 m)
- Wingspan: 32 ft 7 in (9.94 m)
- Height: 6 ft 1 in (1.86 m)
- Empty weight: 1,873 lb (850 kg)
- Gross weight: 2,314 lb (1,050 kg)
- Max takeoff weight: 2,645 lb (1,200 kg)
- Powerplant: 1 × DieselJet FIAT 1.9 JTD common rail FADEC turbodiesel four-cylinder engine, 170 hp (126 kW)

Performance

- Cruise speed: 160 mph (260 km/h, 140 kn)
- Endurance: 14 hours
- Service ceiling: 25,000 ft (7,600 m) at least

Armament

- None (ISR)
