= Dassault-Sagem SlowFast =

SlowFast

General information
- Type: Reconnaissance UAV
- National origin: France
- Manufacturer: Dassault-Sagem

History
- Developed from: Dassault AVE-C Moyen Duc

The Dassault-Sagem SlowFast is a tactical stealth UAV concept designed by the French unmanned aircraft manufacturer Dassault-Sagem Tactical UAV in 2004. The program was cancelled.

The SlowFast is an evolution of the twin-engine tactical UAV Dassault AVE-C Moyen Duc. The SlowFast designation comes from its versatility to perform high-speed reconnaissance flight (Mach 1.6) and 3–4 hours autonomy low-speed (120 kt) observation mission. Its ground station is based on the Sagem Sperwer's model. The drone was designed for the French Army's needs and was planned to be used by the Ground Force divisions.

== Specifications (as designed) ==
General characteristics

- Crew: None
- Gross weight: 500 kg (1,100 lb)

Performance

- Maximum speed: Mach 1.6
- Endurance: 3-4 hours

== See also ==
- Dassault AVE-C Moyen Duc
