= Dassault AVE-C Moyen Duc =

AVE-C Moyen Duc

General information
- Type: UCAV development aircraft
- National origin: France
- Manufacturer: Dassault

History
- First flight: ca. September 2004
- Developed into: Dassault-Sagem SlowFast

The Dassault AVE-C Moyen Duc was a sub-scale experimental stealth UAV built in France in 2004 as a step in the development of a UCAV under Dassault Aviation's LOGIDUC programme. AVE-C stands for Aéronef de Validation Expérimentale - Contrôle ("Experimental Assessment Aircraft - Control"), and Moyen Duc is the French name for the long-eared owl, but also a wordplay on the LOGIDUC programme name, with moyen meaning "middle". As the AVE-D was designed by Dassault according to a rapid prototyping to cost methodology, the AVE-C was developed and completed within a year and the first prototype was produced in July 2001.

The AVE-C is a stealth tactical UAV prototype developed according to the French Army's post-SDTI needs in reconnaissance. In 2002, Dassault planned to create an industrial partnership with French electronic company Sagem. The company was founded the following year as Dassault-Sagem Tactical UAV with the purpose to mass-produce the Moyen Duc. The 2004 tactical UAV Dassault-Sagem SlowFast is based on the Moyen Duc, with the Sagem Sperwer's ground control station, and will be used by the French Army.

== Specifications ==
General characteristics

- Crew: None
- Gross weight: 500 kg (1,100 lb)

Performance

- Endurance: 4 hours
