= Dassault AVE-D Petit Duc =

French experimental stealth UAV

AVE-D Petit Duc

General information
- Type: UAV development aircraft
- National origin: France
- Manufacturer: Dassault

History
- First flight: 18 July 2000

The Dassault AVE-D Petit Duc was a sub-scale experimental stealth UAV built in France in 2000 as the first step in the development of a UCAV under Dassault Aviation's LOGIDUC programme. AVE-D stands for Aéoronef de Validation Expérimentale - Discrétion ("Experimental Assessment Aircraft - Stealth"), and petit duc is the French name for the Eurasian scops-owl, but also a wordplay on the LOGIDUC programme name, with petit meaning "small". The early prototypes were manufactured by French subcontractor Aviation Design while the other units were all built by Dassault itself.

The AVE was developed from 1999 to 2000 by a Dassault Aviation-Aviation Design joint team. Manufacturing of the first prototype took eight months and was proceeded in Aviation Design's factory at Milly-la-Forêt, France. Aviation Design is a French design and manufacturing specialist of civil and military devices including high-quality RC jet-powered aircraft, UAVs, evolved aerial targets used by the French Army for training, as well as GPS ground stations for UAVs/aerial targets. The company is led by Rantet & son, father, Jacques, is pilot veteran and son, Éric, is an aeronautics engineer.

In order to reduce the radar and infrared signatures, the vehicle was fully molded in carbon fiber and other undisclosed "special material" reducing the Petit Duc's radar cross section to the signature of a sparrow. The AVE's flight track is followed by the ground station's GPS, as well as parameters such as speed, altitude, turbines or fuel. As an autonomous aircraft, the Petit Duc is fitted with an automatic pilot consisting of a computer system and gyroscope for stabilization and guidance. Its retractable landing gear allows the French UAV to take-off and land -using a backup parachute- from a regular airstrip. On July 18, 2000, the Dassault A.V.E became the first stealth unmanned aircraft to fly in Europe.

== Specifications ==
Data from

General characteristics

- Crew: None
- Length: 2.40 m (7 ft 11 in)
- Wingspan: 2.40 m (7 ft 11 in)
- Empty weight: 35 kg (77 lb)
- Gross weight: 60 kg (130 lb)
- Powerplant: 2 × AMT Olympus

Performance

- Maximum speed: 600 km/h (350 mph, 300 kn)
- Range: 150 km (93 mi, 81 nmi)
