= Alenia Aermacchi Sky-X =

Sky-X
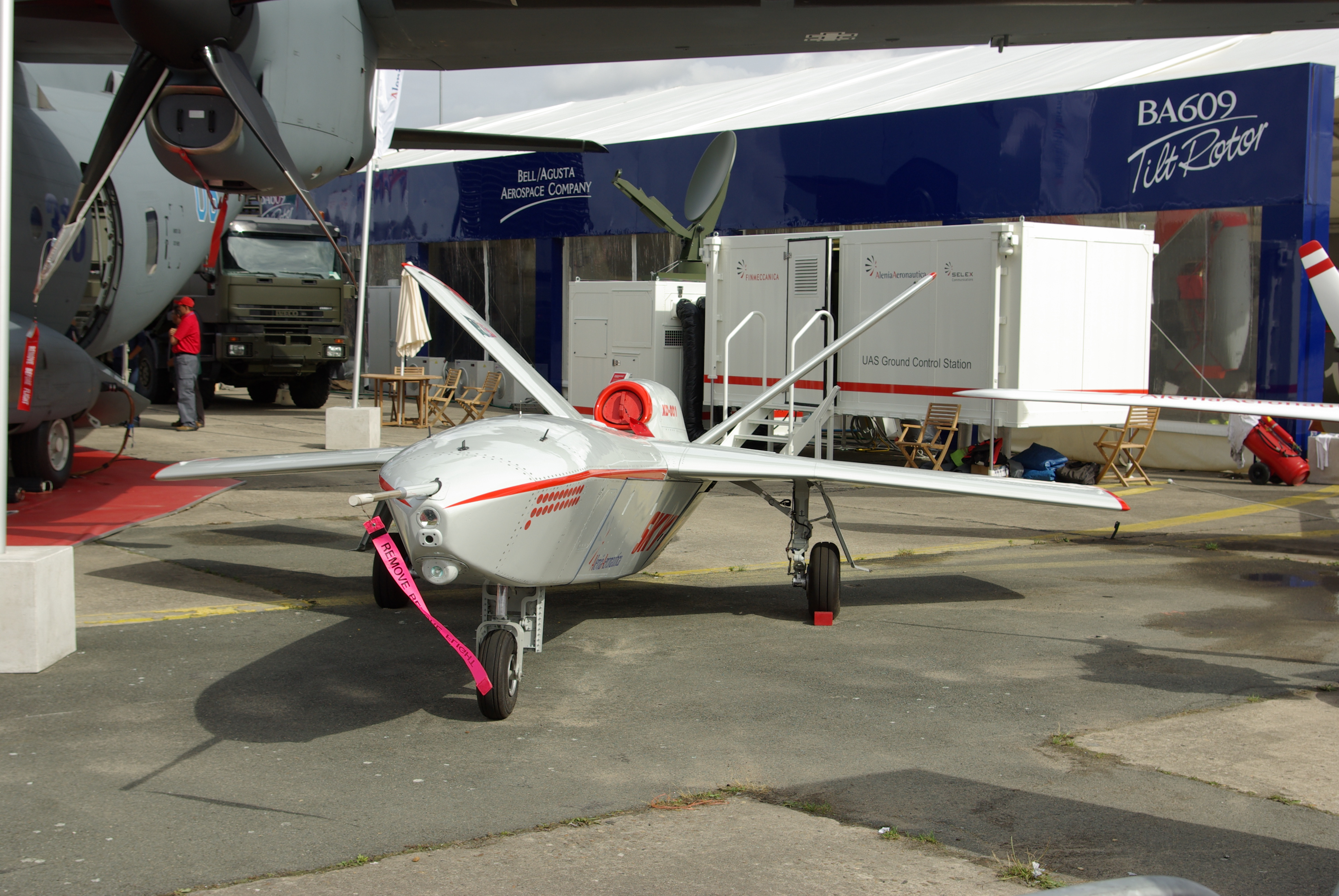
- Sky-X at Paris Air Show 2007

General information
- Type: Unmanned aerial vehicle
- Manufacturer: Alenia Aeronautica
- Primary user: Research prototype
- Number built: 1

History
- First flight: 29 May 2005

The Alenia Aeronautica Sky-X is a self-financed unmanned aerial vehicle (UAV) for demonstration and research purpose; on May 29, 2005, it became the first European-designed UAV in the over 1000 kg category to fly with success.

== Design and development ==
The roll-out of the Sky-X was carried out by Alenia in May 2003 and, after 18 months of development, it first flew at the Swedish test area of Vidsel.

After a first test campaign conducted with ground control in order to explore the whole flight envelope the development has focused on the autonomous flight systems, in particular the ATOL system (Assisted take off and landing), the collision avoidance, the precision autonomous navigation, the sight autonomous landing and attack and the autonomous formation fly capabilities. In 2008 the Sky-X demonstrated the capability of carrying out the join-up maneuvers necessary for in-fly refueling with an Alenia C-27J.

Thanks to the technologies developed for the Sky-X in 2005 Alenia Aeronautica has joined the nEUROn European program with a consistent development share.

== Specifications (Sky-X) ==
Data from

General characteristics

- Length: 7.8 m (25 ft 7 in)
- Wingspan: 5.94 m (19 ft 6 in)
- Height: 1.86 m (6 ft 1 in)
- Empty weight: 1,000 kg (2,205 lb)
- Gross weight: 1,200 kg (2,646 lb)
- Max takeoff weight: 1,450 kg (3,197 lb)
- Powerplant: 1 × Microturbo TRI 60-268 turbojet engine, 4.43 kN (1,000 lbf) thrust

Performance

- Maximum speed: 648 km/h (403 mph, 350 kn)
- Cruise speed: 482 km/h (300 mph, 260 kn)
- Service ceiling: 7,260 m (23,820 ft) +
