= Merops =

Merops may refer to:

- Merops (mythology), the name of several figures from Greek mythology
- Merops (bird), a genus of bee-eaters
- Merops (weapon), an anti-drone weapons system
- MEROPS, an on-line database for peptidases
- Aselsan MEROPS (Multi-spectral Extended Range Optical Sight), a gimbal sight for air surveillance and targeting
