= Hornet drone =

Hornet drone may refer to

- Destinus Hornet, a Swiss military drone
- Granta Hornet, a Lithuanian reconnaissance UAV
- Perennial Autonomy Hornet, a US medium strike drone
- Teledyne FLIR Black Hornet, a Norwegian micro UAV
