= Nathan Nwachuku =

Nigerian technology entrepreneur

- Nathan Nwachuku during the 2026 African Chiefs of Defense Conference in Angola
- Born: May 02, 2003 (age 23); Port Harcourt, Nigeria
- Occupation: Entrepreneur
- Known for: Co-founder, Terra Industries
- Title: Chief Executive Officer

Nathan Nwachuku (born May 2, 2003) is a Nigerian technology entrepreneur. He is the co-founder and chief executive officer of Terra Industries, a defence technology company. He previously co-founded Klas, an online education platform.

== Early life and education ==
Nwachuku grew up in Port Harcourt, Nigeria, and completed his secondary education at Graceland International School.

On his fifteenth birthday, he suffered a serious eye injury that left him blind in one eye, and he spent about five months out of school. During this time, he tried to teach physics classes online but could not find a platform suited to live teaching, an experience he later described as the origin of Klas.

After completing secondary school in August 2020, he was offered a scholarship to study software engineering at Carleton University in Canada, but he deferred his admission and taught himself to code instead.

== Career ==
=== Klas ===
At 18, Nwachuku co-founded Klas, a platform that lets teachers and other creators run paid live classes, with scheduling, payments, and video conferencing built in. It raised a $130,000 angel round in March 2022, joined the Techstars accelerator later that year and raised a $1 million pre-seed round in 2024. The company reported more than 5,000 online schools and about 300,000 learners in over 30 countries.

=== Terra Industries ===
Nwachuku began working with Maxwell Maduka in 2024, building drones to order for clients operating critical infrastructure under the name Terrahaptix. The startup, now called Terra Industries, makes unmanned aerial vehicles, ground vehicles, sentry towers, and a unified software for governments and infrastructure operators. Nwachukwu is its chief executive, and Maduka is its chief technology officer.

Terra Industries emerged from stealth in January 2026 with an $11.75 million funding round led by 8VC and including Lux Capital and Valor Equity Partners. It raised a further $22 million in February 2026 and $18 million in August 2026, bringing its seed funding to about $52 million. Nwachuku has said the company aims to become Africa's first defence prime contractor.

== Views on African defence manufacturing ==
In April 2026, at a demonstration of Terra's interceptor drones, mine-clearing vehicles and battlefield software for Nigerian military and government officials. Nwachuku told Reuters that the company was ready for "battlefield operations and actual deployment onto the frontlines".

That July, Nwachuku addressed the African Chiefs of Defense conference in Luanda, Angola. He argued that African states should manufacture their own drones instead of depending on imported systems, that such systems should be open enough to be repaired and adapted in the field, and that African countries should build a shared intelligence network. He has also said that Africa cannot industrialise without first solving insecurity, and that Terra's long-term ambitions extend to the Global South.
