= Swift Beat =

American defense technology company

Swift Beat, LLC
- Type: Private
- Industry: Defense industry, Unmanned aerial systems, Artificial intelligence
- Founded: 2023
- Founders: Eric Schmidt
- Headquarters: Menlo Park, California, U.S.
- Key people: Eric Schmidt (CEO)

Swift Beat, LLC is an American defense technology company headquartered in Menlo Park, California. The company develops artificial intelligence-enabled unmanned aerial vehicles for reconnaissance, strike, and counter-drone missions and works closely with the Armed Forces of Ukraine. The company is led by former Google CEO Eric Schmidt and originated from the drone project previously known as White Stork.

== History ==
Swift Beat was founded in 2023 and evolved from an initiative launched by Eric Schmidt to develop low-cost autonomous drones for use in the Russo-Ukrainian war. The company maintains a significant presence in Ukraine, where new drone systems are developed jointly with Ukrainian partners and tested under operational battlefield conditions.

In July 2025, Ukrainian Defense Minister Rustem Umerov and Eric Schmidt signed a memorandum of long-term strategic cooperation in the presence of President Volodymyr Zelenskyy. The agreement provides for the expansion of production of interceptor drones, reconnaissance drones, and strike drones for Ukraine. According to the Office of the President of Ukraine, several hundred thousand drones are expected to be delivered during the first year of the partnership.

== Company profile ==
Swift Beat develops autonomous military drone systems based on artificial intelligence. Its portfolio includes interceptor drones for countering hostile UAVs, reconnaissance drones, FPV drones, and medium-range strike drones. The systems are designed to remain operational even in environments with intensive electronic warfare by relying on computer vision and autonomous navigation.

The company's corporate structure is not entirely transparent, reflecting the sensitive nature of its military activities. According to media reports, Swift Beat is owned by Volya Robotics, a company headquartered in Tallinn, which is itself owned by Eric Schmidt. Swift Beat is also closely associated with Perennial Autonomy, another drone start-up founded by Schmidt.

According to the Office of the President of Ukraine, the company works with Ukrainian engineers and the Armed Forces of Ukraine to develop not only drones but also systems for countering cruise missiles and ballistic missiles, as well as automated defense platforms.

== Products ==
According to the Kyiv Post, Swift Beat is involved in the development of the Hornet weapon system. The Hornet is a low-cost strike drone with a range of up to approximately 200 kilometers and a payload of around five kilograms, although other reports cite a range of roughly 150 kilometers and production costs between US$5,000 and US$10,000. Each Hornet carries an explosive payload comparable to that of a heavy artillery shell and can strike targets far behind the front lines without risking personnel. The system enabled Ukraine to conduct attacks against Russian logistics, military infrastructure, and critical supply routes in 2026.
