= JEDI Shahed Hunter =

Ukrainian drone

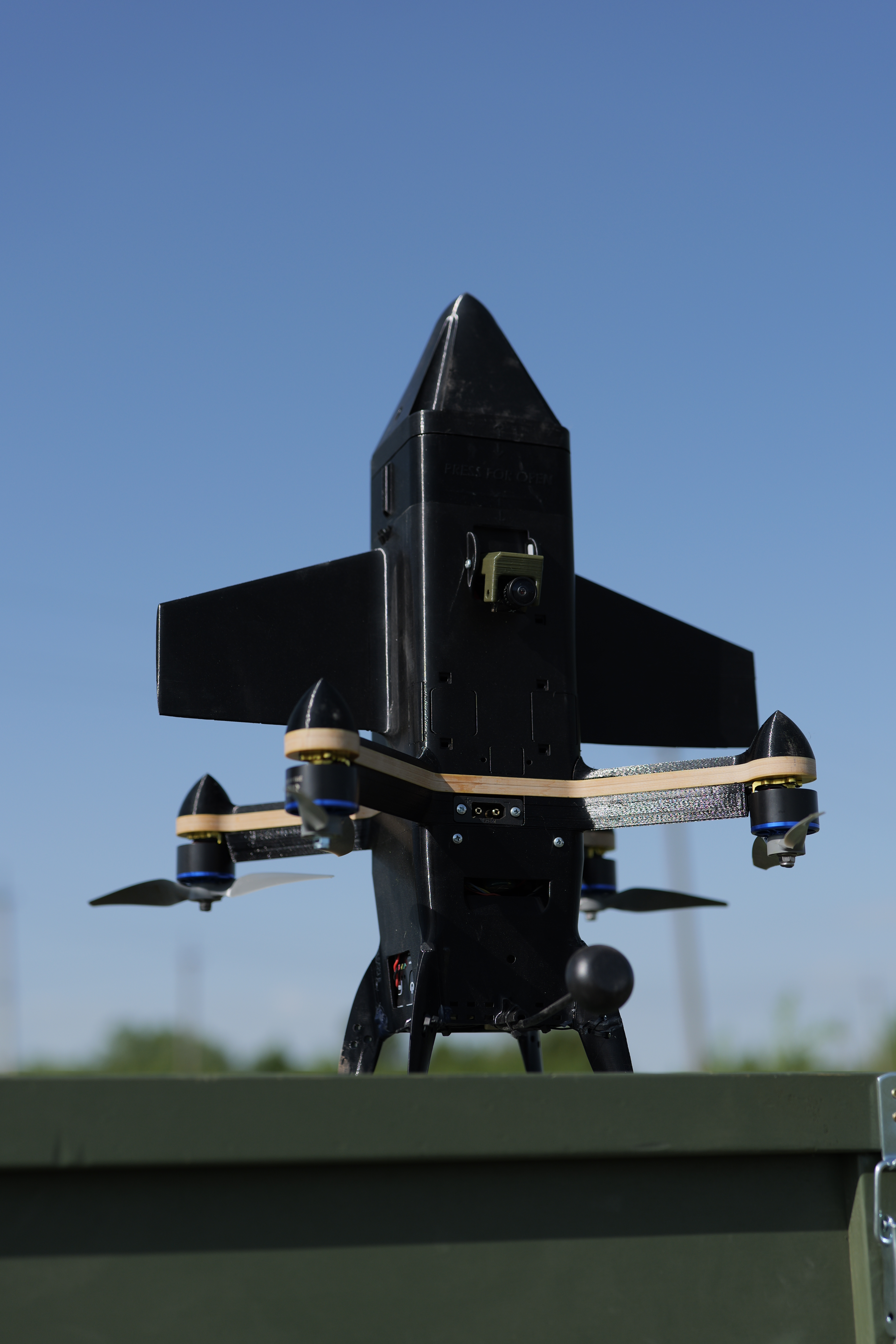
- Type: Interceptor drone
- Place of origin: Ukraine

Production history
- Designer: Neo Drones Tech

The JEDI Shahed Hunter is a Ukrainian unmanned aerial vehicle system (UAS) designed for the interception of strike and reconnaissance unmanned aerial vehicles. It was codified by the Ministry of Defence of Ukraine in 2026 for use by the Defense Forces of Ukraine.

== Design ==
JEDI Shahed Hunter is a Ukrainian multirotor unmanned aerial vehicle (UAV) with vertical takeoff capability powered by electric motors. The system has a takeoff weight of approximately 4 kg and is equipped with both optical and thermal imaging sensors, allowing operation in various weather, environmental, and lighting conditions. The platform utilizes an analog video transmission system compatible with both daylight and thermal imaging payloads. The interceptor is designed for the engagement of airborne threats, including strike and reconnaissance unmanned aerial vehicles. The system integrates radar-based target designation and is capable of automatically receiving target coordinates and guidance data from radar stations. Based on this information, the interceptor can be automatically guided into the target engagement area with minimal operator involvement. JEDI Shahed Hunter incorporates an autonomous terminal guidance system for thermal imaging seekers, enabling the interceptor to lock onto and track aerial targets during the final phase of interception. The interceptor carries a warhead of approximately 500 g and is capable of reaching speeds exceeding 350 km/h. It can operate at altitudes of up to 6 km and engage targets within an airspace radius of up to 40 km.

The system supports remote operation via internet-based communication infrastructure, enabling control, telemetry exchange, and video transmission over long distances through networks such as Starlink and other IP-based communication channels. Two independent communication systems are supported:

- ELRS 2.4 GHz digital radio control link;
- Ukrainian FHSS (Frequency-Hopping Spread Spectrum) communication system with enhanced resistance to electronic warfare and interference.

The system was developed specifically to counter strike UAVs such as Shahed, Geran, and Gerbera, as well as reconnaissance platforms including ZALA and Supercam.

== Development ==
JEDI was developed in Ukraine in 2025 by Neo Drones Tech, a company founded during the Russian invasion of Ukraine.

In March 2026, the Ministry of Defence of Ukraine codified and approved for operational use the JEDI Shahed Hunter unmanned aerial system intended to engage Shahed-, Geran-, and Gerbera-type strike drones, as well as intercept ZALA and Supercam reconnaissance UAVs.

== Gallery ==
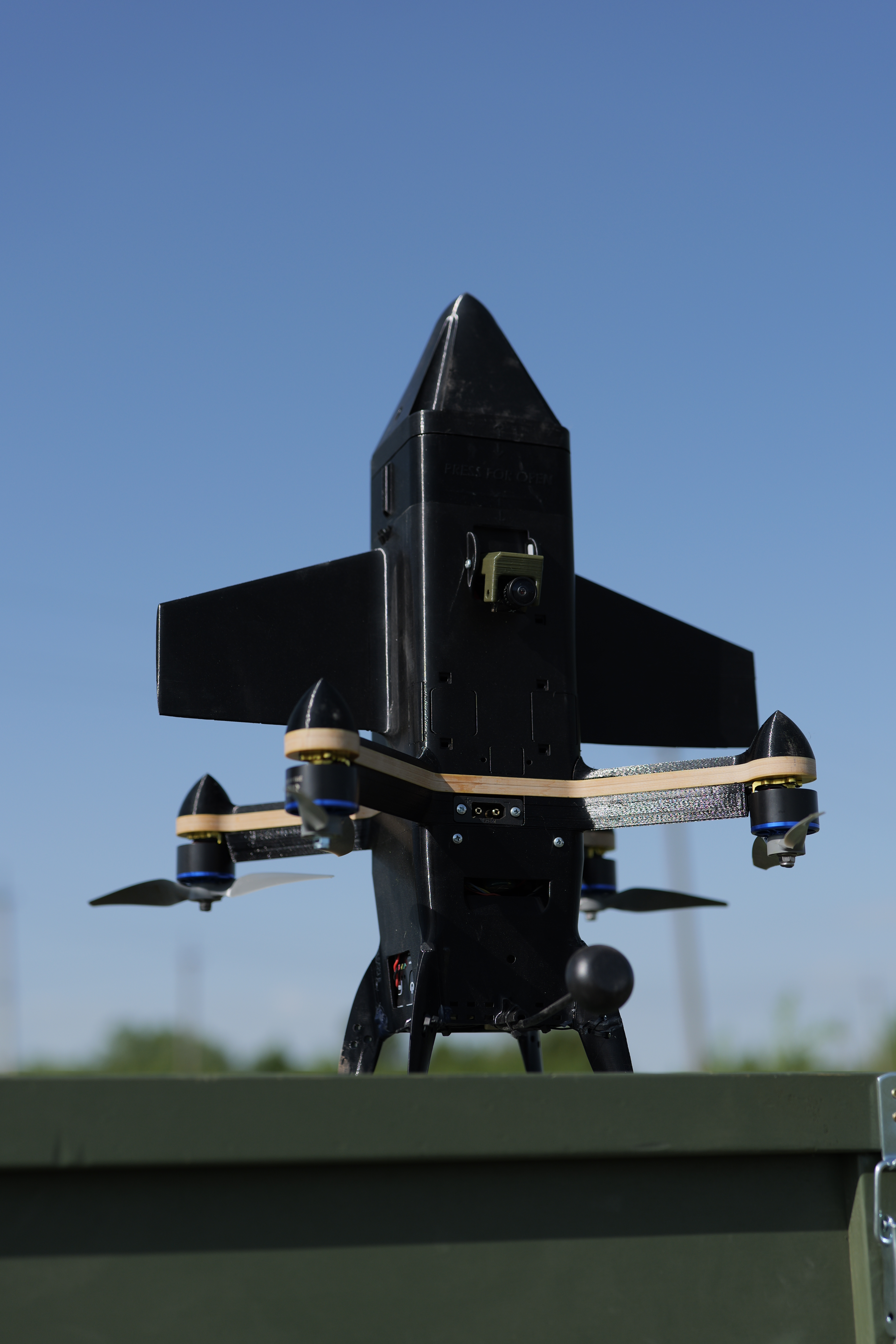

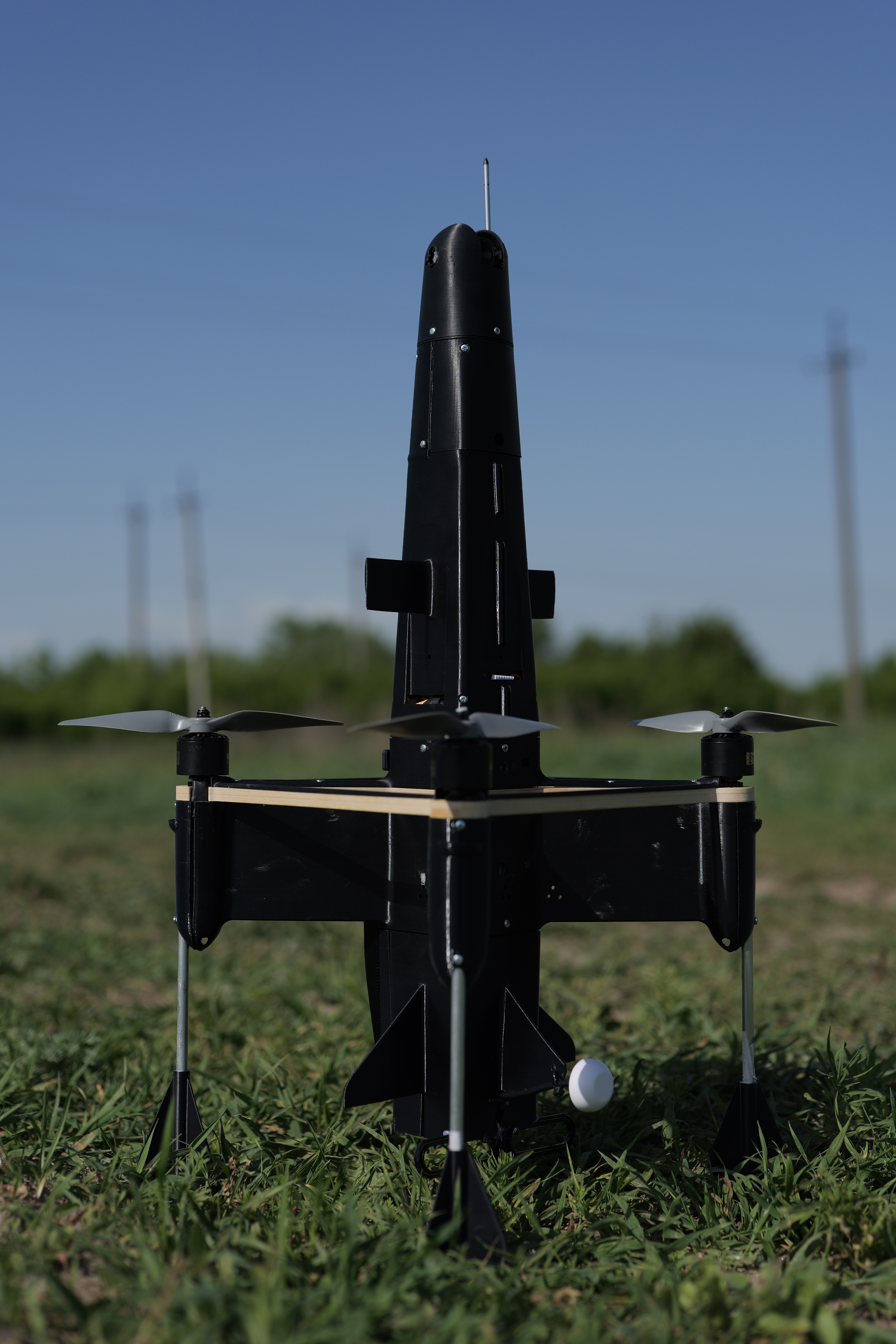

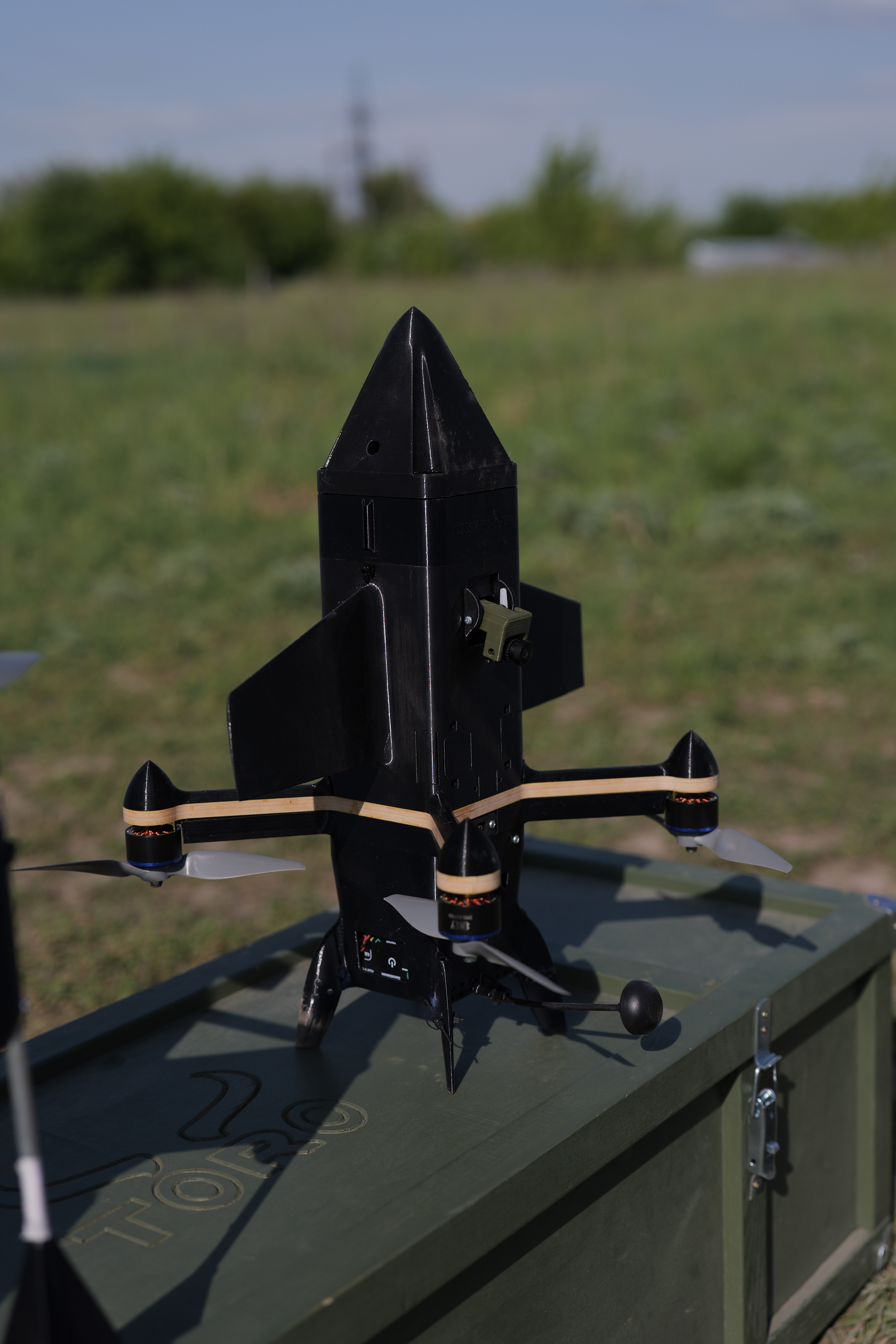

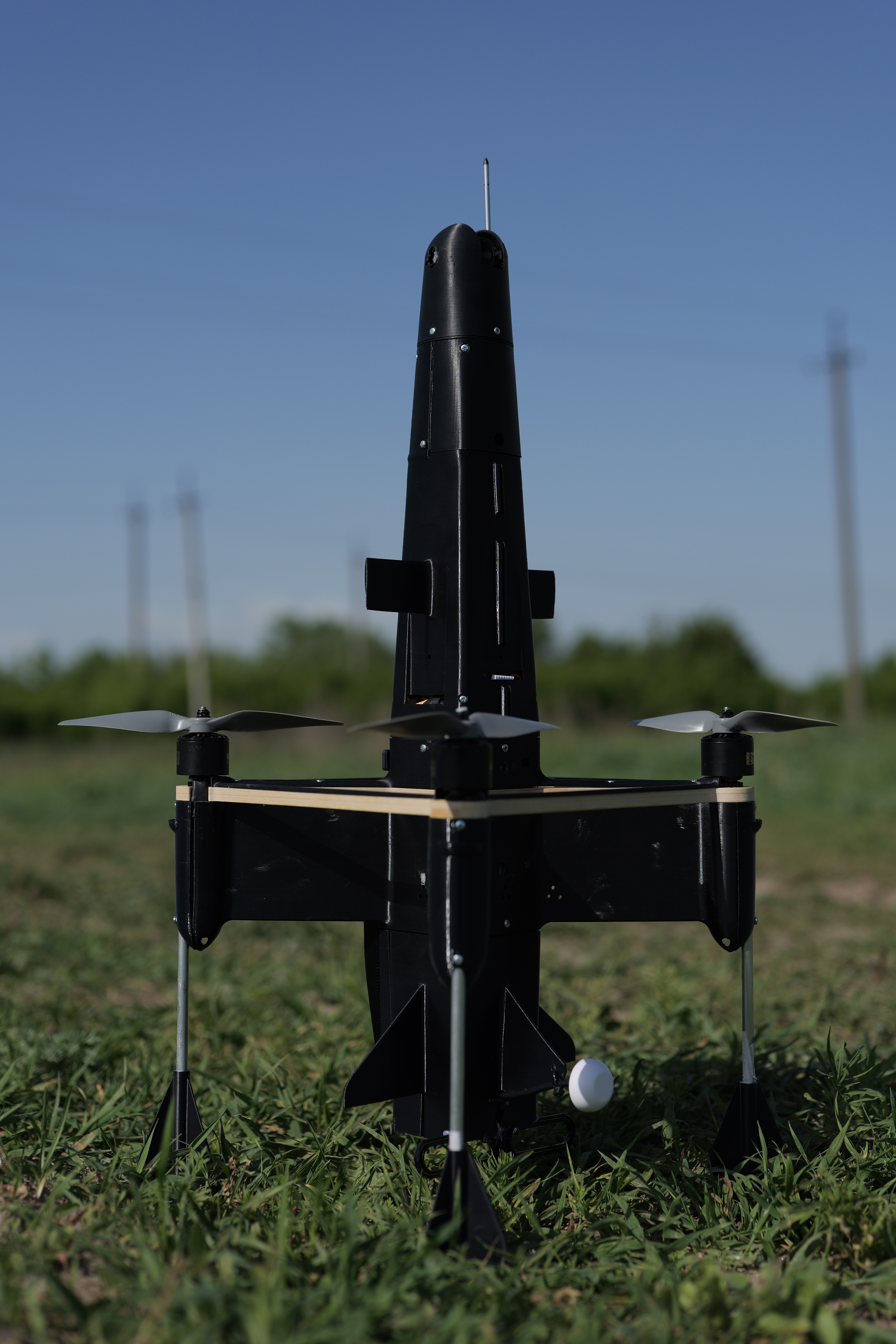

== See also ==
- Interceptor drone
- Defense industry of Ukraine
