= OSIRIS UEB-1 =

Ukrainian high-speed interceptor drone

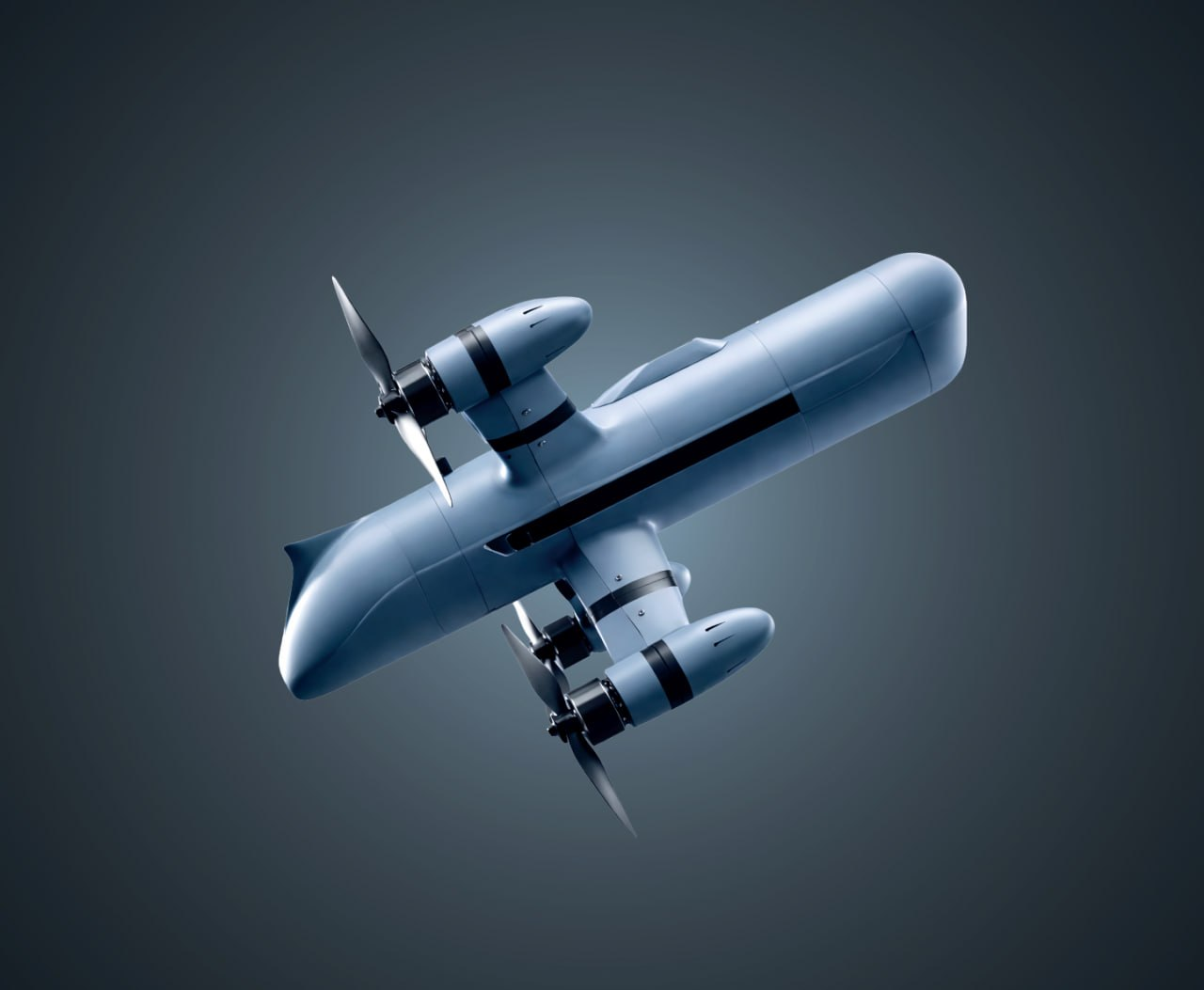

General information
- Type: Counter-UAV interceptor drone
- Manufacturer: OSIRIS AI
- Status: In development / combat-tested

History
- Introduction date: 2026

OSIRIS UEB-1 is a Ukrainian high-speed autonomous interceptor unmanned aerial vehicle (UAV) developed by OSIRIS AI, a defense-technology company with production facilities in Ukraine and Poland and a research and development center in Kraków. The drone was publicly unveiled at the Xponential Europe 2026 international defense forum in Düsseldorf, Germany, in March 2026.

== Development ==
OSIRIS AI is a Ukrainian startup focused on autonomous drone technologies. In 2025, the company received investment from a United States-based partner, which enabled it to expand production capacity and technological development. Following this investment, OSIRIS AI initiated integration partnerships with two Ukrainian drone manufacturers.

The company's core technological platform is OSIRIS DroneOS, a software system that enables unmanned aerial vehicles to operate autonomously by processing data in real time without constant operator input.

The UEB-1 was first demonstrated publicly at the Xponential Europe 2026 exhibition in Düsseldorf from 24 to 26 March 2026, where the OSIRIS AI team showcased the drone's operational capabilities and the company's broader approach to autonomous defense systems.

== Design ==
The UEB-1 is classified as a tactical interceptor rather than a conventional first-person view (FPV) drone. It is engineered specifically for rapid acceleration and stable control under high-thrust loads, enabling it to physically intercept hostile UAVs and other airborne targets.

=== Airframe ===
The airframe is built on a rigid carbon fiber X-frame with dimensions of 370 × 370 × 550 mm. The carbon construction provides structural rigidity and control precision during active pursuit maneuvers. The total weight of the system is 3.1 kg.

=== Propulsion and performance ===
The UEB-1 achieves a maximum speed of up to 315 km/h (196 mph), allowing it to rapidly close distance to high-speed moving targets. Flight endurance exceeds 10 minutes, and the operational range within line of sight reaches up to 18 km, depending on environmental conditions.

=== Avionics and guidance ===
The drone uses onboard data processing to perform interception tasks with minimal operator involvement. An artificial intelligence-based system enables the UAV to autonomously predict and track targets. For terminal guidance, the UEB-1 employs an analog video transmission system operating at 5.8 GHz. Analog transmission was chosen over digital links to ensure a continuous video feed with minimal latency, which is critical during high-speed interception.

The platform is equipped with a standard daytime camera; a configuration for low-light shooting is also available. According to the manufacturer, field testing conducted in eastern Ukraine demonstrated stable video transmission even in environments with significant electronic warfare interference.

=== Payload ===
The UEB-1 features a modular payload system for adaptation to different mission types. It can carry a warhead weighing up to 0.5 kg. The drone is also powered by a 10,000 mAh battery with high discharge power.

== Operational use ==
The UEB-1 is designed for the following mission types:

- Counter-UAV operations
- Interception of high-speed aerial targets
- Tactical strike operations
- Perimeter protection
- Rapid deployment in frontline conditions

According to OSIRIS AI, the platform has already undergone testing in combat environments in Ukraine. The company describes the UEB-1 as its key product in the field of unmanned solutions for modern security challenges.

== Specifications ==
| Parameter | Value |
|---|---|
| Manufacturer | OSIRIS AI |
| Airframe | Carbon fiber X-frame |
| Dimensions | 370 × 370 × 550 mm |
| Total weight | 3.1 kg |
| Warhead weight | 0.5 kg |
| Maximum speed | 315 km/h (196 mph) |
| Flight endurance | >10 minutes |
| Operational range (LOS) | Up to 18 km |
| Video transmission | Analog, 5.8 GHz |
| Battery | 10,000 mAh |
| Guidance | AI-based autonomous tracking (OSIRIS DroneOS) |

== See also ==
- Anti-UAV Defence System
- Aerial warfare in the Russo-Ukrainian war
