= Octopus-100 =

British interceptor drone

- Type: Interceptor drone
- Place of origin: Ukraine; United Kingdom

Octopus-100 is an interceptor drone of Ukrainian design and British manufacture.

== History ==
The project reflects tighter military-industrial London-Kyiv co-operation in the present Russo-Ukraine war, being "the first serial production of a Ukrainian combat drone within a NATO country".

President Volodymyr Zelenskyy demonstrated the Octopus-100 to UK Prime Minister Keir Starmer late October 2025.

Thousands of units are planned to be mass-produced by the UK for Ukraine under the aegis of Build With Ukraine project, a production figure which speaks to the weapon's scalability and modularity (a design philosophy for rapid field deployment).

== Design ==
Technical specifications have not been officially released.

== See also ==
- Interceptor drone
- Defense industry of Ukraine
