= Interceptor drone =

Type of unmanned aerial vehicle

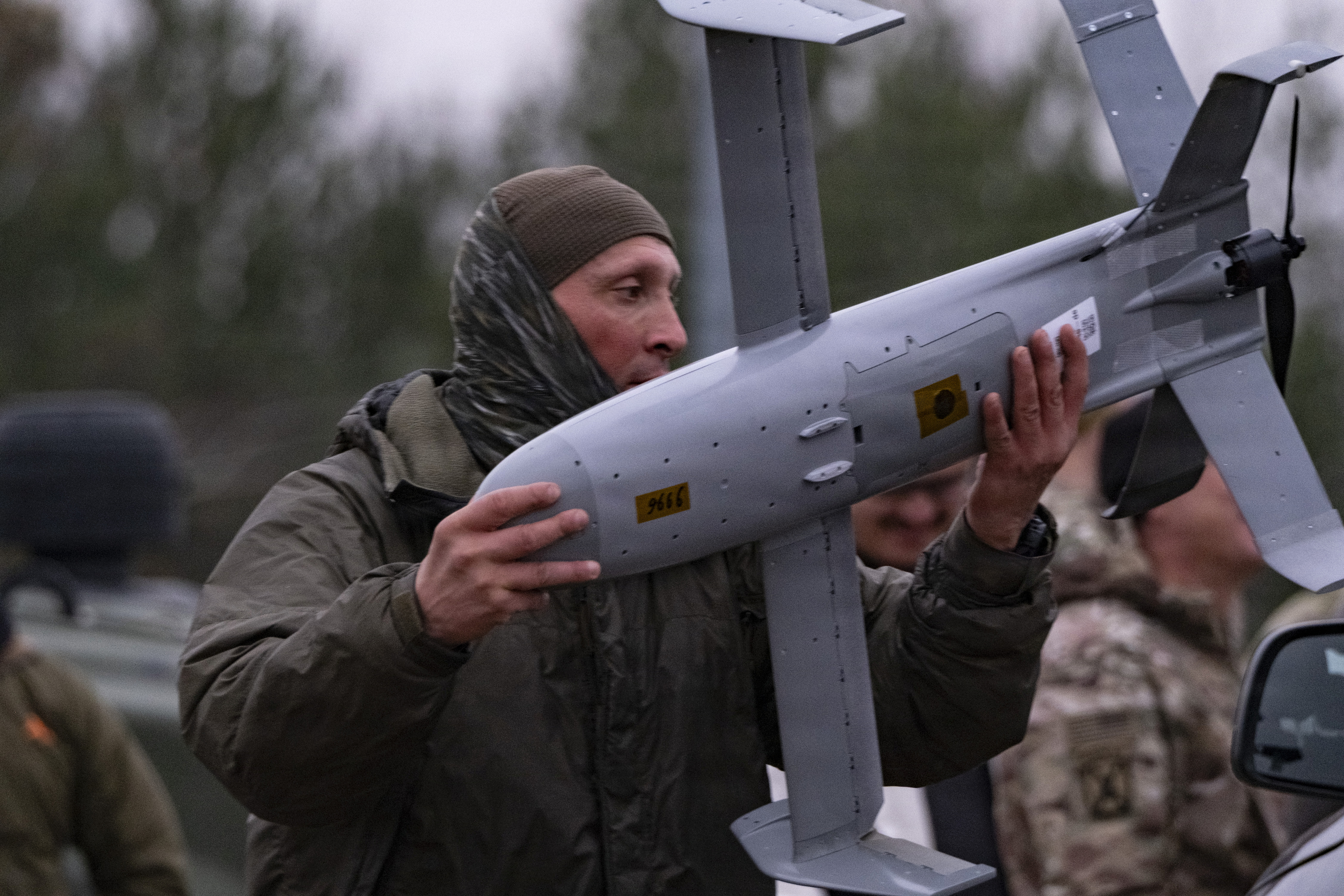
The "Surveyor" interceptor drone in the Merops counter-UAV system

An interceptor drone is a type of unmanned aerial vehicle (also known as drones) which has been primarily designed to neutralize enemy drones. Interceptor drones have become a cost-effective solution compared to more expensive air defence missiles.

== History ==
=== Russo-Ukrainian war ===
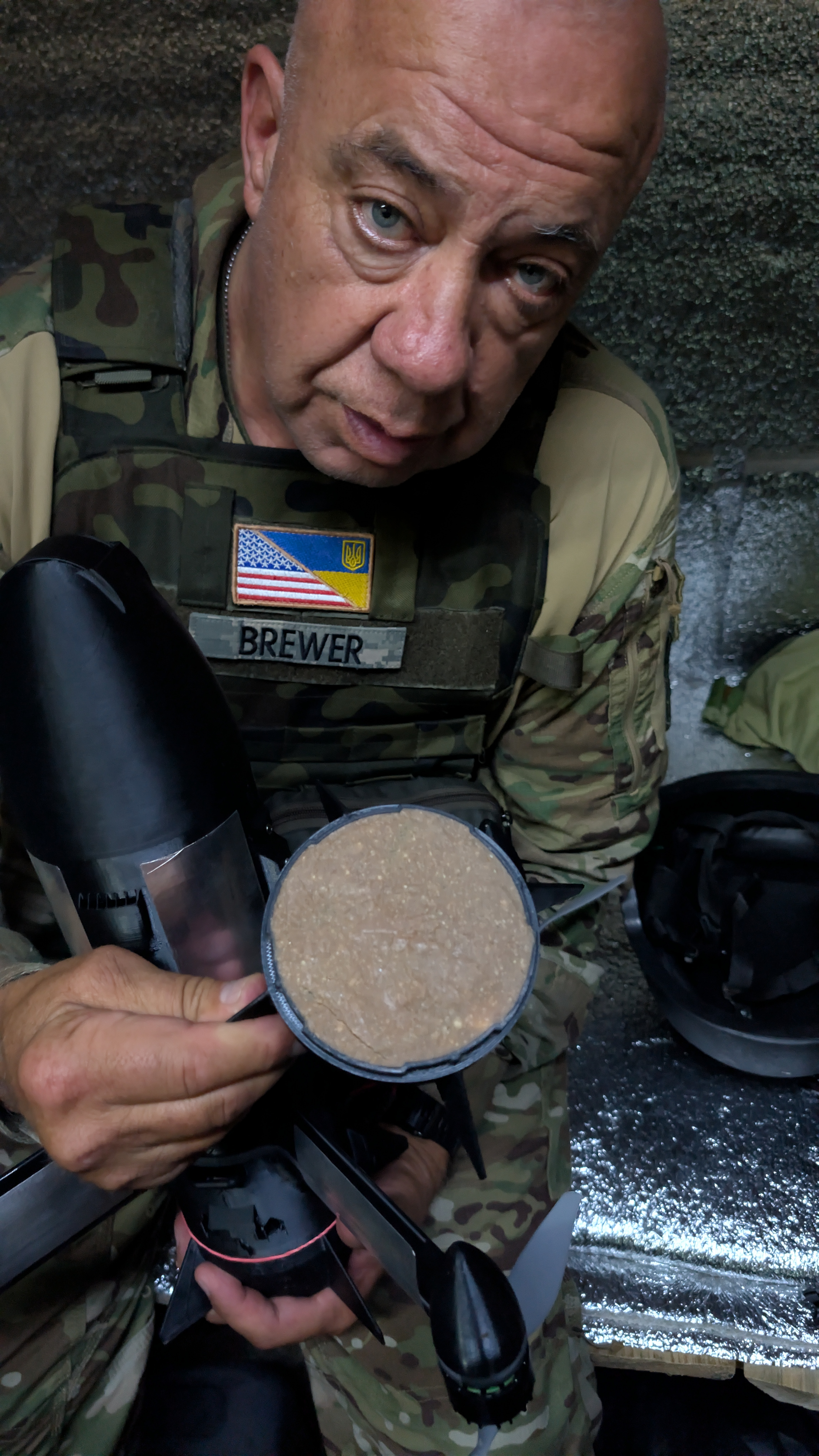
Tom Brewer with a Ukrainian interceptor drone and explosive warhead in 2026.

The use of interceptor drones has become ubiquitous during the Russo-Ukrainian war. The widespread use of Shahed-type kamikaze drones by Russia has led to the development of drones based on First Person View (FPV) drones, but the quadcopter-shaped like a munition. Interceptor drones such as the Sting costs $2,500 compared to more expensive air defence weapons which cost millions of dollars, making them more cost-effective against drones. The Interceptor drones can also be recovered and reused. Later interceptors such as the P1-SUN have adopted fiber-optics cables to counter electronic warfare. Further developments have led to drones such as Octopus-100 which uses computer vision and thermal imaging to autonomously lock on to enemy drones. To counter Russian drones coming over the Black Sea Ukraine has begun using modified Magura drone boats carrying interceptor drones.

In response, Russia has also begun developing interceptor drones to counter Ukrainian attack drones.

=== 2026 Iran war ===
While the war in Ukraine resulted in the development of dedicated counter-UAV interceptor drones they did not achieve widespread adoption outside of Ukraine and Russia. It was during the 2026 Iran war that global demand for interceptor drones spiked.

At the beginning of the war, the US and Gulf States were unprepared to counter the threat of Shahed drone swarms resulting in drones slipping through air defences. Ukraine sent teams of drone experts with interceptor drones to help defend Gulf states against Iranian drone attacks. The US also began deploying Merops drone systems to the Middle East.

== Characteristics ==
Interceptor drones could use several ways to neutralise another drone. Interceptors could eliminate the drone through collision with only kinetic energy, or carry an explosive charge to destroy a drone or a swarm by detonating in the proximity. Drones can also carry jammers to disrupt the control or navigation of the target drone. Net interceptors carry a net launcher that releases a net onto the enemy drone, which interferes with the propellers.

Interceptor drones are often of tail-sitter design

== Countermeasures ==
Increasing the speed of the kamikaze drones could allow them to outrun the interceptors, making the interception of turbojet-powered drones, such as the Geran-3 and Geran-5, challenging for slower propeller-driven interceptors.

Russia has also equipped kamikaze drones with rear-view cameras, allowing them to detect interceptors and take evasive action.

== Products ==
=== Ukraine ===
- Sting
- Bullet
- JEDI Shahed Hunter
- OSIRIS UEB-1
- Osa
- Alexa Spatium
- Octopus-100

== Gallery ==
Bullet

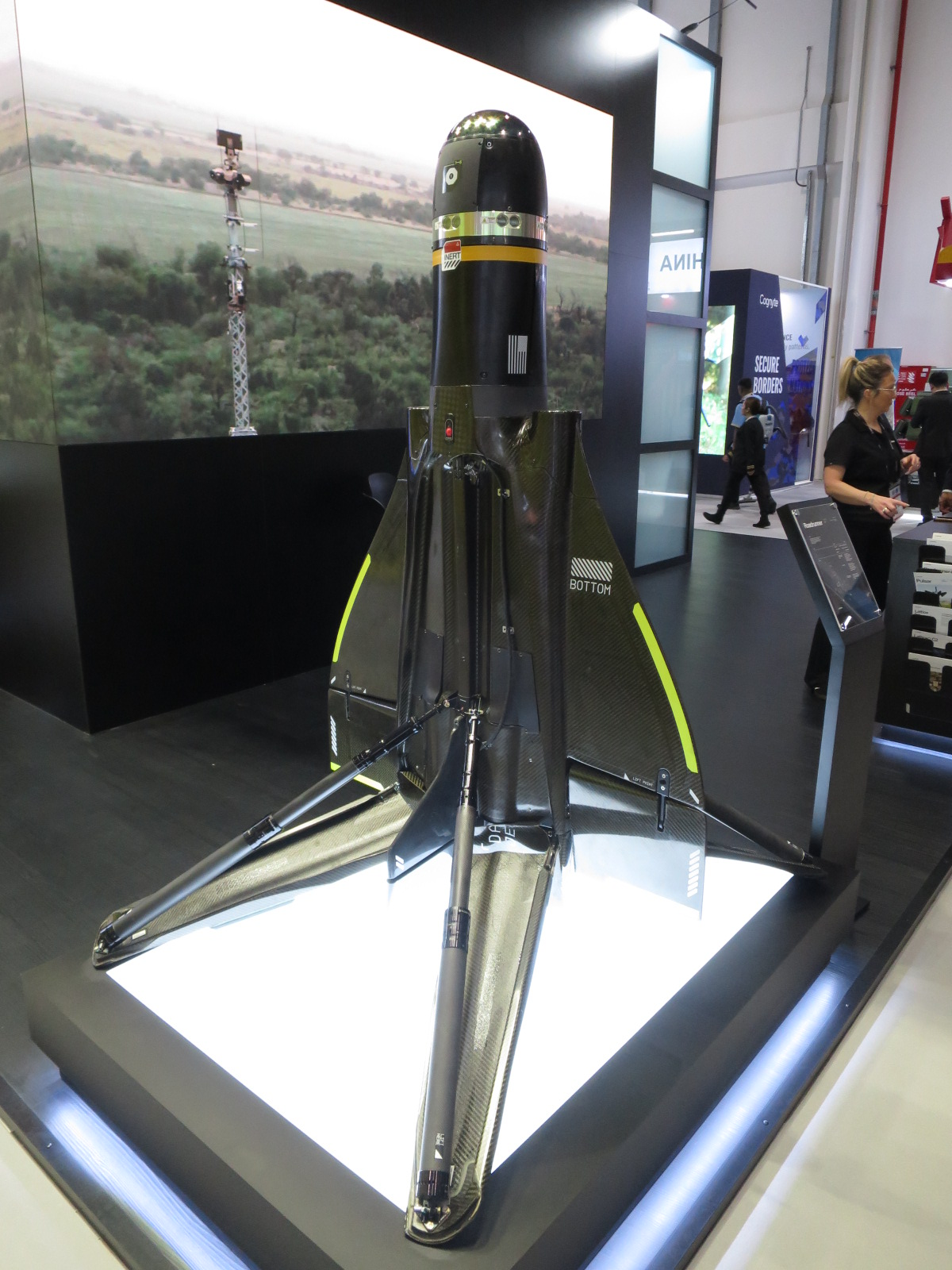
Roadrunner, Anduril Industries

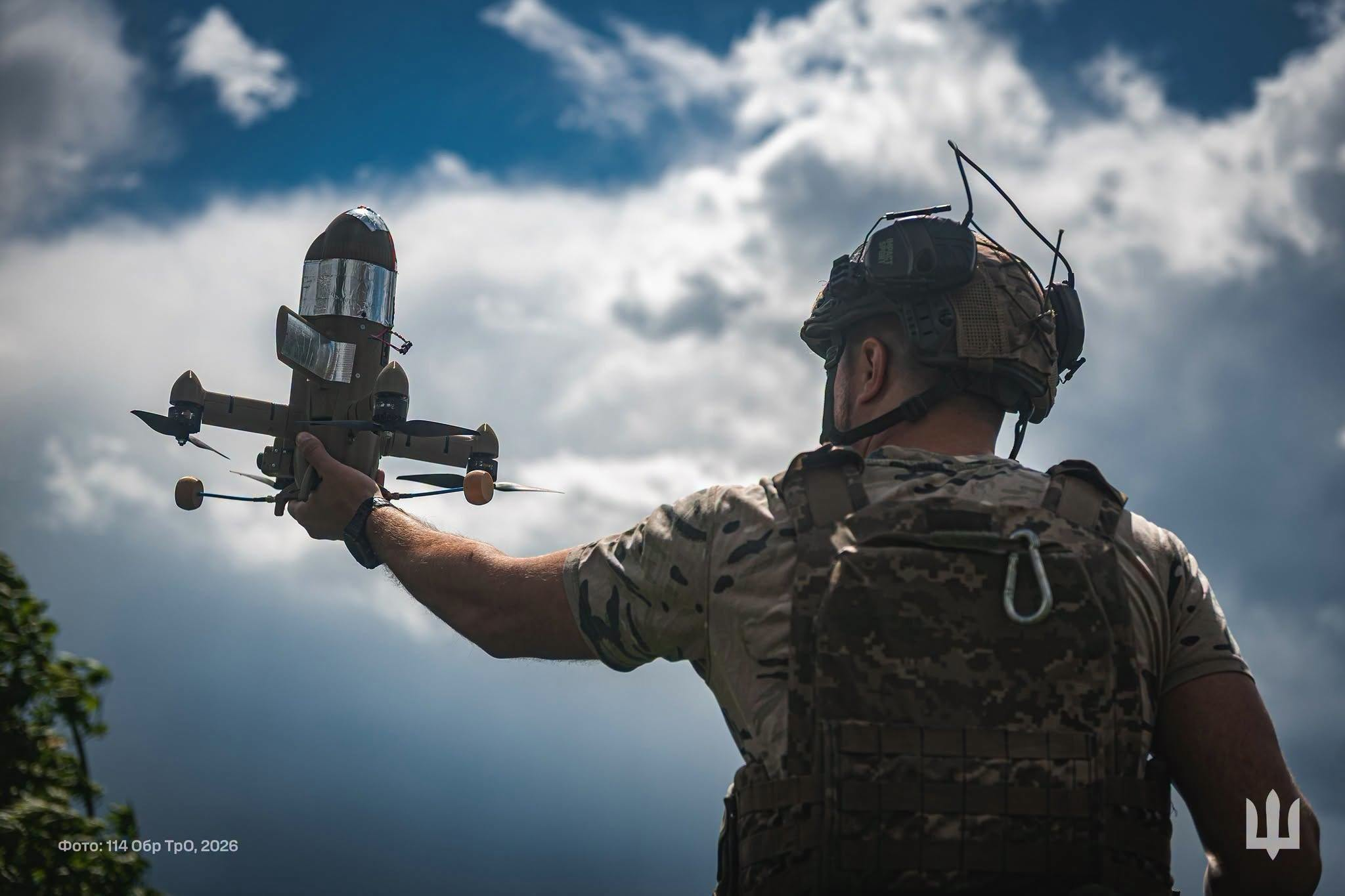
Sting

P1-Sun

Octopus-100

One punch

Alexa Spatium jet-powered interceptor
