= Perennial Autonomy =

American defense technology company

Perennial Autonomy, LLC is an American defense technology company specializing in autonomous and AI-enabled unmanned aerial vehicles and counter-drone systems. The company was founded in 2023 in connection with former Google CEO Eric Schmidt and initially operated under the names "White Stork" and "Project Eagle". Perennial Autonomy became known primarily through the use of its counter-drone systems in the Russian-Ukrainian War and through a framework contract awarded by the United States Department of Defense in May 2026 with a maximum value of US$500 million.

== History ==
Perennial Autonomy originates from a drone project started by Eric Schmidt and founded in 2023 under the name "White Stork". Forbes reported in early 2024 that Schmidt had built the project in secrecy in order to develop AI-enabled military drones for Ukraine. The company recruited personnel from Apple, SpaceX, Google and U.S. federal agencies. Drones were reportedly tested both near Schmidt's family office Hillspire in Menlo Park and in Ukraine. Sebastian Thrun acted as an adviser.

In 2024, the project was renamed "Project Eagle"'. During the Russian invasion of Ukraine, the company developed systems to counter one-way attack drones, particularly Iranian-developed Shahed drones used by Russia. According to reports, the Merops system was first deployed in Ukraine against Russian drones and was later tested or procured by NATO member states such as Poland and Romania.

In January 2026, Perennial Autonomy received a US$5.2 million contract from the Joint Interagency Task Force 401 of the United States Department of Defense for the Bumblebee V2 system. In May 2026, this was followed by a three-year indefinite-delivery/indefinite-quantity framework contract with a maximum value of US$500 million. According to the U.S. Department of Defense, the contract covers AI-enabled counter-drone systems such as Merops, Bumblebee and Hornet, which at that time were also being used by U.S. forces in the area of responsibility of United States Central Command.

Also in 2026, a European production plan was revealed. The Wall Street Journal reported that Perennial Autonomy had concluded an agreement with the Munich-based company Twentyfour Industries to manufacture the Merops system in Germany. The company also hired former German Chancellery chief Wolfgang Schmidt as an adviser.

== Company profile ==
Perennial Autonomy develops and supplies autonomous drones and counter-drone systems for military users. The U.S. Department of Defense describes its systems as combining AI development from Silicon Valley with experience from the Ukrainian theater of war. The aim is to protect U.S. forces and allies against modern aerial threats through rapidly scalable, comparatively low-cost and combat-proven systems.

The publicly known investor and ownership structure is only partially transparent. Several international media outlets describe Eric Schmidt as the founder, initiator or principal financier of the project. In addition to Swift Beat, several other companies, including Volya Robotics and Aurelian Industries, form part of Schmidt's defense technology network and are involved in the development, testing and production of autonomous drone systems. The Ukrainian newspaper Ukrayinska Pravda reported in 2025 that Schmidt was perceived within Ukraine's military technology scene both as an important partner and as a controversial investor pursuing his own interests. The Estonian investment agency Invest Estonia also reported on the project's connection to Estonia and on Volya Robotics as a European company associated with the enterprise. Volya was founded by Schmidt's family office Hillspire.

The business model is focused on the rapid development and delivery of drone systems for government security and defense customers. The cost logic of counter-drone defense plays a central role: instead of using expensive air-defense missiles against comparatively cheap attack and reconnaissance drones, inexpensive interceptor drones are intended to be procured in large quantities. According to Defense News, U.S. Army Secretary Daniel Driscoll stated that Merops costs about US$15,000 per unit, while Shahed drones are estimated to cost between US$30,000 and US$50,000; at higher production volumes, the price of Merops could fall further.

== Products ==
Technologically, Perennial Autonomy's portfolio is based on the combination of drone hardware, computer vision, sensor fusion, jam-resistant communications and autonomous target-tracking capabilities.

=== Merops ===
Perennial Autonomy's best-known system is Merops. It consists of a ground station, launch platforms and the Surveyor interceptor drone. The system can be deployed in either stationary or mobile configurations and is operated by a four-person crew. Training is said to take about two weeks. The Surveyor interceptor can operate remotely or autonomously and uses thermal, radio-frequency or radar sensors for target tracking. It is designed to destroy hostile drones either by ramming them or by detonating near the target.

The performance of Merops became known primarily through its use in Ukraine. Business Insider reported in November 2025 that the system had already recorded more than 1,900 interceptions in combat operations. In May 2026, DefenseScoop, citing company information, reported that Merops had intercepted more than 4,000 Russian drones in Ukraine since mid-2024.

=== Bumblebee ===
Bumblebee V2 is an FPV multirotor system for counter-drone defense. According to the U.S. Army, it is designed to physically neutralize hostile small unmanned aircraft through direct collision. The system is intended to detect, track and strike hostile drones using its own software; the Joint Interagency Task Force 401 described it as a low-cost kinetic countermeasure with a low probability of collateral damage.

=== Hornet ===
Hornet is a medium strike drone or one-way attack drone that media reports associate with Swift Beat, Project Eagle and Perennial Autonomy, and it is among the systems to be delivered to the U.S. military. According to reports, it is a low-cost drone with a range of up to approximately 200 km (120 mi) and a payload of about 5 kg (11 lb); other Ukrainian specialist media have cited a range of around 150 km (93 mi) and production costs in the range of US$5,000 to US$10,000. Each Hornet has an explosive effect comparable to that of a heavy artillery shell and can be used to strike targets far behind the front line without risking personnel, thereby disrupting enemy logistics, among other uses.

== Applications and international deliveries ==
In April 2026, Lithuania purchased 48 Merops interceptor drones. Polish and Romanian military personnel participated in the deployment and testing of the system on NATO's eastern flank, including tests in Romania conducted with NATO participation amid growing concerns over the threat posed by unmanned aerial vehicles near the Ukrainian border.

On 19 May 2026, the United States Department of Defense awarded Perennial Autonomy a three-year contract with a ceiling value of US$500 million to supply counter-unmanned aircraft systems. The contract provides for the delivery of Merops interceptors, Bumblebee quadcopters, and Hornet attack drones.

In September 2026, as part of the Dronopad project run by the Come Back Alive Charity, Perennial Autonomy donated 250 Surveyor interceptor drones for the Merops counter-drone system and five ground control stations to the Ukrainian Defense Forces. The equipment was valued at approximately UAH 44 million.
