= Merops (weapon) =

American counter unmanned air system

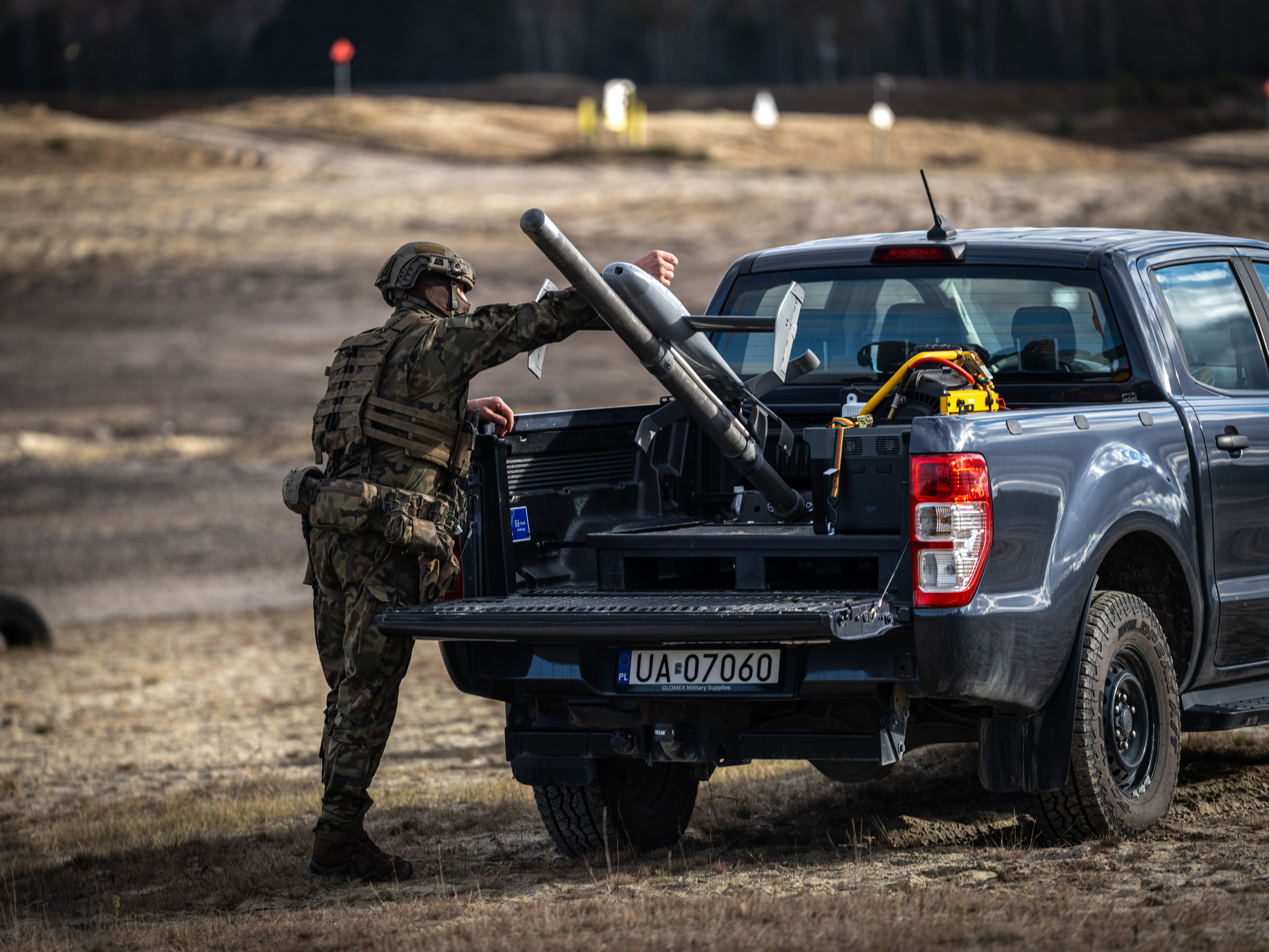
- A Polish soldier prepares to launch a Surveyor interceptor from the Merops system during a training exercise in Nowa Dęba Training Area, Poland, on November 18, 2025.
- Type: Anti-UAV system
- Place of origin: United States

Service history
- In service: 2024–present
- Wars: Russo-Ukrainian war

Specifications
- Launch platform: Vehicle-mounted

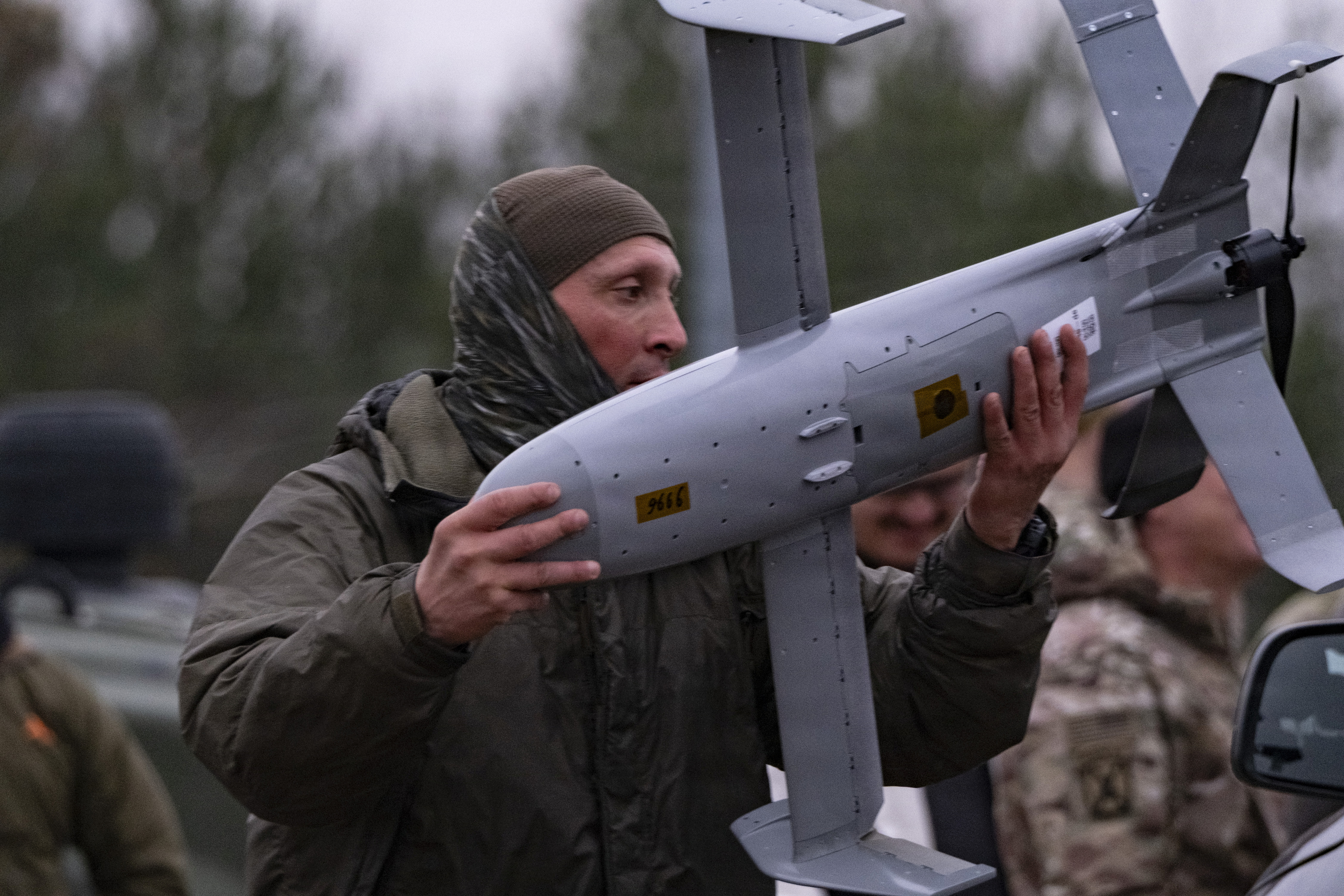
A Polish soldier moves a Surveyor interceptor drone, part of the U.S. Merops counter-drone system, during a training exercise on November 15, 2025.

Merops is a system for countering enemy unmanned aerial systems, or drones. It is being developed by the California-based Project Eagle, a venture of former Google CEO Eric Schmidt.

== Design ==
The Merops system consists of radar and electro-optical sensors, controller gear, and a drone launcher. The sensors detect and locate incoming drones, then pass targeting data to the interceptor or to other friendly systems.

Small enough to fit in the bed of a pickup truck, Merops launches a three-foot, fixed-wing, propeller-driven interceptor drone called "Surveyor" that flies at speeds up to 175 mph (282 km/h). The $15,000 interceptor can be controlled by a human operator or, when satellite and radio links are jammed or unavailable, autonomously home into its target using artificial intelligence and thermal, radio-frequency, or radar sensors. It can ram its target or carry a small warhead. If it misses its target, the interceptor can open a parachute to return to earth for reuse.

It is operated by a four-person crew: commander, pilot, and two technicians. It is designed for ease of use; training takes just two weeks.

The Merops system is designed for short-range defense against larger drones, such as Iranian-designed, Russian-made Shaheds.

== Deployment ==
The Merops system was first deployed by Ukrainian forces around June 2024. As of November 2025, it had reportedly been used to destroy more than 1,900 incoming Russian drones during Russia's invasion of Ukraine. It accounted for some 40% of downed Shaheds, U.S. Army Brigadier General Curtis King, the commanding general of the 10th Army Air and Missile Defense Command, told reporters.

As of November 2025, Merops is deployed by the Polish and Romanian militaries along their borders. Denmark has also declared its intent to acquire Merops.

In November 2025, Brig. Gen. Thomas Lowin, deputy chief of staff operations at NATO Allied Land Command, described NATO members' deployment of Merops as the "first phase" of a two- to five-year effort to build defenses to deter a Russian invasion.

On March 6, 2026, U.S. officials told the Associated Press that the system would be deployed to the Middle East for use in the 2026 Iran war. According to Army Secretary Daniel Driscoll, within eight days, the US was able to purchase about 13,000 Merops drones and praised its performance. The US expressed intent to scale up production even further, which would reduce the cost from the current $15,000 per unit to below $10,000.

According to an article published by G4Media on November 6, 2026, sources from the Romanian Ministry of Defence revealed that the Merops system proved inefficient in combating Russian drones. The system was unable to shoot down the drones involved in a recent incident.

== Development ==
The development of Merops is intended to give the U.S. military and its allies a more cost-effective means of destroying enemy drones than existing interceptor missiles.

The effort was funded by Eric Schmidt, the decabillionaire former CEO of Google, as part of his Project Eagle initiative. In 2023, Schmidt launched the initiative as White Stork, which hired former Pentagon innovation chief Will Roper and at least a dozen employees from Apple, SpaceX, Google, federal government agencies, and Schmidt Futures. In February 2024, the company was renamed Project Eagle. That year, initial products were being tested at Hillspire, the headquarters of Schmidt's family ventures in Menlo Park, California; and in Ukraine.

== Gallery ==
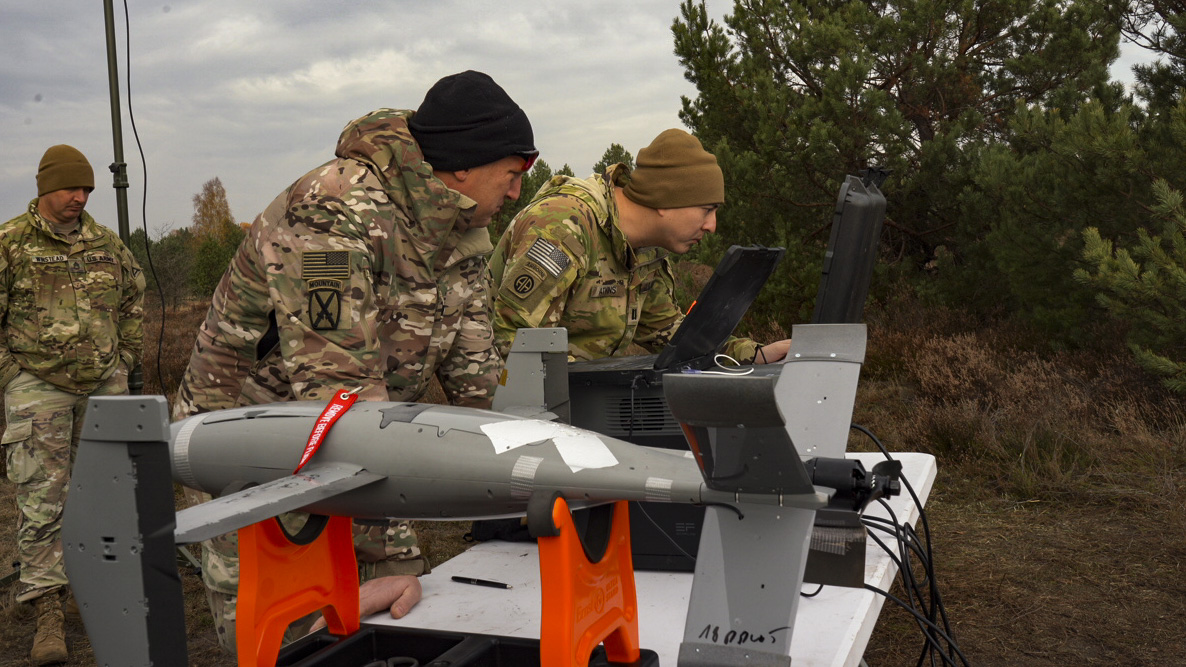
Merops pre-flight procedures

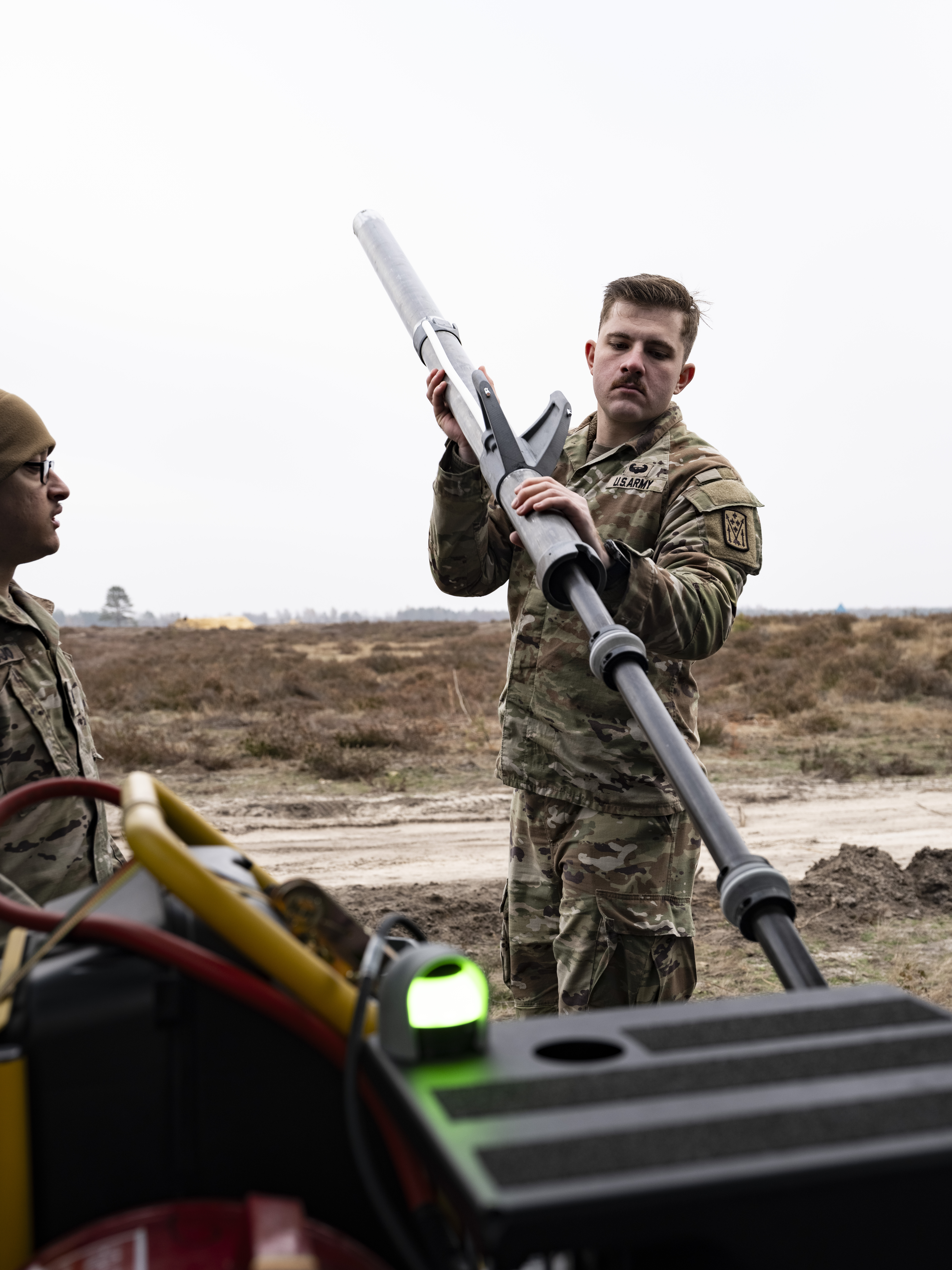
Launching tube being replaced

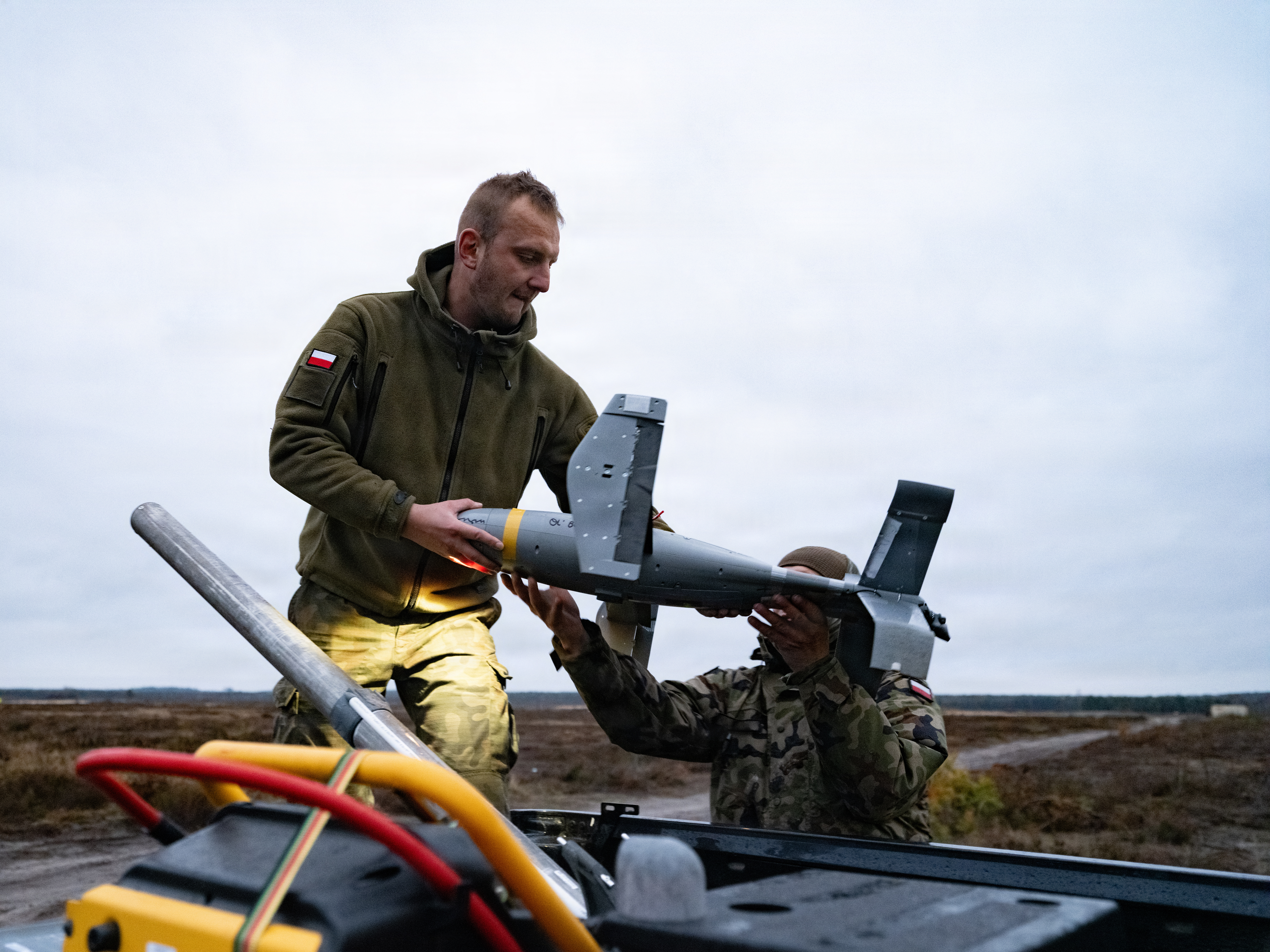
Polish soldiers load Surveyor on the launcher

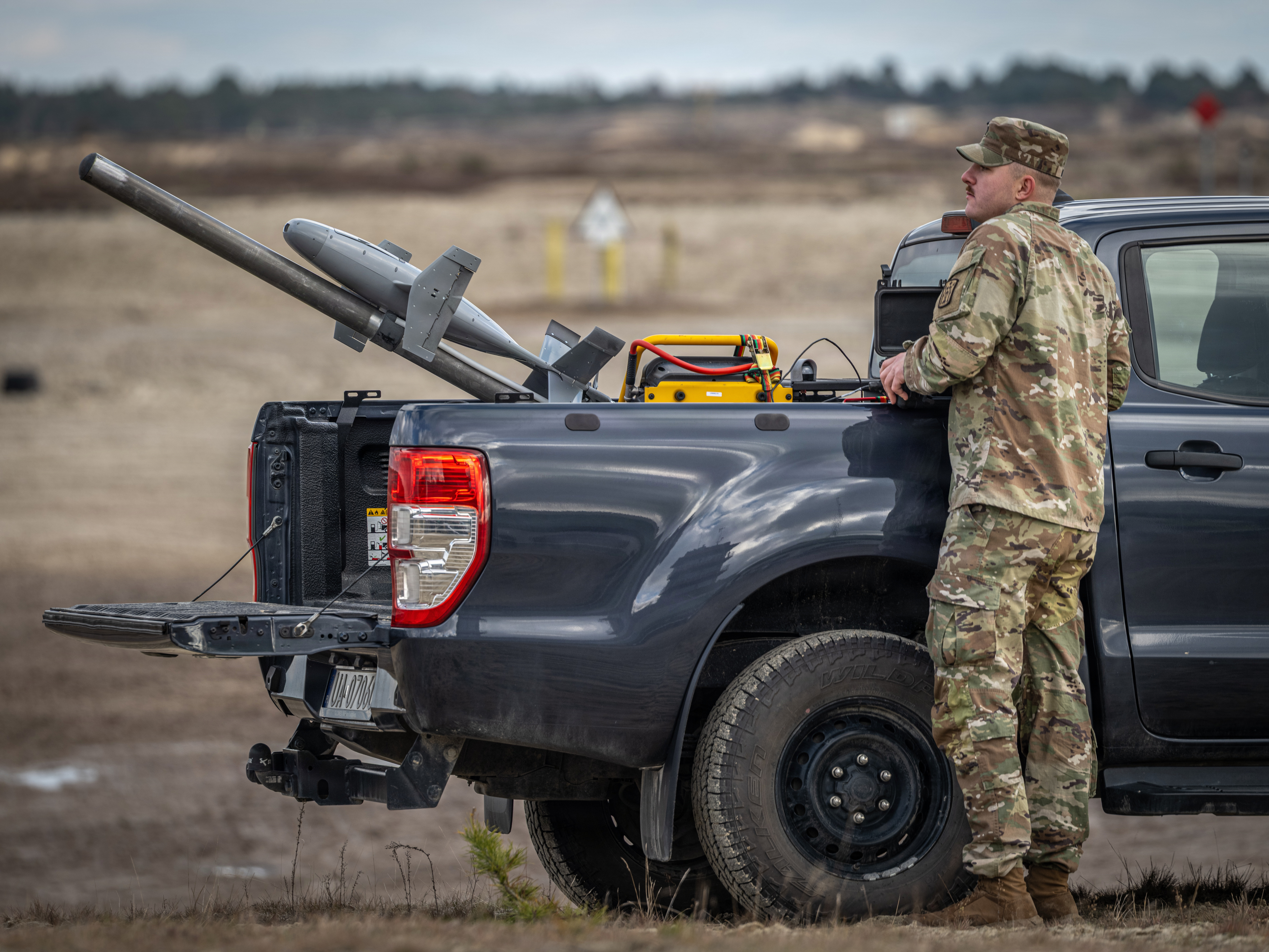
Surveyor interceptor drone ready for launch

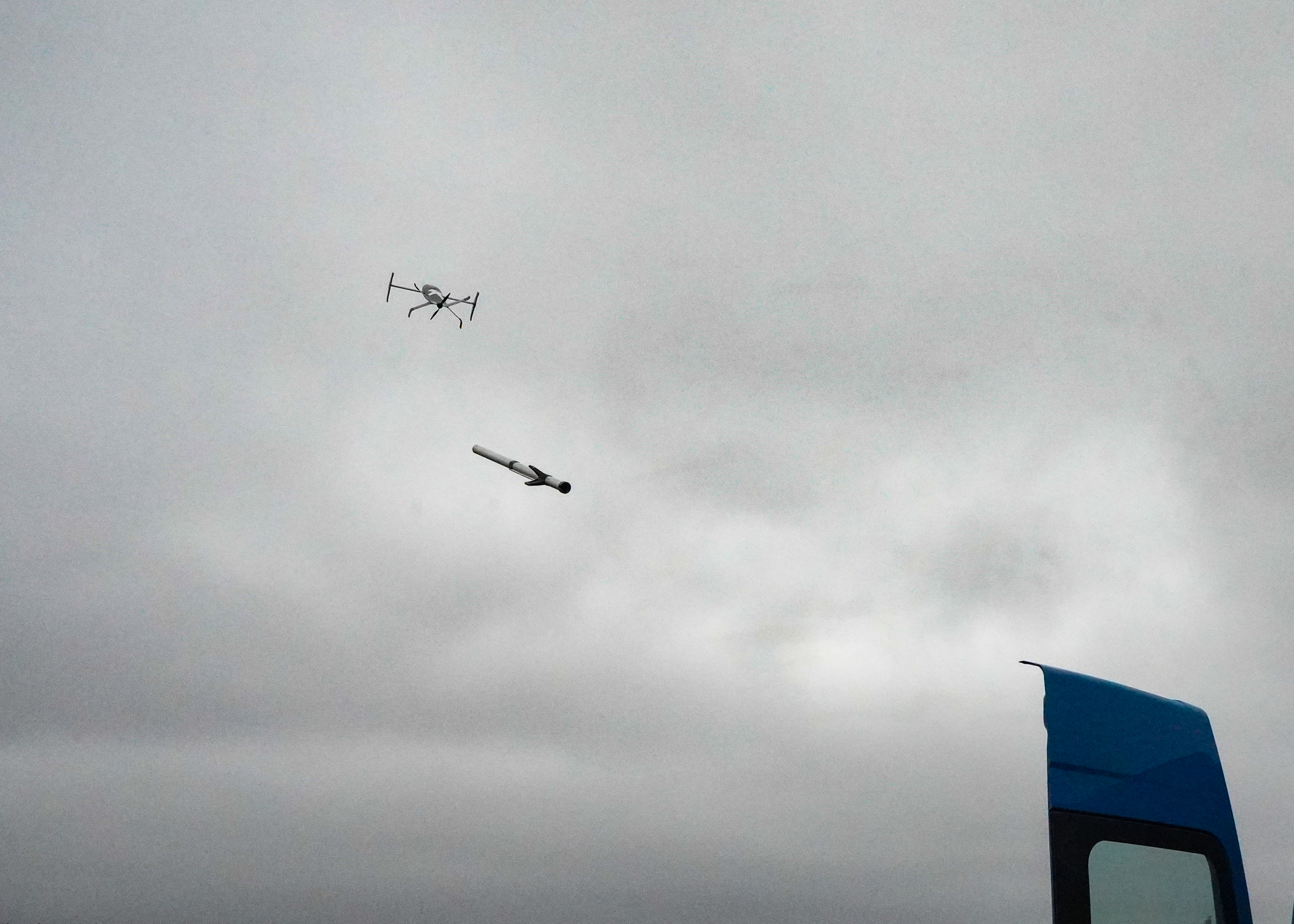
Interceptor detaches from the launch tube

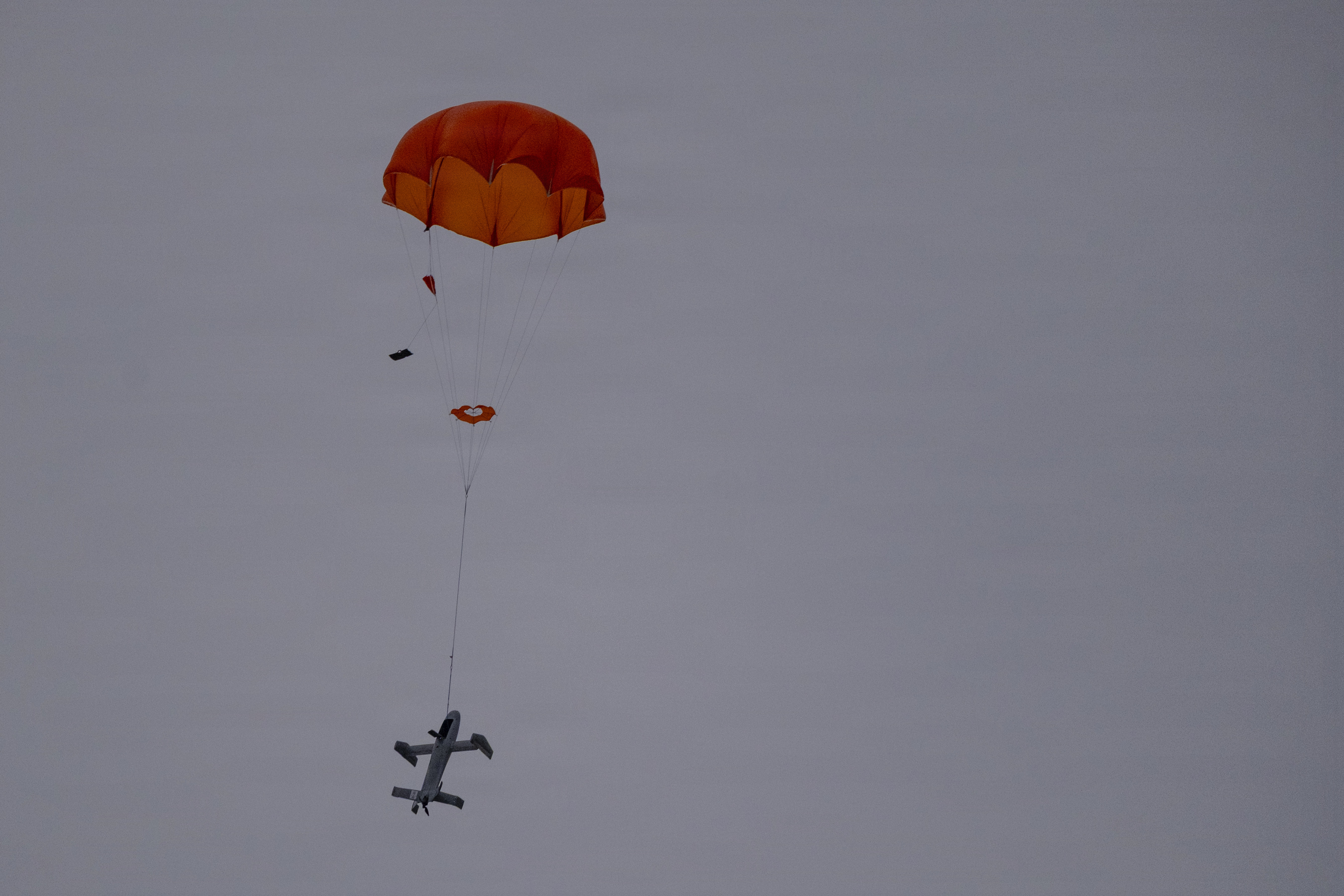
Surveyor drone deploys parachute for recovery
