= Novel Air Concept =

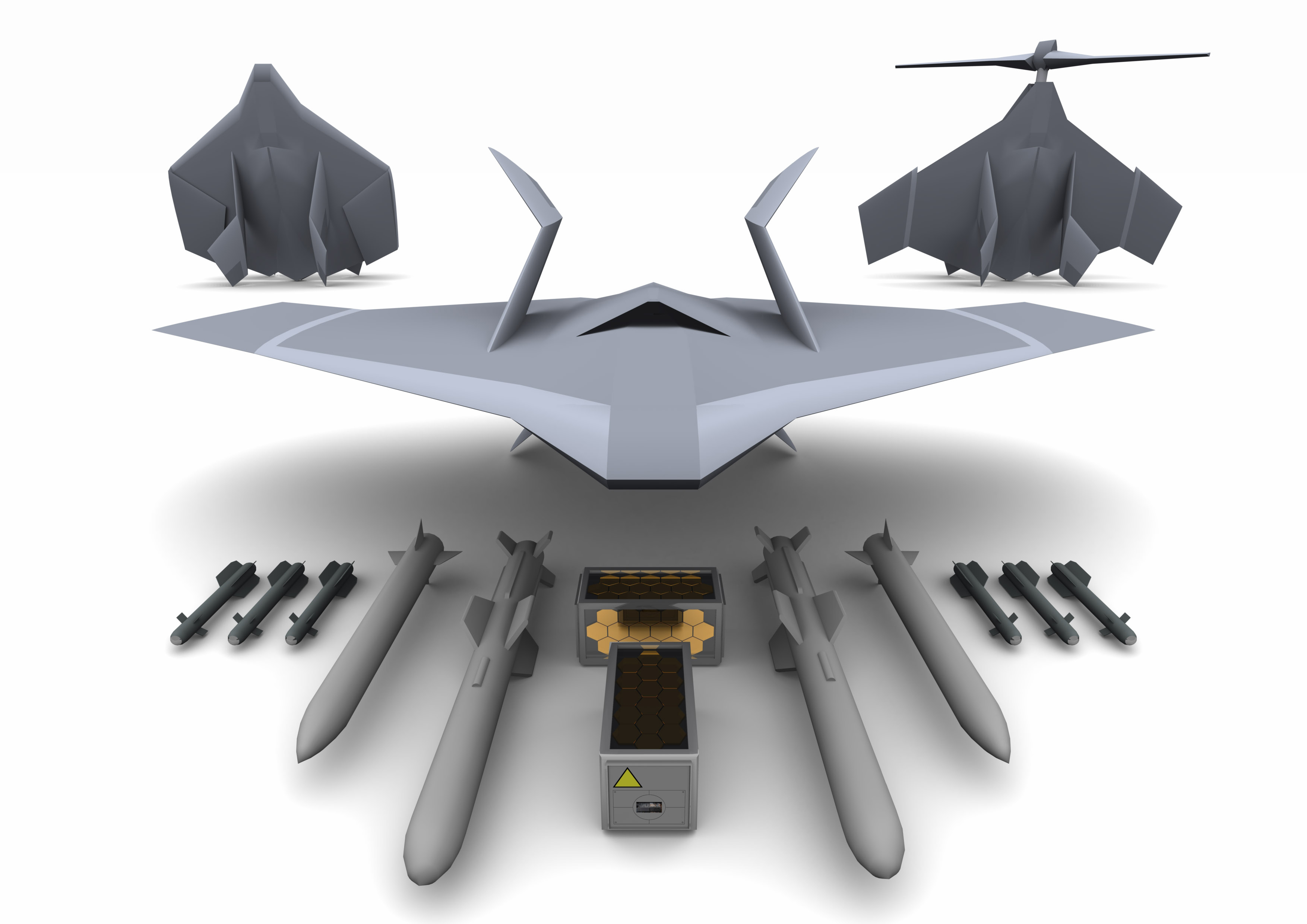
Novel Air Concept, showing different types of weapons

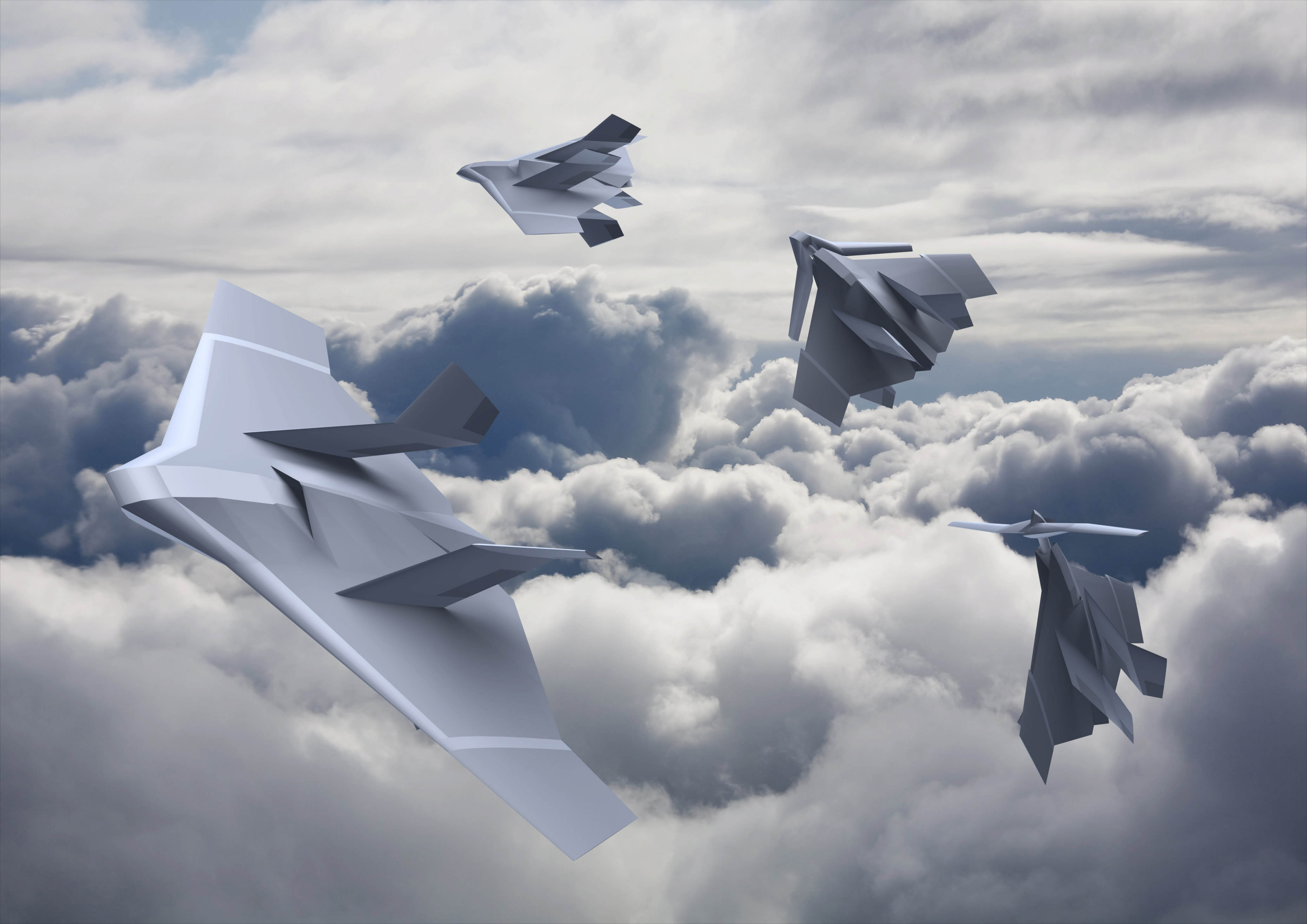
Artist's impression of the aircraft in flight

The Novel Air Concept was a "Capability Vision", an initiative of the British Ministry of Defence to stimulate innovative solutions to long-term defence challenges that may lead to a future capability. This concept, announced in 2009, is for an autonomous UAV which would be able to hover like a helicopter or fold its rotor blades and fly as an aeroplane. The NAC would be able to operate within "urban canyons" and be a test platform for new weapons such as microwave or laser guns.

== Specification ==
The MoD states the Novel Air Concept will be "a reusable uninhabited air system with a radius of action of 1000km and able to survive defended air space. The vehicle is capable of being launched and recovered from land sea and air with the emphasis on ship based operations, and is to be able to operate within the urban canyons inherent in the major city landscape."

== See also ==
- Future of the Royal Air Force
- BAE Systems Taranis
