= Pars robot =

Iranian drone

The Pars robot is an Iranian drone designed to rescue people from drowning. Pars was developed by Amin Rigi and Amir Tahiri at RTS Lab, a lab working on novel robotic innovations for increasing life safety and living conditions.

The drone is an Aerial robot which is designed and made for saving human lives. The first purpose of developing this robot is rescuing people drowning near coastlines. By improving its applications, it can be used in ships and off shore relief stations. It can also be used in other applications such as real-time monitoring of marine and off shore structures. Its price in 2015 is $9,185.

== History ==
A prototype of the robot was tested at the Caspian sea August 2013. Different aspects of the robot were successfully tested in a seven-day period. The efficiency of the robot was better when a competition was made between the robot and a lifeguard, in which the robot delivered a life tube to a victim who was 75 meters from the beach in 22 seconds, while the lifeguard took 90 seconds to reach the victim.

First real-life use will be in Brazil, Italy and Mexico in April 2015.
