= IAIO Owj =

Iranian advanced turbojet engine

Owj Turbojet Engine
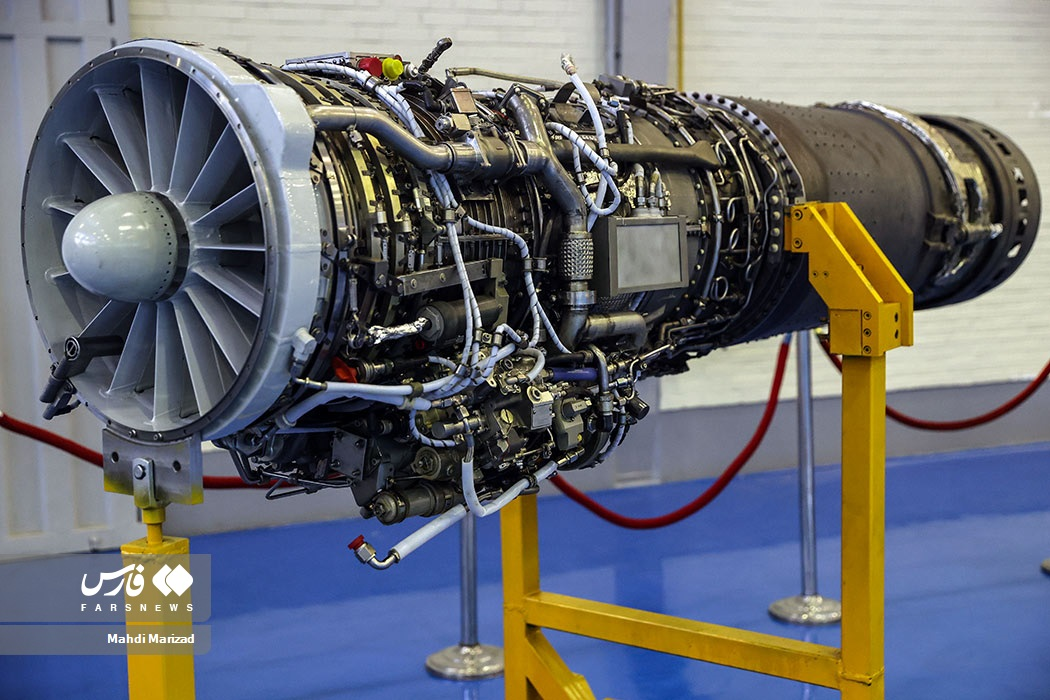
- The Iranian Owj Turbojet Engine
- Type: Turbojet
- National origin: Iran
- Manufacturer: General Electric, Iran Aviation Industries Organization, Turbine Engine Manufacturing (TEM)
- First run: 2016
- Major applications: HESA Kowsar, HESA Saeqeh

The Owj (Persian: اوج, Apex) is an Iranian turbojet engine that is reportedly a reverse-engineered copy of the General Electric J85. Revealed in 2016, the engine powers several military aircraft, including the HESA Kowsar and HESA Saeqeh fighter jets, as part of Iran's strategy to increase self-reliance in defense technologies.

== Design and development ==
The Owj turbojet is reportedly a reverse-engineered copy of the General Electric J85, a compact and widely used engine in military applications. Iranian engineers adapted the design to meet specific operational requirements and further enhance its performance for domestic use.

The engine is designed to provide significant thrust in a lightweight, compact structure. Its versatility allows it to power various aircraft, such as fighter jets and training jets.

== Iranian domestic aerospace effort ==
According to Iranian state media sources, the Owj engine reportedly powers the HESA Kowsar and HESA Saeqeh fighter jets.

== Applications ==
- HESA Kowsar (fighter jet)
- HESA Saeqeh (fighter jet)
- HESA Azarakhsh (fighter jet)
- HESA Yasin (training jet)

== See also ==
- TEM Toloue-4
- Iran Aviation Industries Organization
- Iranian defense industry
