= Owj Tazarve =

Iranian training aircraft

Tazarve
- Tazarve

General information
- Type: Training aircraft
- Manufacturer: Owj Industrial Complex
- Status: Canceled
- Primary users: Iran Islamic Republic of Iran Air Force

History
- Introduction date: 2002
- First flight: 1995 (Dorna)

(Ya Hossein) Tazarve (Persian: تذرو, "Pheasant") is an Iranian-made jet training aircraft, first revealed during Iran airshow 2002, in Kish.

Iran began a programme to develop a jet trainer in the early 1990s, known as the Ya-Hossein project, first flying a proof of concept aircraft, the Dorna (Lark) in 1995, a second, much modified aircraft, the Tondar (Thunder) flying in 1998, with a third aircraft, the Tazarve introducing further revisions. This third prototype was publicly unveiled at the Iran Kish Air Show in October–November 2002.

The Tazarve is a small aircraft of all composite (carbon fibre and glass-reinforced plastic construction, with a mid-mounted straight wing). It is powered by a single General Electric J85 jet engine, procured from existing Islamic Republic of Iran Air Force stocks. An order for five development examples and 25 production aircraft was placed by the Iranian air Force. At least the pre-production aircraft appear to have been built by 2008. After a deadly incident during a military parade in 2007 including the three prototoypes, the entire Ya-Hossein project was canceled and the remaining two aircraft retired and stored at Mehrabad International Airport. The aircraft seem to be stripped down of all valuable parts and only demonstrated again as ground exhibits in 2015.

== Specifications ==
Data from Ya Hossein Tazarve

General characteristics

- Crew: 2
- Length: 10.7 m (35 ft 1 in)
- Wingspan: 8.04 m (26 ft 5 in)
- Height: 3.63 m (11 ft 11 in)
- Empty weight: 2,550 kg (5,622 lb)
- Max takeoff weight: 4,000 kg (8,818 lb)
- Powerplant: 1 × General Electric J85-17 , 12.7 kN (2,900 lbf) thrust

Performance

- Maximum speed: 648 km/h (403 mph, 350 kn)
- Stall speed: 158 km/h (98 mph, 85 kn)
- Range: 750 km (470 mi, 400 nmi)
- Service ceiling: 11,582 m (37,999 ft)

== See also ==
- Iran Aviation Industries Organization
- Islamic Republic of Iran Armed Forces
- Islamic Republic of Iran Air Force
- List of aircraft of the Iranian Air Force
- Defense industry of Iran
- List of equipment of the Iranian Army
