= Iran Aircraft Manufacturing Industries Corporation =

Iranian aircraft company

Iran Aircraft Manufacturing Industrial Company شرکت صنایع هواپیماسازی ایران
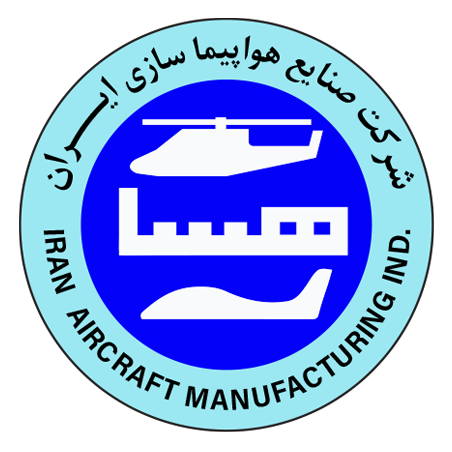
- Type: Aerospace manufacturer Government-owned corporation
- Industry: Aerospace
- Founded: 1977
- Headquarters: Isfahan province, Iran
- Key people: Gen. Hojjatulah Qureshi (Chairman)
- Products: Commercial airliners, civil & military aircraft, civil aviation
- Parent: Iran Aviation Industries Organization
- Website: www.hesa.ir

Iran Aircraft Manufacturing Industrial Company (HESA), (Persian: شرکت صنایع هواپیماسازی ایران – هسا) or Iran Aircraft Manufacturing Industries Corporation, is an Iranian aircraft production company. Established in 1976, it belongs to the Iran Aviation Industries Organization (IAIO) and is located at Shahin Shahr, Isfahan province. The company has thousands of square meters of available grounds, and 250,000 square metres of shops and hangars are allocated to A/C part manufacturing, assembling, laboratories, flight test facilities and shops of preparation for production.

The original factory, built by the US Textron company, was to produce Bell 214s of different configurations in Iran with a deal that involved several hundred helicopters and technology transfers. Reportedly, the contract was so large that a new Textron division had to be founded to meet Iranian demands and handle the program with Delk M. Oden as president. The work ended due to the Iranian Revolution and subsequent sanctions against Iran.

HESA has been subject to American sanctions since 2008. The Council of the European Union sanctioned it on 26 July 2010, and HM Treasury on 27 July 2010. On 30 January 2023, the European Union imposed additional sanctions on HESA for providing Russia with UAVs used in the 2022 Russian invasion of Ukraine.

== Names ==
Originally it was Helicopter-sāzi-e Irān شرکت صنعت هلیکوپترسازی ایران,

The company is also known as:

- HESA
- HESA Trade Center
- HTC
- IAMCO
- IAMI
- Iran Aircraft Manufacturing Company
- Iran Aircraft Manufacturing Industries
- Karkhanejate Sanaye Havapaymaie Iran
- Hava Peyma Sazi-e Iran
- Havapeyma Sazhran
- Havapeyma Sazi Iran
- Hevapeimasazi

== Subsidiaries ==
- Company for Designing and Manufacturing Light Aircraft (high-tech drones).

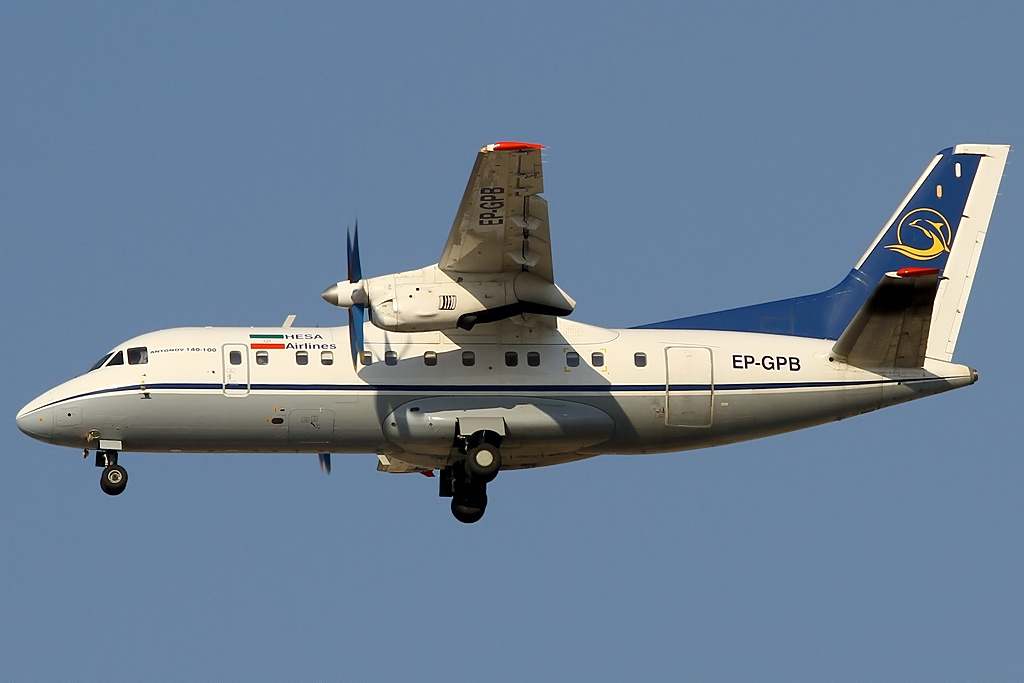
HESA manufactured and flown IrAn-140-100

== Products ==
=== Jet-propelled aircraft ===
- HESA Kowsar – a domestic "4th generation" version of reverse-engineered F-5 Tiger.
- Azarakhsh fighter jet (based on Northrop F-5)
- Saeqeh fighter jet (based on Northrop F-5)
- Simorgh: The Simorgh (هواپيماي سيمرغ) is a HESA-built two-seat Northrop F-5A to F-5B conversion. It was first flown in Iran Kish Air Show 2005, and two have been built.
- Qaher313
- Yasin
- Dorna/Tondar/Tazarve training aircraft
- Shafaq Light Trainer/Light Attack/Light Fighter (based on M-ATF)

=== Propeller aircraft ===
- IrAn-140 passenger plane with Ukrainian cooperation and based on Antonov An-140.
- HESA Simourgh Transport plane based on IrAn-140/An-140.

=== Miscellaneous ===
- Designing and manufacturing parachute recovery system for Ababil drone.
- Propeller with composite materials
- Manufacturing parts

=== Rotorcraft ===
- Shahed 278 helicopter (using components from Bell 206 and Panha Shabaviz 2061)
- Zafar 300 helicopter (based on Bell 206)
- Shahed 274 helicopter (based on Bell 206)
- Shahed 285 helicopter (using components from Bell 206 and Panha Shabaviz 2061)

=== Hovercraft ===
- Hovercraft repairs likely for Islamic Republic of Iran Navy

=== UAV ===
- Karrar (UCAV)
- Shahed 131
- Shahed 136 loitering munition
- Sofreh Mahi
- Shahed 129
- Shahed 149 Gaza
- Shahed 171 Simorgh
- Shahed Saegheh
- IAIO Fotros
- HESA Ababil

== See also ==
- Iran Electronic Industries
- Iran Aviation Industries Organization
- Islamic Republic of Iran Armed Forces
- Islamic Republic of Iran Air Force
- List of aircraft of the Iranian Air Force
- Defense industry of Iran
- List of equipment of the Iranian Army
