= List of aircraft of the Islamic Revolutionary Guard Corps Aerospace Force =

This is a list of aircraft of the Islamic Revolutionary Guard Corps Aerospace Force.

== Fixed-wing aircraft ==
| Aircraft | Picture | Type | In service | Notes |
Combat aircraft
| Sukhoi Su-22 | | Fighter-bomber | 9 | The Iranian Air Force received 40 Su-20/22s from Iraq in 1991. While non-operational for several years, in 2013 Iran started overhauling them. In March 2015, 10 of the Iranian Air Force Su-22 were transferred to the Syrian Arab Air Force to fight in the Civil War. In July 2018, ten overhauled and modernized Su-22 fighter jets were unveiled. Iranian military technical experts successfully overhauled and modernized 10 Su-22s, giving them the ability to carry smart bombs, fire precision-guided munitions, transfer data from UAVs and in the near future the necessary systems to use air-launched cruise missiles with a range of 1,500 km. Combat Aircraft Monthly quoted a spokesman for Iranian Aviation Industries stating "the PARS and IACI companies have been able to overhaul some 15 Su-22s, including two that were returned to Iraq". Three more were planned for overhaul as of February 2019. The 2020 edition of The Military Balance published by the IISS wrote that up to seven Su-22M4 Fitter K, and at least three Su22UM-3K Fitter G were operational. |
Transport aircraft
| Antonov An-74TK-200 | | Tactical airlift | 5 | |
| Harbin Y-12-II | | Transport | 11 | |
| Dassault Falcon 20F | | Utility transport | 1 | |
Trainer aircraft
| Embraer EMB 312 Tucano | | Trainer; Light attack | 15 | |
| PAC MFI-17 Mushshak | | Primary Trainer | 25 | Manufactured by the Pakistan Aeronautical Complex (PAC) at Kamra, Pakistan. Delivered between 1988 and 1991 to the IRIAF. |

== Helicopters ==
| Aircraft | Picture | Type | In service | Notes |
|---|---|---|---|---|
| Mil Mi-28NE | | Attack helicopter | Unknown | The deal to acquire an unspecified number of Mil Mi-28 helicopters by Iran was first announced in November 2023. A defense reporter for Iranian state-controlled Tasnim news agency reported arrival of Mil Mi-28NE attack helicopters in January 2026. |
| Toufan II | | Attack helicopter | Unknown | Domestically-built. |
| HESA Shahed 285 | | Attack Helicopter | Unknown | Domestically-built. In September 2019, one helicopter was delivered. |
| HESA Shahed 278 | | Light utility helicopter | Unknown | Domestically-built. In September 2019, three were delivered. |
| HESA Shahed 274 | | Light utility helicopter | Unknown | Domestically-built. In September 1999, the first was delivered. In 2002, three were in service. A total of 20, 30 according to some sources, were planned by the end of 2004. Status unknown as of 2006. |
| Mil Mi-17 | | Transport helicopter | 17 | |

== Unmanned aerial vehicles ==
| Aircraft | Picture | Type | In Service | Notes |
|---|---|---|---|---|
| Ababil | | Reconnaissance, combat, anti-radar operations | Unknown | Domestically-built. |
| Mohajer I/II/III/VI | | Strategic reconnaissance | Unknown | Domestically-built. |
| Karrar | | Unmanned combat aerial vehicle | Unknown | Domestically-built. |
| Shahed 129 | | Unmanned combat aerial vehicle | Unknown | Domestically-built. |
| Yasir | | Unmanned aerial vehicle | Unknown | Domestically-built. |
| Saegheh | | Unmanned aerial vehicle | 7≥ | Domestically-built. Seven units were reportedly used in the Operation Strike of Muharram in 2018. |

== See also ==
- List of aircraft of the Iranian Air Force
- Islamic Republic of Iran Army Aviation
