= List of supersonic aircraft =

A supersonic aircraft is an aircraft which can exceed the speed of sound (Mach 1.0) in level flight.

| Type | Country | Class | Role | Date | Status | No. | Notes |
|---|---|---|---|---|---|---|---|
| Aeritalia F-104S | Italy | Turbojet | Fighter | 1966 | Production | 246 | Interceptor |
| AIDC F-CK-1 Ching-kuo | Taiwan | Turbofan | Fighter | 1989 | Production | 137 | |
| AIDC T-5 Brave Eagle | Taiwan | Turbofan | Trainer | 2020 | Production | 4 | |
| Atlas Cheetah | South Africa | Turbojet | Fighter | 1986 | Production | 60 | |
| Avro Canada CF-105 Arrow | Canada | Turbojet | Fighter | 1958 | Prototype | 5 | Interceptor |
| BAC 221 | United Kingdom | Turbojet | Experimental | 1964 | Prototype | 1 | Fairey Delta 2 adapted to test the ogival delta wing for Concorde |
| BAC TSR-2 | United Kingdom | Turbojet | Attack | 1964 | Prototype | 1 | Tactical Strike/Reconnaissance (TSR) |
| Bell X-1 | United States | Rocket | Experimental | 1947 | Prototype | 7 | First supersonic aircraft |
| Bell X-2 | United States | Rocket | Experimental | 1952 | Prototype | 2 | |
| Boeing X-32 | United States | V/STOL | Experimental | 2000 | Prototype | 2 | |
| Boeing F/A-18E/F Super Hornet | United States | Turbofan | Multirole | 1995 | Production | 608 | |
| Boeing EA-18G Growler | United States | Turbofan | Patrol | 2004 | Production | 172 | Electronic warfare (EW) |
| Boom XB-1 | United States | Turbojet | Experimental | 2025 | Prototype | 1 | First human-piloted civil supersonic flight since the Concorde |
| Bristol 188 | United Kingdom | Turbojet | Experimental | 1962 | Prototype | 2 | |
| British Aerospace EAP | United Kingdom | Turbofan | Experimental | 1986 | Prototype | 1 | Developed into the Eurofighter Typhoon |
| CAC/PAC JF-17 Thunder | Pakistan/China | Turbofan | Multirole | 2003 | Production | 164 | |
| Chengdu J-7 | China | Turbojet | Fighter | 1966 | Production | 2400 | |
| Chengdu J-10 | China | Turbofan | Multirole | 1998 | Production | 548 | |
| Chengdu J-20 | China | Turbofan | Fighter | 2011 | Production | 50 | |
| Concorde | Multi-National | Turbojet | Transport | 1969 | Production | 20 | SST. Anglo-French |
| Convair B-58 Hustler | United States | Turbojet | Bomber | 1956 | Production | 116 | Strategic. |
| Convair F-102 Delta Dagger | United States | Turbojet | Fighter | 1953 | Production | 992 | Interceptor |
| Convair F2Y Sea Dart | United States | Turbojet | Fighter | 1953 | Prototype | 5 | Seaplane. Interceptor |
| Convair F-106 Delta Dart | United States | Turbojet | Fighter | 1959 | Production | 340 | Interceptor |
| Dassault MD.550 Mirage | France | Turbojet | Fighter | 1956 | Prototype | 1 | Interceptor |
| Dassault Mirage III | France | Turbojet | Fighter | 1958 | Production | 1422 | Interceptor. Active only in Pakistan Air Force |
| Dassault Mirage IIIV | France | V/STOL | Fighter | 1965 | Prototype | 2 | |
| Dassault Mirage IV | France | Turbojet | Bomber | 1959 | Production | 66 | Strategic nuclear. |
| Dassault Mirage 5 | France | Turbojet | Attack | 1967 | Production | 582 | |
| Dassault Mirage F1 | France | Turbojet | Fighter | 1966 | Production | 720 | |
| Dassault Mirage F2 | France | Turbofan | Attack | 1966 | Prototype | 1 | |
| Dassault Mirage G | France | Turbojet | Multirole | 1967 | Prototype | 3 | |
| Dassault Mirage 2000 | France | Turbofan | Fighter | 1978 | Production | 601 | |
| Dassault Mirage 4000 | France | Turbofan | Fighter | 1979 | Prototype | 1 | |
| Dassault Rafale | France | Turbofan | Multirole | 1986 | Production | 240 | |
| Dassault Super Mystère | France | Turbojet | Multirole | 1955 | Production | 180 | |
| Dawn Aerospace Mk-II Aurora | New Zealand/Netherlands | Rocket | Experimental | 2024 | Prototype | 1 | First supersonic civil aircraft since the Concorde |
| Douglas D-558-2 Skyrocket | United States | Rocket | Experimental | 1948 | Prototype | 3 | Dual jet and rocket powerplants, |
| Douglas X-3 Stiletto | United States | Turbojet | Experimental | 1951 | Prototype | 1 | |
| English Electric Lightning | United Kingdom | Turbojet | Fighter | 1957 | Production | 337 | Interceptor |
| Eurofighter Typhoon | Multi-National | Turbofan | Fighter | 1994 | Production | 661 | |
| EWR VJ 101 | West Germany | V/STOL | Fighter | 1963 | Prototype | 2 | |
| Fairey Delta 2 | United Kingdom | Turbojet | Experimental | 1954 | Prototype | 2 | First aircraft to pass 1,000 mph. |
| General Dynamics F-16 Fighting Falcon | United States | Turbofan | Fighter | 1974 | Production | 4604 | |
| General Dynamics F-111 Aardvark | United States | Turbofan | Fighter | 1964 | Production | 563 | Also bomber and EW Variants. |
| Grumman F-11 Tiger | United States | Turbojet | Fighter | 1954 | Production | 200 | |
| Grumman F11F-1F Super Tiger | United States | Turbojet | Fighter | 1956 | Prototype | 2 | |
| Grumman F-14 Tomcat | United States | Turbofan | Fighter | 1970 | Production | 712 | |
| Guizhou JL-9 | China | Turbojet | Trainer | 2003 | Production | | |
| HAL Tejas | India | Turbofan | Multirole | 2001 | Production | 40 | |
| Helwan HA-300 | Egypt | Turbojet | Fighter | 1964 | Prototype | 3 | Interceptor |
| HESA Azarakhsh | Iran | Turbojet | Fighter | 1997 | Prototype | 6 | |
| HESA Saeqeh | Iran | Turbojet | Fighter | 2004 | Production | 12 | |
| Hongdu L-15 | China | Turbofan | Trainer | 2005 | Prototype | | |
| IAI Kfir | Israel | Turbojet | Multirole | 1973 | Production | 220 | |
| IAI Lavi | Israel | Turbofan | Multirole | 1986 | Prototype | 3 | |
| IAI Nammer | Israel | Turbofan | Fighter | 1991 | Prototype | 1 | |
| IAI Nesher | Israel | Turbojet | Multirole | 1971 | Production | 61 | |
| KAI T-50 Golden Eagle | Republic of Korea | Turbofan | Trainer | 2002 | Production | 200 | |
| Lockheed A-12 | United States | Turbojet | Patrol | 1962 | Production | 15 | Hybrid turbojet-ramjet engines. Reconnaissance |
| Lockheed SR-71 Blackbird | United States | Turbojet | Patrol | 1964 | Production | 32 | Hybrid turbojet-ramjet engines. Reconnaissance |
| Lockheed YF-12 | United States | Turbojet | Fighter | 1963 | Prototype | 3 | Interceptor |
| Lockheed Martin F-22 Raptor | United States | Turbofan | Fighter | 1997 | Production | 195 | |
| Lockheed Martin F-35 Lightning II | United States | Turbofan | Multirole | 2006 | Production | 820 | |
| Lockheed F-104 Starfighter | United States | Turbojet | Fighter | 1954 | Production | 2578 | Interceptor |
| Lockheed Martin X-35 | United States | Turbofan | Experimental | 2000 | Prototype | 2 | |
| Martin Marietta X-24A | United States | Rocket | Experimental | 1969 | Prototype | 1 | |
| McDonnell F-101 Voodoo | United States | Turbojet | Fighter | 1954 | Production | 807 | |
| McDonnell Douglas F-4 Phantom II | United States | Turbojet | Multirole | 1958 | Production | 5195 | |
| McDonnell Douglas F-15 Eagle | United States | Turbofan | Fighter | 1972 | Production | 1723 | F-15E Strike Eagle multirole variant |
| McDonnell Douglas F/A-18 Hornet | United States | Turbofan | Multirole | 1978 | Production | 1480 | |
| Mikoyan-Gurevich MiG-19 | Soviet Union | Turbojet | Fighter | 1953 | Production | 2172 | |
| Mikoyan-Gurevich MiG-21 | Soviet Union | Turbojet | Fighter | 1955 | Production | 11496 | |
| Mikoyan-Gurevich MiG-23 | Soviet Union | Turbojet | Fighter | 1967 | Production | 5047 | |
| Mikoyan-Gurevich MiG-25 | Soviet Union | Turbojet | Fighter | 1964 | Production | 1186 | Interceptor |
| Mikoyan MiG-27 | Soviet Union | Turbojet | Attack | 1970 | Production | 1075 | |
| Mikoyan-Gurevich MiG-29 | Soviet Union | Turbofan | Fighter | 1977 | Production | 1600 | |
| Mikoyan MiG-31 | Soviet Union | Turbofan | Fighter | 1975 | Production | 519 | Interceptor |
| Mikoyan MiG-35 | Russia | Turbofan | Fighter | 2007 | Prototype | 8 | |
| Mikoyan Project 1.44 | Russia | Turbofan | Experimental | 2000 | Prototype | 1 | |
| Mitsubishi F-1 | Japan | Turbofan | Fighter | 1971 | Production | 77 | |
| Mitsubishi F-2 | Japan | Turbofan | Multirole | 1995 | Production | 98 | |
| Mitsubishi T-2 | Japan | Turbofan | Trainer | 1975 | Production | 90 | |
| Mitsubishi X-2 Shinshin | Japan | Turbofan | Experimental | 2016 | Prototype | 1 | |
| Myasishchev M-50 | Soviet Union | Turbojet | Bomber | 1959 | Prototype | 1 | |
| Nanchang J-12 | China | Turbojet | Fighter | 1970 | Prototype | 8 | |
| Nanchang Q-5 | China | Turbojet | Attack | 1965 | Production | 1300 | |
| Nord Gerfaut | France | Turbojet | Experimental | 1953 | Prototype | 2 | |
| Nord Griffon | France | Turbojet | Experimental | 1955 | Prototype | 2 | Dual turbojet-ramjet powerplant |
| North American A-5 Vigilante | United States | Turbojet | Bomber | 1958 | Production | 120 | Bomber, Reconnaissance |
| North American F-100 Super Sabre | United States | Turbojet | Fighter | 1953 | Production | 2294 | |
| North American F-107 | United States | Turbojet | Attack | 1957 | Prototype | 3 | |
| North American X-15 | United States | Rocket | Experimental | 1959 | Prototype | 3 | |
| North American XB-70 Valkyrie | United States | Turbojet | Bomber | 1964 | Prototype | 2 | Strategic bomber |
| Northrop F-5 | United States | Turbojet | Fighter | 1959 | Production | 2603 | |
| Northrop T-38 Talon | United States | Turbojet | Trainer | 1959 | Production | 1189 | |
| Northrop HL-10 | United States | Rocket | Experimental | 1966 | Prototype | 1 | |
| Northrop M2-F3 | United States | Rocket | Experimental | 1970 | Prototype | 1 | |
| Northrop YF-17 | United States | Turbojet | Fighter | 1974 | Prototype | 2 | |
| Northrop F-20 Tigershark | United States | Turbofan | Fighter | 1982 | Prototype | 3 | |
| Northrop YF-23 | United States | Turbofan | Fighter | 1990 | Prototype | 2 | |
| Panavia Tornado | Multi-National | Turbofan | Multirole | 1974 | Production | 992 | |
| Republic XF-91 Thunderceptor | United States | Turbojet | Fighter | 1949 | Prototype | 2 | Interceptor |
| Republic F-105 Thunderchief | United States | Turbojet | Attack | 1955 | Production | 833 | |
| Rockwell B-1 Lancer | United States | Turbofan | Bomber | 1974 | Production | 104 | Strategic bomber |
| Rockwell-MBB X-31 | United States | Turbofan | Experimental | 1990 | Prototype | 2 | |
| Saab 35 Draken | Sweden | Turbojet | Fighter | 1955 | Production | 651 | |
| Saab 37 Viggen | Sweden | Turbofan | Fighter | 1967 | Production | 329 | |
| Saab JAS 39 Gripen | Sweden | Turbofan | Multirole | 1988 | Production | 271 | |
| Saunders-Roe SR.53 | United Kingdom | Rocket | Fighter | 1957 | Prototype | 2 | Interceptor. Mixed powerplant (jet + rocket) |
| SEPECAT Jaguar | Multi-National | Turbofan | Attack | 1968 | Production | 543 | |
| Shenyang J-6 | China | Turbojet | Fighter | 1958 | Production | 4500 | |
| Shenyang J-8 | China | Turbojet | Fighter | 1969 | Production | 408 | Interceptor |
| Shenyang J-11 | China | Turbofan | Fighter | 1998 | Production | 440 | |
| Shenyang J-15 | China | Turbofan | Fighter | 2009 | Production | 50 | |
| Shenyang J-16 | China | Turbofan | Multirole | 2012 | Production | 172 | |
| Shenyang J-31 | China | Turbofan | Multirole | 2012 | Prototype | | |
| Sukhoi Su-7 | Soviet Union | Turbojet | Fighter | 1955 | Production | 1847 | |
| Sukhoi Su-9 | Soviet Union | Turbojet | Fighter | 1956 | Production | 1150 | Interceptor |
| Sukhoi Su-11 | Soviet Union | Turbojet | Fighter | 1958 | Production | 108 | Interceptor |
| Sukhoi Su-15 | Soviet Union | Turbojet | Fighter | 1962 | Production | 1290 | Interceptor |
| Sukhoi Su-17 | Soviet Union | Turbojet | Attack | 1966 | Production | 2867 | |
| Sukhoi Su-24 | Soviet Union | Turbojet | Attack | 1967 | Production | 1400 | |
| Sukhoi Su-27 | Soviet Union | Turbofan | Fighter | 1977 | Production | 680 | |
| Sukhoi Su-30 | Soviet Union | Turbofan | Multirole | 1989 | Production | 630 | |
| Sukhoi Su-33 | Soviet Union | Turbofan | Fighter | 1987 | Production | 35 | |
| Sukhoi Su-34 | Soviet Union | Turbofan | Attack | 1990 | Production | 147 | |
| Sukhoi Su-35 | Russia | Turbofan | Multirole | 2008 | Production | 154 | |
| Sukhoi Su-37 | Russia | Turbofan | Fighter | 1996 | Prototype | 1 | |
| Sukhoi Su-47 | Russia | Turbofan | Fighter | 1997 | Prototype | 1 | |
| Sukhoi Su-57 | Russia | Turbofan | Fighter | 2010 | Prototype | 16 | |
| Sukhoi T-4 | Soviet Union | Turbojet | Bomber | 1972 | Prototype | 1 | Strategic bomber |
| Tupolev Tu-22 | Soviet Union | Turbojet | Bomber | 1959 | Production | 311 | Strategic bomber |
| Tupolev Tu-22M | Soviet Union | Turbofan | Bomber | 1969 | Production | 497 | Strategic bomber |
| Tupolev Tu-28 | Soviet Union | Turbojet | Fighter | 1961 | Production | 198 | Interceptor |
| Tupolev Tu-144 | Soviet Union | Turbojet | Transport | 1968 | Production | 16 | SST |
| Tupolev Tu-160 | Soviet Union | Turbofan | Bomber | 1981 | Production | 36 | Strategic bomber |
| Vought F-8 Crusader | United States | Turbojet | Fighter | 1955 | Production | 1219 | |
| Xian JH-7 | China | Turbofan | Multirole | 1988 | Production | 270 | |
| Yakovlev Yak-27 | Soviet Union | Turbojet | Patrol | 1960 | Production | 165 | Reconnaissance |
| Yakovlev Yak-28 | Soviet Union | Turbojet | Multirole | 1958 | Production | 1180 | |
| Yakovlev Yak-38 | Soviet Union | V/STOL | Fighter | 1971 | Production | 231 | |
| Yakovlev Yak-141 | Soviet Union | V/STOL | Fighter | 1987 | Prototype | 4 | |

== See also ==
- List of aircraft
- Supersonic aircraft
- Sound barrier
- Supersonic flight
- Compressible flow
- Hypersonic
