= HESA Shahed 278 =

Iranian utility helicopter

Shahed 278
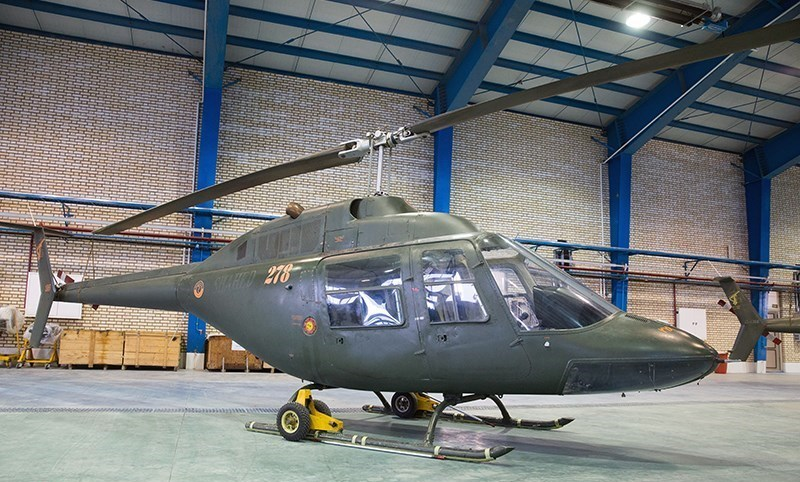

General information
- Type: Light utility helicopter
- Manufacturer: HESA
- Designer: Shahed Aviation Industries Research Center
- Status: Active service
- Primary user: Iran
- Number built: 7 visually confirmed as of 2012

History
- Introduction date: Iran
- First flight: 2002 or 2005
- Developed from: Bell 206 & Panha Shabaviz 2061

The HESA Shahed 278 (Persian: شاهد ۲۷۸) is an Iranian-made light utility helicopter.

Iran's Shahed Aviation Industries Research Center plans to produce several variants of Shahed, according to sources. The first platform was the Shahed-278 (Oh-78), described as a light reconnaissance helicopter, armed with weapons and sensors. Test flights of the Shahed-278 (Oh-78) began in 2005.

== Design ==
The composite Shahed-278 is a relatively light helicopter with 682 kg of empty weight. It is a four-seater; intended for dual military/civil use, though designed primarily to meet military requirements. It was designed entirely in Iran, according to the manufacturer, although some sources report use of locally made airframe and dynamic components of the Bell 206 JetRanger. Although designed by the IRGC, this helicopter is scheduled to be produced by HESA.

Shahed-278 has a four hours flight endurance and newer models can be equipped with MFD displays. The newer models are 11.82m long, 1.92m wide and 2.98m high. Body weight is increased to 750 kg. Maximum takeoff weight is 1450 kg, and maximum engine power is 420 hp. The OH-78 variation of Shahed-278 is armed with 70mm rockets with a range of 0.5–5 km. A 12.7 mm gun is installed under the nose. The helicopter is equipped with a night-and-day vision system and a data recording system can be added as an option. The OH-78 body is reinforced and the body shape is slightly different from the other versions.

== Specifications ==
General characteristics

- Crew: one
- Capacity: three passengers
- Empty weight: 682 kg (1,504 lb)
- Max takeoff weight: 1,451 kg (3,199 lb)
- Fuel capacity: 287 L (63 imp gal)
- Powerplant: 1 × Rolls-Royce 250 turboshaft

Performance

- Maximum speed: 240 km/h (150 mph, 130 kn)
- Range: 340 km (210 mi, 180 nmi)
- Service ceiling: 6,400 m (21,000 ft) *Hover ceiling in ground effect: 6,200 m (20,341 ft)
- Hover ceiling out of ground effect: 4,800 m (15,748 ft)

== See also ==
- Iran Aviation Industries Organization
- Islamic Republic of Iran Armed Forces
- List of Iranian Air Force aircraft
- List of equipment of the Iranian Army
- HESA Shafaq
- Aviation Industries of Iran AVA-202

Related development

- Bell 206
