= HESA Kowsar =

Iranian fighter aircraft

Kowsar
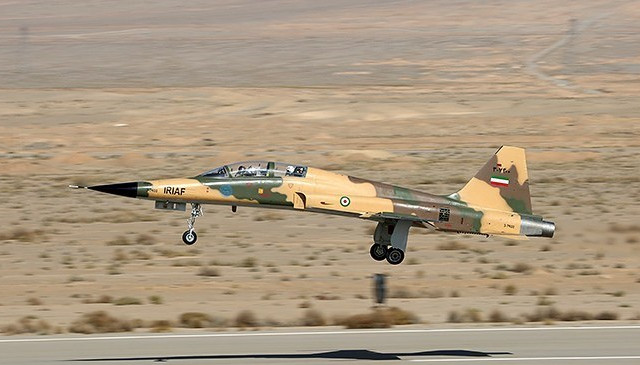
- HESA Kowsar

General information
- Type: Fighter, advanced fighter trainer
- Manufacturer: Iran Aircraft Manufacturing Industrial Company (HESA)
- Status: In service
- Primary user: Islamic Republic of Iran Air Force
- Number built: 4

History
- Introduction date: 3 November 2018
- First flight: August 2018
- Developed from: Northrop F-5; HESA Azarakhsh; HESA Saeqeh

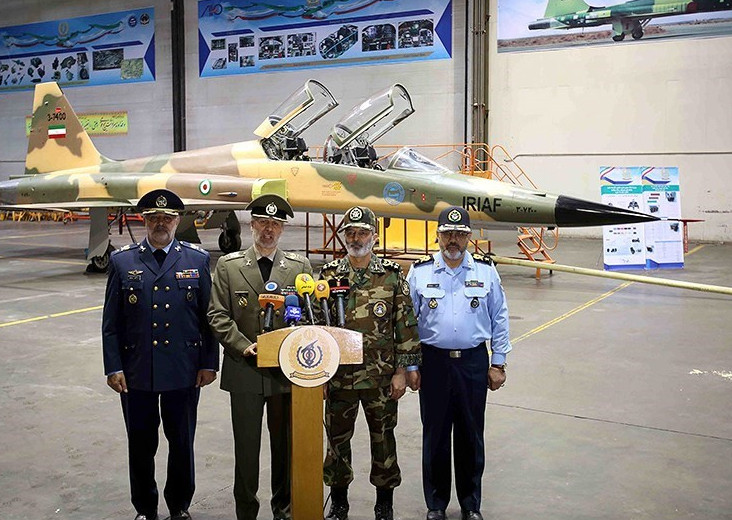
Unveiling the HESA Kowsar

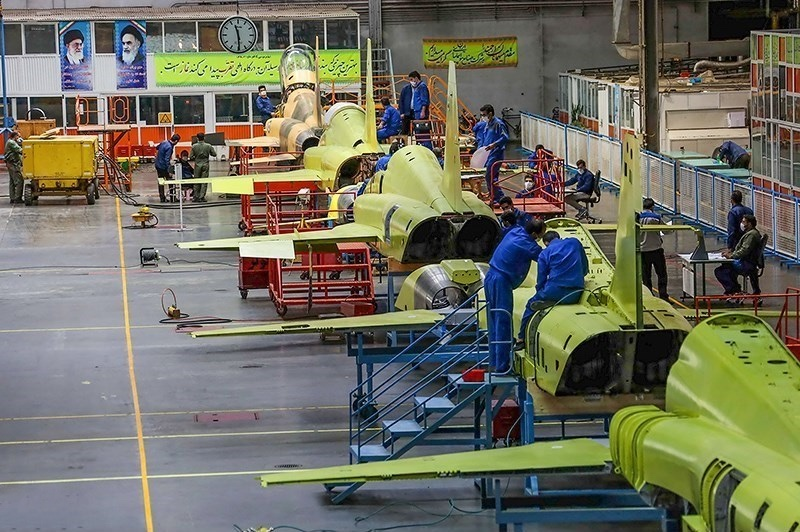
HESA Kowsar production line

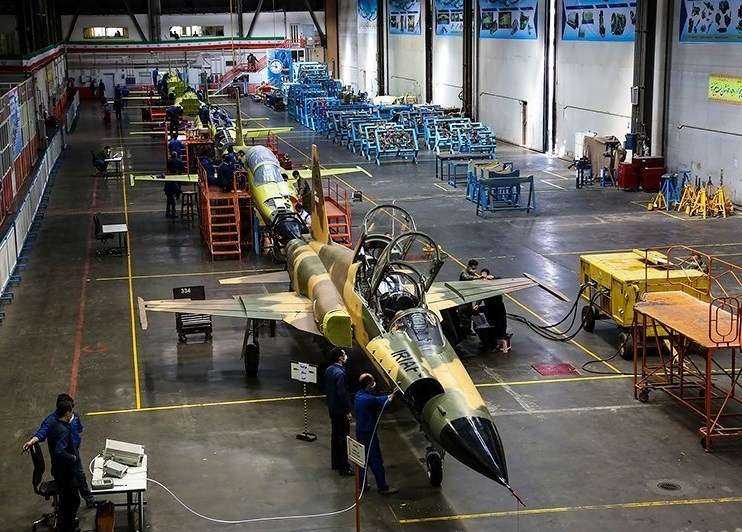
HESA Kowsar production line

The HESA Kowsar (Persian: کوثر, also spelt Kosar) is an Iranian fighter jet based on the American Northrop F-5. The aircraft is equipped with new fourth generation avionics in combination with an advanced fire control system.

== Development ==
On 3 November 2018, there was a ceremony that inaugurated the launch of the Kowsar assembly line at the Iran Aircraft Manufacturing Industries Company (HESA) with at least seven being made. President Hassan Rouhani was present as he inspected the Kowsar in the Defense Industry Day event celebration in Isfahan.

The HESA Kowsar has seven hardpoints with a total capacity of 3,200 kg (7,100 lb) of armaments and also has a 20 mm (0.79 in) cannon. It can carry up to four air-to-air Fatir missiles (a reverse engineering of Sidewinder missiles), or twelve 250 kg (550 lb) bombs or five 450 kg (990 lb) bombs or two 900 kg (2,000 lb) bombs. Kowsar has an Italian Grifo radar (a Chinese model or its domestic production has been used) with a range of 93 km (58 mi) that can engage two targets simultaneously.

Western media have described the plane to be inefficient as a weapon, but having potential for training a new generation of Iranian fighter pilots. There were reports of a crash by an Iranian-operated F-5 days after the Kowsar's existence was announced.

== Design ==
The Kowsar, like the Saegheh and the Azarakhsh, was made based on the frame of the American F-5.

According to Iranian media, this fighter jet has "advanced avionics" and multipurpose radar, and it was "100-percent indigenously made". It also uses digital data networks, a glass cockpit, heads-up display (HUD), ballistic computers and smart mobile mapping systems.

=== Variants ===
The Kowsar is produced in single and two-seater variants.

== Operational history ==
In September 2018, it was reported that the Kowsar was test-flown back on August 21, 2018. On 26 November 2018, Brigadier General Abdolkarim Banitarafi, head of Iran Aviation Industries Organization (IAIO), announced that Iran was ready to export the jet.

On 25 June 2020, the Iranian Ministry of Defence and Armed Forces Logistics announced that three new Kowsar aircraft had been delivered to the Islamic Republic of Iran Air Force, in a ceremony in Esfahan. The images published showed the aircraft painted in non-combat colours.

== Reactions ==
=== Official ===
Israel's defence minister Avigdor Liberman told press that it was a "natural reaction to an economic crisis", adding "[t]he Iranians are feeling very pressured by the continued US sanctions and in reaction they are coming out with these things, but we also shouldn’t dismiss it". Ofir Gendelman, spokesperson of the prime minister's office tweeted "The Iranian regime unveils the Kowsar plane and claims that it is ‘the first 100% locally-manufactured Iranian fighter jet'. It boasts about its offensive capabilities. But I immediately noticed that this is a very old American war plane (it was manufactured in the '50s). It is from the F-5 class of jets which has not been in use for decades".

=== Commentators ===
According to Douglas Barrie, military aerospace senior fellow at the IISS, the Iranians have possibly made upgrades and changes to the Kowsar while keeping the basic F-5 jet frame. He also suggests that while Iran can reverse engineer the jet frame, the problem lies in sourcing engines and avionics.

== Specifications ==
Data from

General characteristics

- Crew: 2
- Length: 14.45 m (47 ft 5 in)
- Wingspan: 8.13 m (26 ft 8 in)
- Height: 4.08 m (13 ft 5 in)
- Wing area: 17.28 m^{2} (186.0 sq ft)
- Empty weight: 4,349 kg (9,588 lb)
- Gross weight: 7,157 kg (15,778 lb)
- Max takeoff weight: 9,312 kg (20,529 lb)
- Powerplant: 2 × Owj turbojet engines, 15.5 kN (3,500 lbf) thrust each, 4,900 lbf (22 kN) in full afterburner.

Performance

- Maximum speed: 1,700 km/h (1,100 mph, 920 kn)
- Range: 1,100 km (680 mi, 590 nmi)
- Combat range: 2,000 km (1,200 mi, 1,100 nmi) (with external fuel tanks and 20 minutes reserved fuel)
- Ferry range: 2,900 km (1,800 mi, 1,600 nmi) (with 3 external fuel tanks)
- Service ceiling: 15,800 m (51,800 ft)
- Rate of climb: 175 m/s (34,400 ft/min)

== See also ==
- HESA Shafaq
- IAIO Qaher-313

Related development

- Northrop F-5
- HESA Azarakhsh
- HESA Saeqeh

Aircraft of comparable role, configuration, and era

- Northrop F-20 Tigershark

Related lists

- List of aircraft of the Iranian Air Force
