= HESA Yasin =

Iranian training aircraft

Yasin
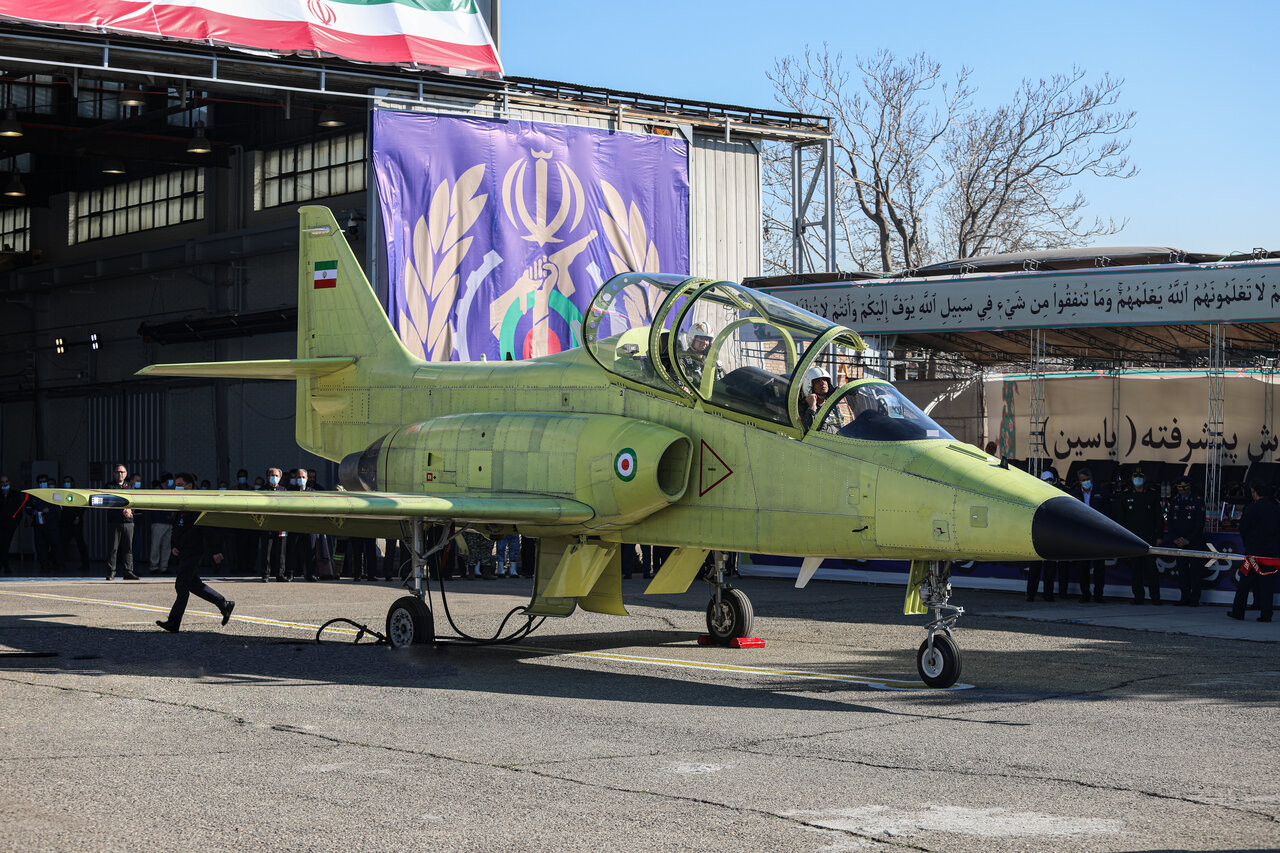
- HESA Yasin

General information
- Type: Military trainer aircraft / Jet trainer
- National origin: Iran
- Manufacturer: HESA
- Designer: Iran Aviation Industries Organization and Islamic Republic of Iran Air Force
- Status: In production
- Primary user: IRIAF
- Number built: 2

History
- Introduction date: 11 March 2023
- First flight: 2019

The HESA Yasin (Persian: یاسین) is an Iranian training jet unveiled on 17 October 2019. It is primarily designed for training fighter pilots, though it may also be used for close air support missions.

Developed by specialists within the Iranian Armed Forces, the Yasin is intended to enhance the training capabilities of Iran's air forces.

The aircraft is thought to be based on the Spanish CASA C-101 by some experts.

== History ==
The Yasin Trainer Jet is an Iranian-developed aircraft designed for military training purposes. On 1 December 2023, the final prototype of the Yasin successfully completed its first flight, marking a significant milestone in its development and the Iranian aerospace industry.

The initial version of the Yasin Trainer Jet was unveiled in 2019. On 20 March 2023, the new and production-standard prototype of the Yasin was unveiled, and its production line was officially launched. On 9 September 2023, the aircraft successfully completed its taxi test.

== Design ==
The weight of Yasin is 5.5 tons and can fly up to 1200 kilometers. The wing's design enables the jet to land and take-off at a speed of at least 200 km/h. The length of this aircraft is 12 meters and its height is 4 meters. Arming Yasin trainer jets for close air support is being considered.

== Crash incident ==
One of the two pre-production prototypes of the Yasin, which was scheduled to be displayed at the Kish Air Show in December 2024, crashed during a test flight on December 5, 2024. The crash occurred due to navigational issues and a collision with the Firouzabad Mountains. The two pilots on board, Colonel Hamidreza Ranjbar and Colonel Manouchehr Pirzadeh, died in the accident.

== Specifications ==
Data from

General characteristics

- Crew: 2
- Length: 12.25 m (40 ft 2 in)
- Wingspan: 10.4 m (34 ft 1 in)
- Height: 4 m (13 ft 1 in)
- Wing area: 24 m^{2} (260 sq ft)
- Empty weight: 3,900 kg (8,598 lb)
- Gross weight: 5,500 kg (12,125 lb)
- Max takeoff weight: 6,600 kg (14,551 lb)
- Powerplant: 2 × Owj turbojet engines (without afterburner version), 16 kN (3,600 lbf) thrust each

Performance

- Maximum speed: 1,000 km/h (620 mph, 540 kn)
- Stall speed: 200 km/h (120 mph, 110 kn)
- Range: 900 km (560 mi, 490 nmi)
- Ferry range: 1,200 km (750 mi, 650 nmi)
- Endurance: 90 minutes with internal fuel or 120 minutes with additional external fuel tanks
- Service ceiling: 11,000 m (36,000 ft)

== See also ==
Aircraft of comparable role, configuration, and era

- CASA C-101 Aviojet

Related lists

- List of aircraft of the Iranian Air Force
