= 2009 Ilyushin Il-76 crash =

2009 Ilyushin Il-76 crash may refer to one of several accidents involving Ilyushin Il-76 aircraft in 2009:

- 2009 Iranian Air Force Il-76MD Adnan 2 accident - the crash of an Iranian Air Force AWACS Il-76 on 22 September
- 2009 Makhachkala Il-76 collision - a collision in Russia on 15 January between a landing Il-76 of the MVD and another MVD Il-76 on the ground
- 2009 Yakutia Ilyushin Il-76 crash - the crash of a Russian MVD Il-76 on 1 November
- The crash of an Il-76 operated by South African airline Aerolift on 9 March
