= IAIO Qaher-313 =

Iranian stealth fighter program

Qaher-313
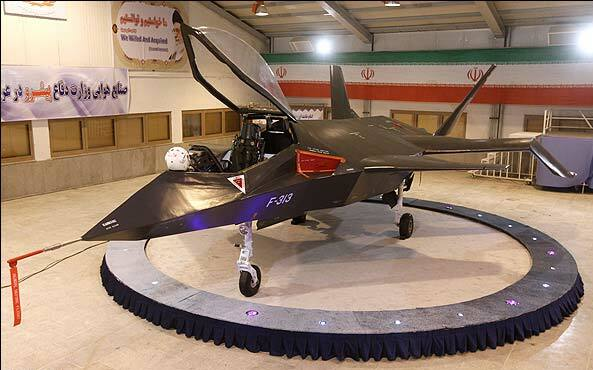
- Qaher-313 prior to being reworked as an unmanned aerial vehicle

General information
- Type: Prototype fighter
- National origin: Iran
- Manufacturer: HESA / SAHA
- Status: Reworked
- Number built: 3

The IAIO Qaher-313 (Persian: قاهر-۳۱۳; also Ghaher-313, Conqueror (Tamer)-313, Q-313, F-313) is an Iranian prototype aircraft. Originally intended to be a manned single-seat potential 5th generation aircraft and stealth fighter, the Qaher-313 was publicly announced on 1 February 2013. Independent experts have expressed significant doubts about the viability of the aircraft. In early 2023, Iranian media reported that the Qaher-313 was being modified from a manned fighter aircraft into an unmanned aerial vehicle.

== Design and development ==
=== Manned fighter aircraft ===
According to Iranian government sources, the F-313 Qaher was designed and is indigenously produced in Iran by the Iran Aviation Industries Organization (IAIO), a division of the Ministry of Defense, and IRIAF. The project manager is Hassan Parvaneh.

The aircraft design is a canard configuration. It was initially described as a stealth fighter built with advanced materials, a very low radar signature and with low-altitude operations capability that could carry either two 2,000-pound (910 kg) bombs, multiple smaller smart guided missiles, or at least 6 PL-12 type air-to-air missiles; these claims were later debunked by numerous international experts. It features a downward wingtip device. Iran claims they have designed the aircraft using CATIA three-dimensional interactive design software and tested it using simulation software including Gambit numerical grid generation software, fluent flow analysis and simulation software, CFD models and that they have additionally tested the aerodynamics using small sized jet and propeller flying models.

A prototype version of the Qaher-313 was portrayed to have test-flown at some point before the presentation. According to the head of the design team, two sub-sized models have been created and tested. One of the models uses a propeller engine while the other uses a small micro jet engine. The models were shown in a video clip (along with descriptions by the head of the design team) the same day. According to Haaretz, the "blurry video published by the Iranians purporting to show the Qaher 313 in flight seems to show not a manned fighter jet but a small radio-operated drone" which agrees with what the designers said about the videos at the Qaher-313 introduction ceremony.

On 10 February 2013, the Iranian Minister of Defense said the claims made by foreign media about the project are inaccurate and that the engine used by the design had been successfully tested. He also confirmed that the aircraft had not yet been flown, but that taxi and flight tests will occur in the near future.

On 5 March 2017, Iranian Defense Minister Brigadier General Hossein Dehghan stated that the Qaher-313 was ready for flight testing. It was described by the Fars News Agency as a "logistic aircraft for short distances" and a "light fighter jet used for military and training operations".

A subsequent third prototype, designated "08", introduced a number of changes over the models previously showcased, most notably an enlarged cockpit, dual jet exhausts, and a FLIR turret in the nose.

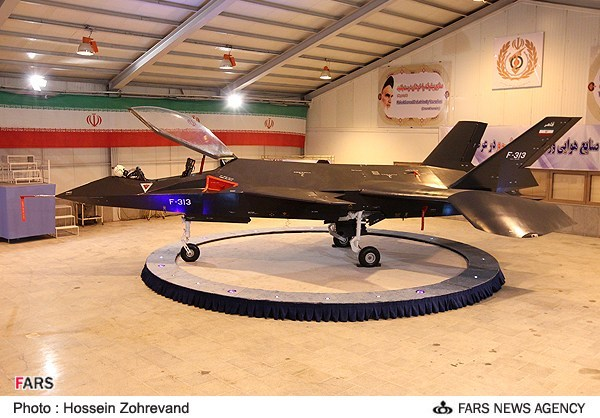
Unveiling ceremony of Qaher-313 fighter

=== Unmanned aerial vehicle ===
The managing director of the Iran Aviation Industries Organization (IAIO), a subsidiary of the Defense Ministry, announced in a televised interview on 18 February 2023 that the fighter had reached technical maturity but would be reworked and fielded as an unmanned drone rather than a manned aircraft to adapt it to the requirements of Iranian military units, first deliveries would be made in the middle of 2024. On February 6th 2025, the UAV variant of the Qaher-313 was revealed as the JAS 313, a naval drone with two versions, one that is 60% and one that is 20% the size of the original.

== Doubts of viability of aircraft ==
Four-view of Qaher-313

There has been no independent verification of the status of development of this aircraft and some commentators have even claimed that the aircraft is a hoax, or a "laughable fake". Media sources outside of Iran have raised the possibility that the demonstrated aircraft would not be able to meet stated performance and / or that it may be a scale prototype or mockup, with Cyrus Amini, a BBC News Persian Service journalist claiming that the aircraft "looks like a cheap copy of the American F22". Iran does not release technical details on its arsenals, so many of its claims about the aircraft are impossible to verify.

According to Flight Global, unnamed Israeli experts say the "indigenous fighter jet" Iran presented on 2 February is nothing more than a "very sleek plastic model". Further, the canopy appears to be constructed of "basic plastic," the air intakes are unusually small and "The whole impression is of some plastic parts pasted to an old flying platform". One expert says the cockpit and ejection seat seem real, but the Qaher-313 displayed seemed too small to be a capable fighter. A photo of the cockpit shows a simple glass cockpit design using civilian avionics from Dynon Avionics and Garmin, which are normally found on much less sophisticated general aviation aircraft. The markings on the backup airspeed indicator in this photo seem unrealistic, suggesting a stall speed in landing configuration of merely 70 knots (130 km/h; 81 mph) and a never exceed speed of about 260 knots (480 km/h; 300 mph); values more likely to be found on a small turboprop aircraft. Video footage showing the plane airborne could have been a radio-controlled model aircraft. Poor-quality footage posted on the internet provided no sense of scale for the platform being flown and also failed to show its take-off or landing. Its stealth claims have also been called into question, having no visible weapons carrying capability, either internally or externally.

Israeli aeronautics expert Tal Inbar claimed "It’s not a plane, because that’s not how a real plane looks. Iran doesn’t have the ability to build planes. Plain and simple." Military aviation journalist David Cenciotti stated that the aircraft has "implausible aerodynamics and Hollywood sheen", claimed that it is too small to be a real fighter jet and that the cockpit was too simple and was "similar to those equipping small private planes".

During the F-313’s first reported taxi test under its own power, analysts cited by Vice News noted that a tire pressure marking visible on the aircraft indicated a minimum pressure of approximately 50 PSI. The article compared this figure to older fighter aircraft such as the F-4 Phantom and F-14 Tomcat, which typically require tire pressures in the 200–300 PSI range. According to the analysis, this discrepancy raised doubts about the aircraft’s structural weight and whether it could accommodate the payload and systems claimed by Iranian officials. If the Qaher-313 can reliably roll on 50 PSI tires, it would have to weigh no more than one-fifth of the weight of the F-4 Phantom per unit of volume.

The Times of Israel labelled the aircraft "a hoax" and cited an Israeli aerospace engineer that the aircraft displayed was obviously not a flying example.

== See also ==
- Science and technology in Iran
- HESA Shafaq
