= HESA Shahed 274 =

Iranian utility helicopter

Shahed 274
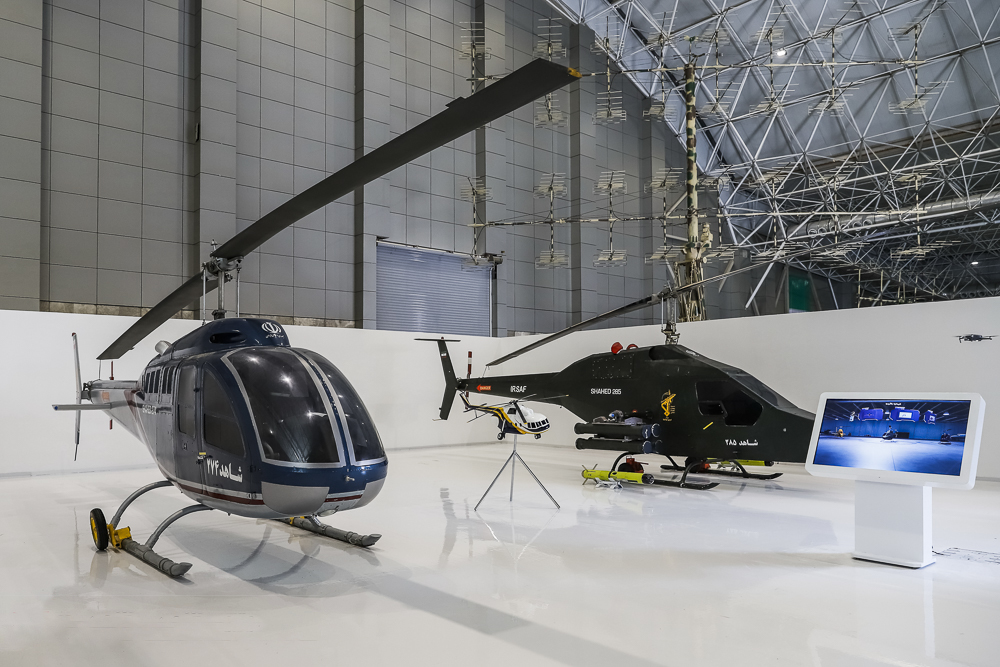
- Shahed 274 on left

General information
- Type: Light utility helicopter
- Manufacturer: Iran Aircraft Manufacturing Industrial Company
- Designer: Institute of Industrial Research and Development of the IRGC
- Status: Unknown
- Primary user: Islamic Revolutionary Guard Corps
- Number built: At least 3

History
- Introduction date: 30 December 2000
- First flight: 1997

Shahed 274 (Persian: شاهد ۲۷۴) is an Iranian-made light utility helicopter, reportedly developed by the Islamic Revolutionary Guard Corps.

== History ==
According to Jane's, the helicopter was known with the tentative name 'X-5' in the Institute of Industrial Research and Development of the Islamic Revolutionary Guard Corps, where it was developed during the 1990s. The aircraft made its first flight reportedly in 1997, and the first instance was delivered on 16 September 1999 (with the tail number 71-823). The public international debut of Shahed 274 was held on 30 December 2000, in Tehran. By the end of 2001, it is known that two more helicopters with tail number 74-001 and 74-002 were in service. From October to November 2002, the helicopters were put on display at Iran Kish Air Show. By the end of 2004, it was reported that 20 or 30 were planned, but no evidence of were available as of 2006, and status of the project was also unknown.

== Specifications ==
Data from Jane's All the World's Aircraft (2007–08)

General characteristics

- Capacity: 5 (including pilot)
- Length: 9 m (29 ft 6 in)
- Height: 3 m (9 ft 10 in)
- Empty weight: 1,000 kg (2,205 lb)
- Max takeoff weight: 1,500 kg (3,307 lb)
- Powerplant: 1 × Rolls-Royce 250-C20B Turboshaft, 313 kW (420 hp)
- Main rotor diameter: 10 m (32 ft 10 in)
- Propellers: 2-bladed main and tail

Performance

- Maximum speed: 180 km/h (112 mph, 97 kn)
- Range: 600 km (373 mi, 324 nmi)
- Service ceiling: 5,200 m (17,100 ft)
