= List of aircraft of the Iranian Air Force =

This is a list of aircraft types operated by the Iranian Air Force, not including those operated by the Aerospace Force of the Islamic Revolutionary Guard Corps. This list includes aircraft operated by Imperial Iranian Army Aviation prior to the foundation of the Air Force as a separate service in August 1955.

In 2007, Iraq asked Iran to return some of the scores of Iraqi fighter planes that flew there ahead of the Persian Gulf War in 1991. One former-Iraqi Ilyushin Il-76MD Adnan 2 crashed during a flyby near the city of Tehran. In late 2014, Iran returned some of the impounded Iraqi military aircraft to Iraq.

== Combat/Fighter Aircraft ==
=== Air superiority fighters ===
| Aircraft | Origin | Type | Versions | Number | Years | Notes |
|---|---|---|---|---|---|---|
| Mikoyan MiG-29 | Russia | Multirole-fighter Trainer | MiG-29 (9.12B) MiG-29UB | 29 | 1991 | 24 MiG-29s were delivered in 1990. Iran also took several ex-Iraqi MiG-29 aircraft flown over in 1991, including one MiG-29UB. The current number of MiG-29 in active service is unknown. According to Russian media up to 30 MiG-29s have been overhauled, 24 MiG-29 product 9.12B and 6 MiG-29UB 9.51, and can now be armed with Nasr-1 anti-ship missiles. |
| Grumman F-14 Tomcat | US | Multirole-fighter | F-14A | 32 | 1974–present | 80 examples ordered, 79 were originally delivered. The only plane to use the Phoenix missile. 40 in inventory as of 2014. In 2018, Iran had about 40 F-14s remaining, with two of them upgraded to F-14AM. On 16 June 2025, the Israel Defense Forces released video footage showing a pair of F-14s were destroyed in air strikes against Iran On 21 June 2025, the Israel Defense Forces released more video footage showing the destruction of three more F-14s. On 7 March 2026, Israeli strikes on an air base in Isfahan destroyed 8 more F-14s. |

=== Supplementary fighters ===
| Aircraft | Origin | Type | Versions | Number | Years | Notes |
|---|---|---|---|---|---|---|
| HESA Saeqeh | Iran | Light fighter | Saegheh-1/2 | 6 | 2006–present | Is claimed to be heavily upgraded and indigenously made |
| HESA Kowsar | Iran | Fighter aircraft | | 5 | 2018–present | Variant of the Northrop F-5. Western analysts have described the plane as inefficient as a weapon, but having potential for training a new generation of Iranian fighter pilots. According to Iranian state-media, this fighter jet has "advanced avionics" and multipurpose radar, and it was "100-percent indigenously made". It uses digital data networks, a glass cockpit, heads-up display (HUD), ballistic computers and smart mobile mapping systems. |
| HESA Azarakhsh | Iran | Light fighter | First Generation (includes twin-seat version) | 4 | 2015 | Rebuilt F-5E. |
| Chengdu J-7 | China | Fighter aircraft | N/MB | 12 | 1991–present | 3 of them crashed and was destroyed due to technical fault. 10 of them destroyed during the 2026 Iran War. |
| Mirage F1 | France | Fighter aircraft | F1EQ/F1BQ | 17 | 1991–present | Iran received 24 F1BQs and F1EQs flown over from Iraq, during the 1991 Persian Gulf War. One Mirage F1BQ from Mashhad AFB (TFB.14) was shot down in July 2001 by the Taliban with Sa-16/18 Manpad while involved in countering drug-smuggling at the Afghan border. As of 2026 12 Mirage F1EQ and 5 F1BQ aircraft remain in service. |
| McDonnell Douglas F-4 Phantom II | US | Interceptor | F-4D/E RF-4E | 60 | 1968–present | 225 ordered and delivered. In 2014, 60 F-4D/E and 4 RF-4Es remained. 10 are F-4Ds and 50 are F-4Es. F-4Ds/Es are currently undergoing an upgrade program which includes a new Chinese-built radar and other avionics and weapons, namely PL-5E, PL-11 and C-801. In October 2013, the anti-ship Qader cruise missile was successfully tested on an F-4. |
| Northrop F-5 Tiger II | US | Light fighter | F-5E F-5F | 48 | 1974–present | 181 ordered and delivered. In 2014, 60 F-5s remained. This included about 16 F-5F dual seat trainers and 44 F-5E fighter bomber. |

=== Ground attack ===
| Aircraft | Origin | Type | Versions | Number | Years | Notes |
|---|---|---|---|---|---|---|
| Sukhoi Su-24 | Russia | Strike/air-to-air refuelling "buddy" tanker | Su-24MK | 18 | 1991 | 12 aircraft supplied by Russia in 1991. 24 Iraqi aircraft were evacuated to Iran during the 1991 Gulf War and were put in service with the IRIAF. 3 of them crashed and were destroyed due to a technical fault. 30 Su-24MKs in service as of January 2013. Iran tested domestically produced, anti-radar smart missiles carried by Su-24 aircraft in September 2011. 2 were shot down by Qatari aircraft on 2 March 2026.An additional aircraft was destroyed at Ahvaz International Airport on 5 March 2026. Flight Global's World Air Forces 2026 finds that there are 21 Su-24MKs in service as of 2026. After recent war losses, 18 aircraft remain. |

== Reconnaissance, patrol, and Electronic Warfare ==
=== Maritime Patrol ===
| Aircraft | Origin | Type | Versions | Number | Years | Notes |
|---|---|---|---|---|---|---|
| Lockheed P-3 Orion | US | maritime patrol | P-3F | 2 | 1974–present | 2 in service |

=== Reconnaissance ===
| Aircraft | Origin | Type | Versions | Number | Years | Notes |
|---|---|---|---|---|---|---|
| McDonnell Douglas F-4 Phantom II | US | | RF-4E | 1 | 1968–present | Last RF-4E in active military service in the world. |

== Transport and utility ==
| Aircraft | Origin | Type | Versions | Number | Years | Notes |
|---|---|---|---|---|---|---|
| Ilyushin Il-76 | Russia | tactical airlift/transport | Il-76TD Il-76MD | 7 | | |
| Dassault Falcon 20 | France | VIP transport | 20F | 3 | | |
| Dassault Falcon 50 | France | VIP transport | | 1 | | |
| Fokker F27 Friendship | Netherlands | tactical airlift/transport and target towing | F27-400M F27-600 | 12 | 1972–present | |
| Pilatus PC-6 Porter | Switzerland | utility transport | | 15 | | |
| Boeing 707 | US | VIP transport transport air-to-air refuelling tanker | 707-368C 707-3J9C | 1 2 | 1974–present | 1 tanker, 2 transports. |
| Boeing 747 | US | VIP transport/freighter | 747-100 747-100F 747-200F | 6 | | 2 tanker, 4 transports. One is used for electronic warfare. |
| Lockheed C-130 Hercules | US | tactical airlift/transport | C-130E C-130H | 22 | | Nine visible on Google Maps at Mehrabad Air Base with underwing stores. Some do not appear to have all four engines installed. |
| Lockheed JetStar | US | VIP transport | JetStar 8 | 2 | | 1 operational in 2008 |

== Trainers ==
| Aircraft | Origin | Type | Versions | Number | Years | Notes |
|---|---|---|---|---|---|---|
| Yak-130 | Russia | trainer/CAS | | 7 | 2023 | The first batch of the Yak-130 trainers was delivered in September 2023. |
| Fajr F.3 | Iran | trainer | F.3 | 2 | | |
| HESA Dorna | Iran | Trainer | | 1 | 2016 | Prototype |
| IRIAF Parastu-14 | Iran | trainer | | 12 | | 12 in 2005. |
| HESA Yasin | Iran | Advanced Trainer | | 1+ | | The HESA Yasin, formerly known as Kowsar 88, is a light aircraft and advance training aircraft designed and manufactured by Iran Aircraft Manufacturing Company, at the request of the Air Force of the Islamic Republic of Iran. Yassin uses two 7,000-pound turbojet engines and is on par with the Russian MiG-AT jet. 1 crashed in 2024. |
| HESA Simorgh / Northrop F-5B | Iran | Advanced Trainer | | 9 | | F-5As converted domestically to F-5B standard. |
| Chengdu FT-7 | China | Advanced Trainer | FT-7N | 14 | | Dual-seat J-7 conversion trainer. In 2014, it was reported that 5 were in service. Scramble notes 14 active. |
| TB-21 Tobago / TB-200 Trinidad | France | trainer | | 12 | | 12 trainers in service. |
| PAC MFI-17 Mushshak | Pakistan | trainer | | 25 | | 25 trainers in service. |
| Pilatus PC-7 Turbo Trainer | Switzerland | trainer | | 45 | | |
| Beechcraft Bonanza | US | trainer | F33 | 28 | | |

== Helicopters ==
| Aircraft | Origin | Type | Variant | Number | Years | Notes |
|---|---|---|---|---|---|---|
| Agusta Bell 206 | Italy | Light utility/trainer | AB 206 | 20 | | Licence-built in Italy. |
| Agusta-Bell 212 | Italy | Utility | AB-212 | 1 | | Licence-built in Italy. 1 lost in May 2024. |
| Boeing CH-47 Chinook | US | Heavy-lift transport | CH-47C | 5 | | |

== Other types ==
These types were also purchased by the Iranian government

- One Aero A.30 from Czechoslovakia in 1923
- One De Havilland DHC-4 Caribou in 1979

A number of other types have been in recent, or reported to be in, Iranian service. Many remain in reserve storage or are operated by the Army or Navy. Some recent types include:

- Shabaviz 2-75, Iranian origin, operated by the Army
- HESA Shahed 278
- Shahed 285, 40+ operated by Iranian forces
- IAIO Toufan, 40+ operated by IRIAA
- Mikoyan MiG-21PFM, formerly IQAF
- Mikoyan MiG-23BN, formerly IQAF
- Sukhoi Su-25K, formerly IQAF
- Sukhoi Su-22M4, formerly IQAF
- Sukhoi Su-20, formerly IQAF
- Mi-17, 47 operated by the Iranian air force
- Shenyang F-6C
- Northrop F-5A Freedom Fighter
- North American F-86F Sabre
- Republic F-84G Thunderjet
- Lockheed T-33A T-Bird
- Boeing 727, Cargo/transport
- Hughes 300C

Iran has a number of UAVs and UCAVs, under operation of the Iranian Army Aviation.

== See also ==
- List of aircraft of the Islamic Revolutionary Guard Corps Aerospace Force
- List of equipment of the Islamic Republic of Iran Air Defense Force
