= HESA Dorna =

Iranian prototype training aircraft

Dorna

General information
- Type: Light Training
- Manufacturer: Iran Aircraft Manufacturing Industrial Company
- Primary users: Iran Islamic Republic of Iran Air Force
- Number built: 3+

History
- Introduction date: 2006

The HESA Dorna (Persian: Dornā, "Crane") is a jet-powered Iranian training aircraft. The aircraft was first publicised in 1999 when Iranian air force General Habibollah Baghal claimed that a locally designed Dorna trainer aircraft had entered production.

== See also ==
- Military of Iran
- Islamic Republic of Iran Air Force
- List of Iranian Air Force aircraft
- Iranian military industry
