= Iran Aviation Industries Organization =

Iranian defence company

Iran Aviation Industries Organization سازمان صنایع هوایی ایران
- Company type: Aerospace manufacturer Government-owned corporation
- Industry: Aerospace
- Founded: 1966
- Headquarters: Tehran, Iran
- Key people: Afshin Khajeh Fard (Head)
- Products: Commercial airliners, Civil & Military aircraft, Civil aviation
- Parent: Ministry of Defense; Iran Civil Aviation Organization
- Subsidiaries: Aviation & Aerospace Industries; SAHA; HESA; PANHA; Qods Aviation Industry
- Website: www.mod.ir

The Iran Aviation Industries Organization (IAIO) (Persian: سازمان صنایع هوایی ایران, Sazman-e Sânai'-ye Havaii-ye Iran), also known as the Aerospace Industries Organization, is an Iranian state-owned corporation established in 1966 for the purpose of planning, controlling, and managing the civil & military aviation industry of Iran. The Aerospace Industries Organization acts as both an OEM, directly manufacturing aircraft and aerospace products, and as a conglomerate, holding other Iranian state-owned aviation corporations.

Currently, the IAIO is responsible for directing these aviation organizations: SAHA, HESA, PANHA, Civil Aviation industries. These organizations have different and complementary roles in Iranian Aerospace and Iranian civil aviation.

The Iran Helicopter Support and Renewal Company (IHSRC), or PANHA, was formed in 1969, the Iranian Aircraft Industries (IACI) in 1970, and Iran Aircraft Manufacturing Industries Corporation (IAMI), also known under its Persian acronym HESA, in 1974. Two other important companies, Iran Aviation Industries Organization of the Armed Forces, (also known as the Iranian Armed Forces Aviation Industries Organization (IAFAIO)), and Qods Aviation Industry Company Research Center were formed in the early 1980s.

It is headquartered in the Lavizan suburb of Tehran and employs more than 10,000 people across 13 major factories. In addition to its aerospace work, IAIO is heavily involved in Iran's ballistic missile program.

== Overview ==
IAIO acts as a policy maker and coordinator to promote an indigenous Iranian aeronautical industry by providing and assisting the Iranian aircraft industries with technologies, knowledge and parts.

As evidenced by the inaugural flight of Iran's indigenously designed and manufactured Azarakhsh and Saeqeh fighter jet to the mass production and launch of helicopters, turboprops, and passenger planes. Iran has also produced a Boeing 737-800 simulator, a first in Mideast. With a population of 81 million, Iran needs to have 6,300 airplanes while it does not possess more than nine aircraft for every one million individuals.

== History ==
Iran's aviation industry infrastructure was by and large established in the 1930s, at the time of the Shah Reza Pahlavi, where the German Junkers & Co Aviation provided foreign expertise and assistance. The industry was later expanded in the 1970s in the reign of Shah Mohammad Reza Pahlavi, benefiting from the boosted oil revenues. Not only did the Shah order vast quantities of America’s most advanced weapons, he was also acquiring the capability to produce them in Iran. Under a multibillion-dollar industrialisation programme, the Shah commissioned US arms firms to build weapons factories in Iran.

Thus Bell Helicopter (a division of Textron, Inc.) was building a factory to produce Model-214 helicopters in Isfahan. Northrop Corporation was also a joint partner in Iran Aircraft Industries, inc., which maintained many of the US military aircraft sold to Iran and was expected to produce aircraft components and eventually complete planes. These efforts represented a large share of US industrial involvement in Iran, and were a centrepiece of the Shah’s efforts to develop modern, high-technology industries.

After international sanctions following the Iranian Revolution, the general official policy of Iranian government changed from having the best available in the world to being able to manufacture independently in order to meet domestic needs, specially of technological products and therefore becoming "sanction-proof".

In no other field this urgency was higher than aeronautics. Therefore, Iran has avoided the need to purchase better western aircraft available to it from time to time in favor of inferior ones that could be manufactured in Iran through arrangements of purchasing licenses and technologies as well as reverse-engineering parts, mostly to avoid situations that Iran has gone through during the 1980s till now by not being able to maintain what it had due to domestic technological starvation.

In 2006 Textron sued IAIO, for producing counterfeits of six types of its Bell unit helicopters without licenses thereby using trade secrets and patented designs without permission and demanded compensation for damages. In another lawsuit (Bell Helicopter Textron Inc. v. Islamic Republic of Iran, Case No. 06cv1694, in U.S. District Court for the District of Columbia) brought by Iran against Textron earlier, Iran had sought damages against unfulfilled contracts dating back before revolution. Textron ultimately sent five commercial helicopters to Iran in addition to providing spare parts and training in 1994 to settle the dispute.

In summer of 2010, Iran requested that the United States deliver the 80th F-14 it had purchased in 1974, but delivery was denied after the Islamic Revolution.

== Major projects ==
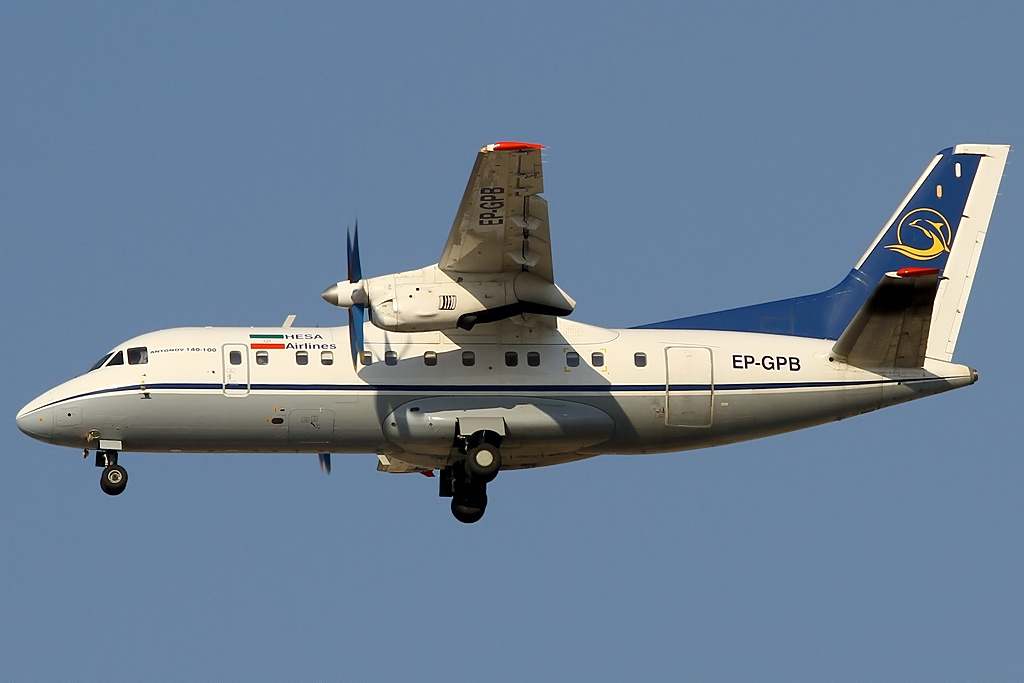
HESA manufactured and flown IrAn-140-100

Former Iranian President Mahmoud Ahmadinejad had favored the purchase of aircraft such as Iran-140 which are manufactured in Iran.

Iran's Aviation Industries Organization plans to manufacture 100 advanced Tupolev Tu-214 and Tu-204 airplanes with a capacity of 210 persons each in cooperation with Russia within the next 10 years. Iran also intends to manufacture at least 50 Ka-32 helicopters in Iran under license of Kamov and negotiations are underway to manufacture 50 An-148 under licence, probably with similar arrangements as Iran-140 to be named Iran-148. Agreements were signed with Russia for co-development and co-manufacture of an uncertain amount of Tu-334 airliners in Iran with production to commence simultaneously both in Iran and Russia. Another agreement with Poltava Helicopter Company of Ukraine allows Iran to manufacture the Aerokopter AK1-3 Sanka ultra-light multi-purpose helicopters in Iran. Yet, Iran says it is prepared to order passenger planes from Boeing and Airbus if the United States lifts sanctions against Iran.

In 2010, Iran's Defense Ministry said it will begin the production phase of a domestically manufactured medium-size passenger plane designed to carry up to 150 passengers.

In August 2018, IAIO unveiled the Kowsar (or Kosar) jet trainer and strike aircraft ahead of its maiden flight. The Kowsar will be produced in single and two-seater versions.

Iran states that it will become an exporter of plane parts within 7 years (2019). Iranian sources stated in March 2024, that Iran is self-sufficient in producing passenger plane spare parts citing the sanctions against Russia as the need to proceed with such a plan.

=== Jet engines ===
In 2016, Iran unveiled its first "national turbojet engine" dubbed "Owj" (Apex). Manufactured with more than 14,000 parts, it is capable of flight at 50,000 feet and can be mounted on planes with a maximum takeoff weight of ten tons. Iran says that superalloys and specialized furnaces "made in Iran" have been used for this engine. It is a reverse-engineered and enhanced version of the General Electric J85 turbojet engine (expected to serve with U.S. Air Force until 2040.)

== The 1979 Revolution and the Iran-Iraq war ==
With the 1979 Revolution, the Islamic Republic of Iran inherited an advanced air fleet because it had a large number of advanced imported Western aircraft. Also, the joining of the Homafarans to the revolution meant that the air force suffered little from the revolution. This gave Iran significant air superiority in the Iran-Iraq War, but on the other hand, the war also caused the exhaustion of the Iranian air fleet. This made the country feel the need to maintain, rebuild, and even produce various aircraft. Aircraft were maintained and rebuilt continuously during the war, but few aircraft were produced until the 1970s, and they were not at all comparable to today's technologies. These aircraft were mostly training aircraft such as the Tezro, which often did not reach mass production.

== Fighter jets ==
In the 1990s, Iran's aviation sector faced significant challenges due to the aftermath of the war and the imposition of sanctions. In response, the nation's leadership opted to pursue the localization of aircraft manufacturing. During this period, the first aircraft were developed through reverse engineering of the Northrop F-5. Notable examples include the Azarakhsh and the Simorgh training fighter, with some models achieving mass production.

== See also ==
- Iran Civil Aviation Organization
- Airlines of Iran
- Iran airshow
- Iranian Space Agency
- Economy of Iran
- Fajr Aviation & Composites Industry (civilian Co.)
- List of military equipment manufactured in Iran
