= 2009 Iranian Air Force Ilyushin Il-76 accident =

2009 Iranian Air Force Il-76MD Adnan 2 accident

2009 Iranian Air Force Il-76MD Adnan 2 accident
Accident
- Date: 22 September 2009
- Summary: Disputed
- Site: 15 km northwest of Varamin, Iran; 35.42913°N 51.54217°E
- Total fatalities: 7

First aircraft
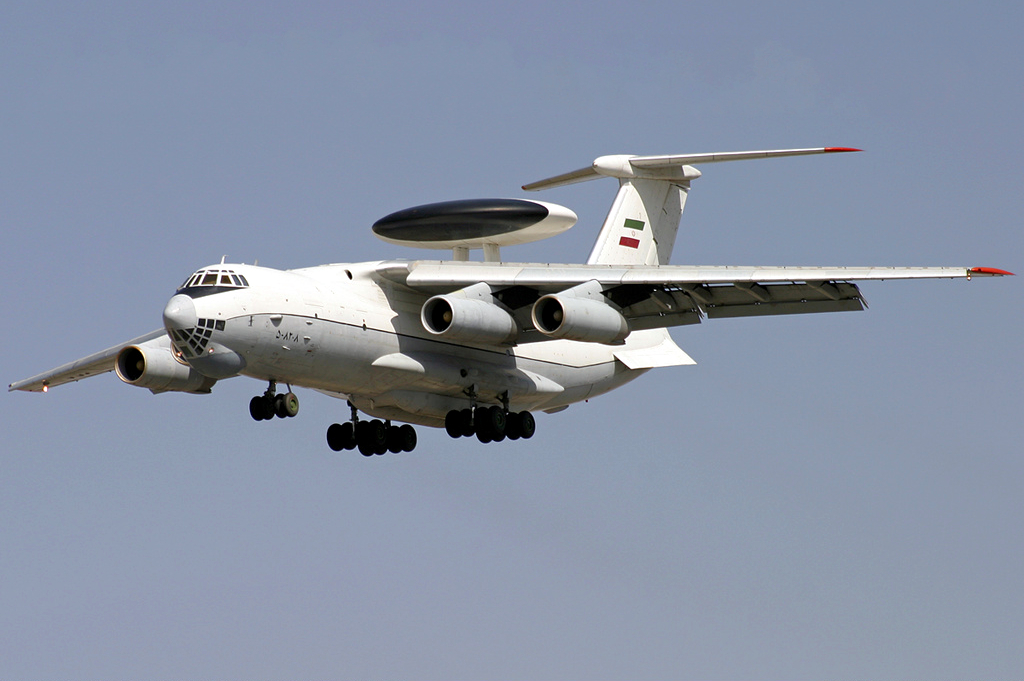
- An Ilyushin Il-76MD Adnan 2 similar to the one involved in the crash.
- Type: Ilyushin Il-76MD Adnan 2
- Name: Simorgh
- Operator: Islamic Republic of Iran Air Force
- Registration: 5-8208
- Occupants: 7
- Crew: 7
- Fatalities: 7
- Survivors: 0

Second aircraft
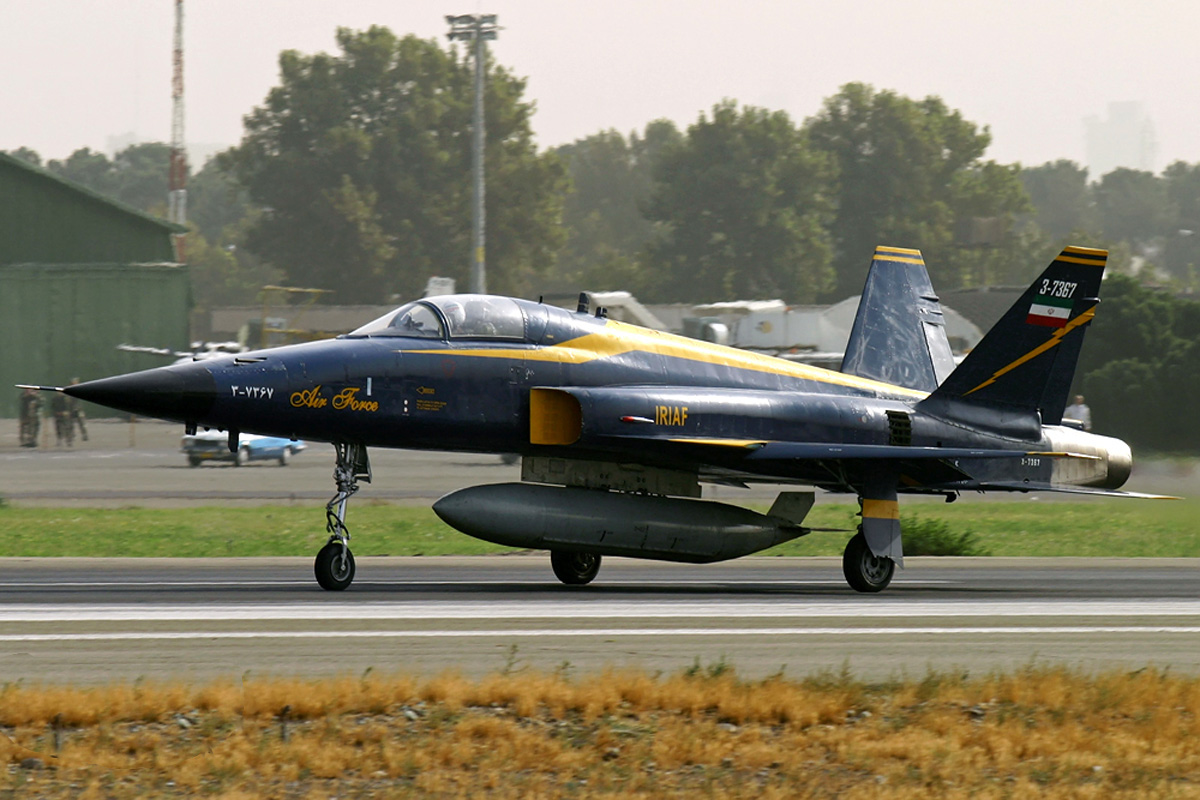
- A HESA Saeqeh of the Iranian Air Force
- Type: HESA Saeqeh
- Operator: Islamic Republic of Iran Air Force
- Registration: 3-7167
- Crew: 2
- Injuries: 2
- Survivors: 2

The 2009 Iranian Air Force Il-76MD Adnan 2 accident occurred on 22 September 2009, when an Ilyushin Il-76 crashed during a flyby near the city of Tehran. Sources conflict on the cause of the loss, with some stating that there was a mid-air collision with an Iranian Air Force Northrop F-5E Tiger II or a HESA Saeqeh, and others stating that the rotodome detached from the aircraft, striking and removing the tailplane while the aircraft was manoeuvring for an emergency landing following an engine fire. The crash resulted in the deaths of all seven people on board the plane and the destruction of Iran's only functional airborne early warning and control (AWACS) aircraft.

== Accident ==
A military parade was held in Tehran on 22 September 2009 to mark the anniversary of the start of the 1980–1988 Iran–Iraq War and was a send-off for President Mahmoud Ahmadinejad who was to give a speech at the United Nations General Assembly in New York on 23 September. A flyby by the Iranian Air Force was part of the parade involving the AWACS-equipped Ilyushin-76MD as well as Northrop F-5E Tiger IIs and HESA Saeqeh aircraft.

Sources vary on the cause of the accident. Some state that a fire developed in one of the engines, and that the radome detached when the aircraft was attempting to make an emergency landing on runway 29L at Tehran's Mehrabad International Airport. The detached radar dome struck the tail fin, removing it and causing loss of control which led to the aircraft crashing. Other sources state that the Il-76MD and one of the escorts collided in mid-air over the site of the tomb of former Iranian leader Ayatollah Khomeni.

The Ilyushin subsequently crashed in flames 15 km northwest of Varamin, killing all seven crew members on board. Some reports state that no mayday call was made, indicating a sudden event while other reports indicate that there was an emergency call from the aircraft with the pilot reporting an engine fire and calling for an emergency landing.

A video of the crash appeared on YouTube on 3 June 2011 uploaded by user Pooya Afaghi, showing the stricken IL-76MD with its rear fuselage missing, spiraling down out of control, and then impacting the ground. The appearance of the video was reported in the Huffington Post.

== Aircraft involved ==
=== IL-76 ===
The aircraft involved was an Ilyushin Il-76MD Adnan 2, a Soviet-built transport aircraft, later converted to an AWACS system by the Iraqi Military Industrialization Corporation for the Iraqi Air Force called the Ilyushin Il-76MD Adnan 2. It had been flown from Iraq to Iran in 1991 during the First Gulf War, given serial number 5-8208 and renamed from "Baghdad" to "Simorgh" (a flying creature of Iranian fable which performs wonders in mid-flight). After arrival in Iran, Russian technicians had reportedly upgraded the aircraft and installed a newer Iranian-made radar, which could trace flying objects within a 1,000 kilometres (540 nmi) range. The aircraft came into service in April 2008 and was the only AWACS-equipped Iranian aircraft.

=== Possible second aircraft ===
If a mid-air collision was the cause of the accident, some sources state that the second aircraft involved was a Northrop F-5E Tiger II.
