= HESA Shafaq =

Iranian prototype stealth aircraft

Shafaq
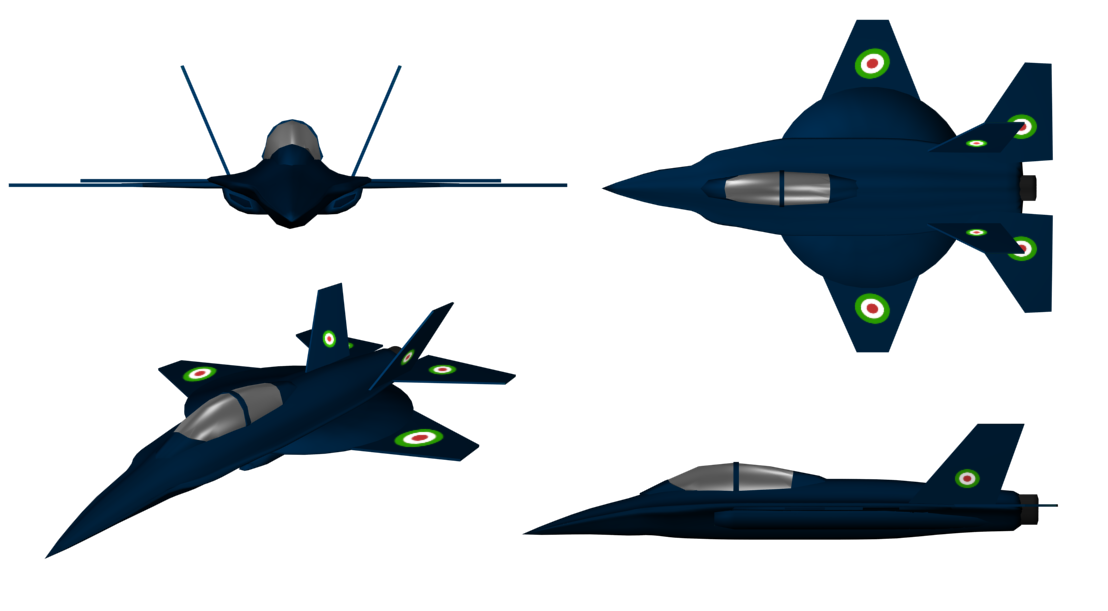

General information
- Type: Trainer / Attack aircraft
- National origin: Iran
- Manufacturer: Iran Aircraft Manufacturing Industrial Company (HESA)
- Designer: Aviation University Complex
- Status: Prototype
- Primary user: Iran
- Number built: One prototype

History
- First flight: 2017 (forecast, but not achieved)
- Developed from: M-ATF

The HESA Shafaq or Shafagh (Persian: هواپیمای شفق, "Twilight" or "Aurora") is an Iranian subsonic stealth aircraft project being developed by the Iran Aircraft Manufacturing Industrial Company (HESA).

== Development ==
According to reports, the Shafaq will be a subsonic aircraft, but this might be changed. Additionally, Iranian officials have reported that the Shafaq will have a skin of radar-absorbing material.

This two-seat advanced training and attack aircraft appears to be based on the Russian-Iranian "Project Integral" and is fitted with Russian ejection seats. Reportedly, there are plans to produce three versions—a two-seat trainer/light strike version and two one-seat fighter-bomber versions.

The Shafaq is designed by the Aviation University Complex (AUC), part of the Malek-Ashtar University of Technology (MUT). At the start of the program, Iran received help from Russia and the aircraft was known as Integral. Russia later backed away from this project for several reasons and Iran carried on the project by itself renaming it Shafaq. The Shafaq is designed as a sub-sonic aircraft, and made of radar-absorbing material. It has a large leading edge root extension (LERX) and a root aft of the wing which gives it an unusual circular sub-section.

A 1/7 scale model of the Shafaq has already completed testing in the AUC's wind tunnel and pictures have already been revealed which show that a full-scale model has already been built. The Shafaq will be built in different configurations including a two-seater trainer, a two-seater light Attack and a one-seater light attack variants. Roll-out of the first prototype was scheduled for 2008. The Shafaq's advanced cockpit features color MFDs and a Russian-made K-36D ejection seat.

According to AIO (Aerospace Industries Organisation), the aircraft was expected to be flight tested during 2017, and featuring twin, outwardly canted vertical fins. This type of a tail design has become a favoured aerodynamic feature of Iranian designers that dates back to the development of the reverse-engineered Iranian version of the Northrop F-5, the HESA Saeqeh.

== Specifications ==
Data from Trend

General characteristics

- Crew: 1 or 2
- Length: 10.84 m (35 ft 7 in)
- Wingspan: 10.45 m (34 ft 3 in)
- Height: 4.26 m (14 ft 0 in)
- Empty weight: 4,361 kg (9,614 lb)
- Max takeoff weight: 6,900 kg (15,212 lb)
- Powerplant: 1 × Klimov RD-33 turbofan engine, 50 kN (11,000 lbf) thrust

Performance

- Service ceiling: 16,780 m (55,050 ft)
- Rate of climb: 110 m/s (22,000 ft/min)

Armament

- Missiles: Sattar, Shahbaz or Fatter missiles

== See also ==
- Equipment of the Iranian Army

Aircraft of comparable role, configuration, and era

- IAIO Qaher-313
- Hongdu L-15
- Yakovlev Yak-130

Related lists

- List of fighter aircraft
