= General Electric J85 =

Turbojet aircraft engine

J85
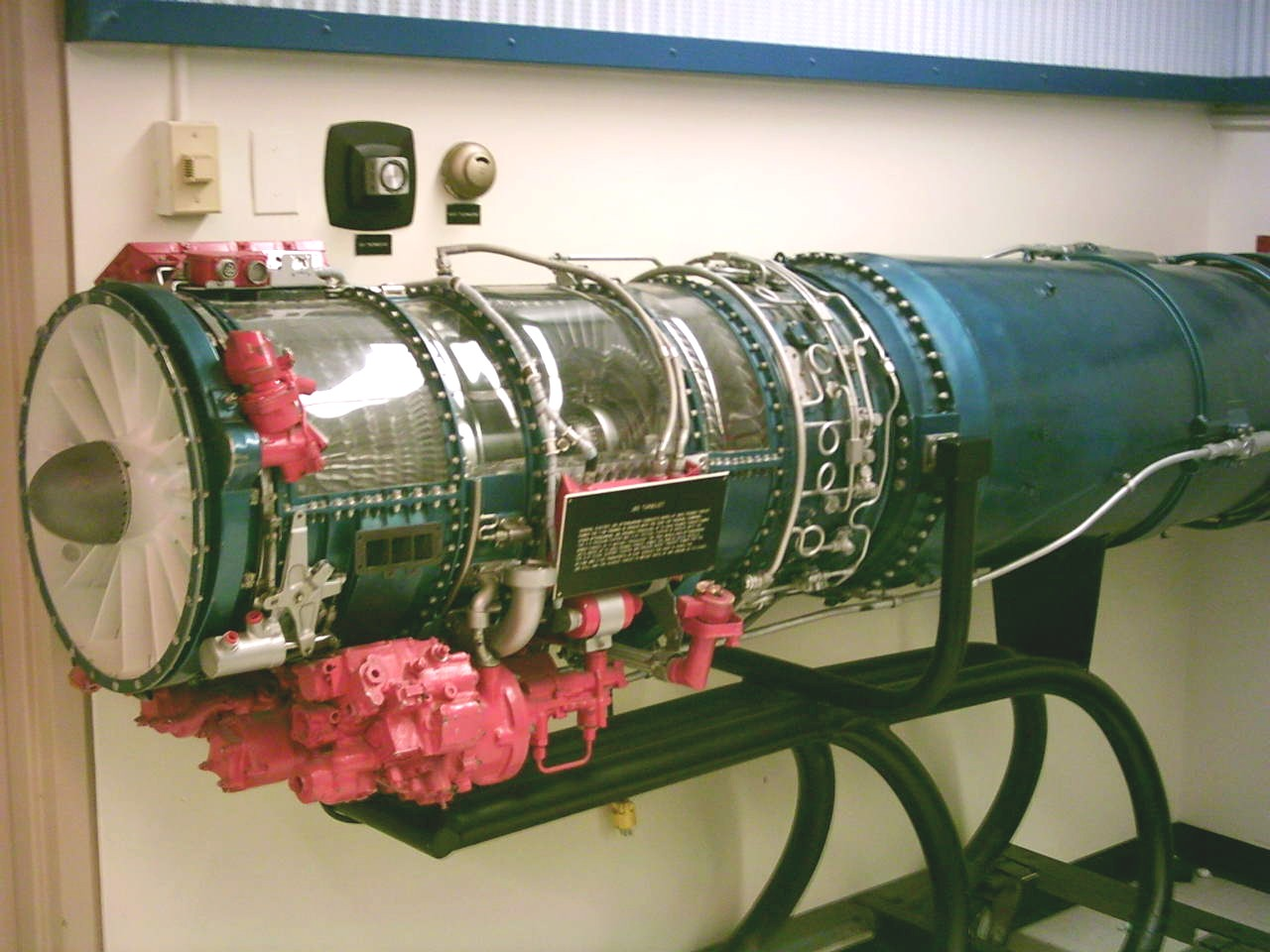
- A General Electric J85-5
- Type: Turbojet
- National origin: United States
- Manufacturer: General Electric
- First run: 1950s
- Major applications: Cessna A-37 Dragonfly; Canadair CT-114 Tutor; Northrop F-5; Northrop T-38 Talon
- Developed into: General Electric CF700
- Variants: General Electric CJ610

The General Electric J85 is a small single-shaft turbojet engine. Military versions produce up to 3,500 lb_{f} (16 kN) of thrust dry; afterburning variants can reach up to 5,000 lb_{f} (22 kN). The engine, depending upon additional equipment and specific model, weighs from 300 to 500 pounds (140 to 230 kg). It is one of GE's most successful and longest in service military jet engines, with the civilian versions having logged over 16.5 million hours of operation. The United States Air Force plans to continue using the J85 in aircraft through 2040. Civilian models, known as the CJ610, are similar but supplied without an afterburner and are identical to non-afterburning J85 variants, while the CF700 adds a rear-mounted fan for improved fuel economy.

== Design and development ==
The J85 was originally designed to power a large decoy missile, the McDonnell ADM-20 Quail. The Quail was designed to be released from a B-52 Stratofortress in-flight and fly for long distances in formation with the launch aircraft, multiplying the number of targets facing the SA-2 surface-to-air missile operators on the ground. This mission demanded a small engine that could nevertheless provide enough power to keep up with the jet bomber. Like the similar Armstrong Siddeley Viper being built in the UK, the engine on a Quail drone had no need to last for extended periods of time, so therefore could be built of low-quality materials.

The fit was a success on the Quail, but again like the Viper it was later built with normal grade materials and subsequently used to power small jet aircraft, including the Northrop T-38 Talon, Northrop F-5, Canadair CT-114 Tutor, and Cessna A-37 Dragonfly light attack aircraft. More recently, J85s have powered the Scaled Composites White Knight aircraft, the carrier for the Scaled Composites SpaceShipOne spacecraft, and the Me 262 Project.

The basic engine design is quite small, about 17.7 inches (45 cm) in diameter, and 45.4 inches (115 cm) long. It features an eight-stage axial-flow compressor powered by two turbine stages, and is capable of generating up to 2,100 lb_{f} (9.3 kN) of dry thrust, or more with an afterburner. At full throttle at sea level, this engine, without afterburner, consumes approximately 400 US gallons (1,500 L) of fuel per hour. At cruise altitude and power, it consumes approximately 100 US gal (380 L) per hour.

Several variants were produced.

The most advanced variant in the J85 series is the J85-21 model designed specifically for the F-5E/F during its development process.

The J85-21 design replaces AM 355 chromium nickel molybdenum stainless steel alloy, used by previous J85 models for compressor rotors and blades, with a titanium alloy. Its inlet diameter was increased from 17.7 in (45 cm) to 20.8 in (53 cm), and it included an added stage ahead of the base 8-stage compressor for a total of 9 stages. Its multiple disk rotors were replaced with a single-spool rotor, thus improving dry thrust to 3,600 lb_{f} (16 kN) and wet thrust to 5,000 lb_{f} (22 kN) while reducing mechanical complexity along with the weight gain of the J85-21 model.

More than 12,000 J85 engines had been built by the time production ended in 1988.

=== Iranian reverse engineering ===
The Iranian Ministry of Defense constructed a new engine based on the General Electric J85-GE-21B named "OWJ" and presented it at a defense exhibition on 22 August 2016.

The Owj engine has been used in several Iranian products like Kowsar, Saeghe and Azarakhsh fighter jets or Yasin training jet.

== Variants ==
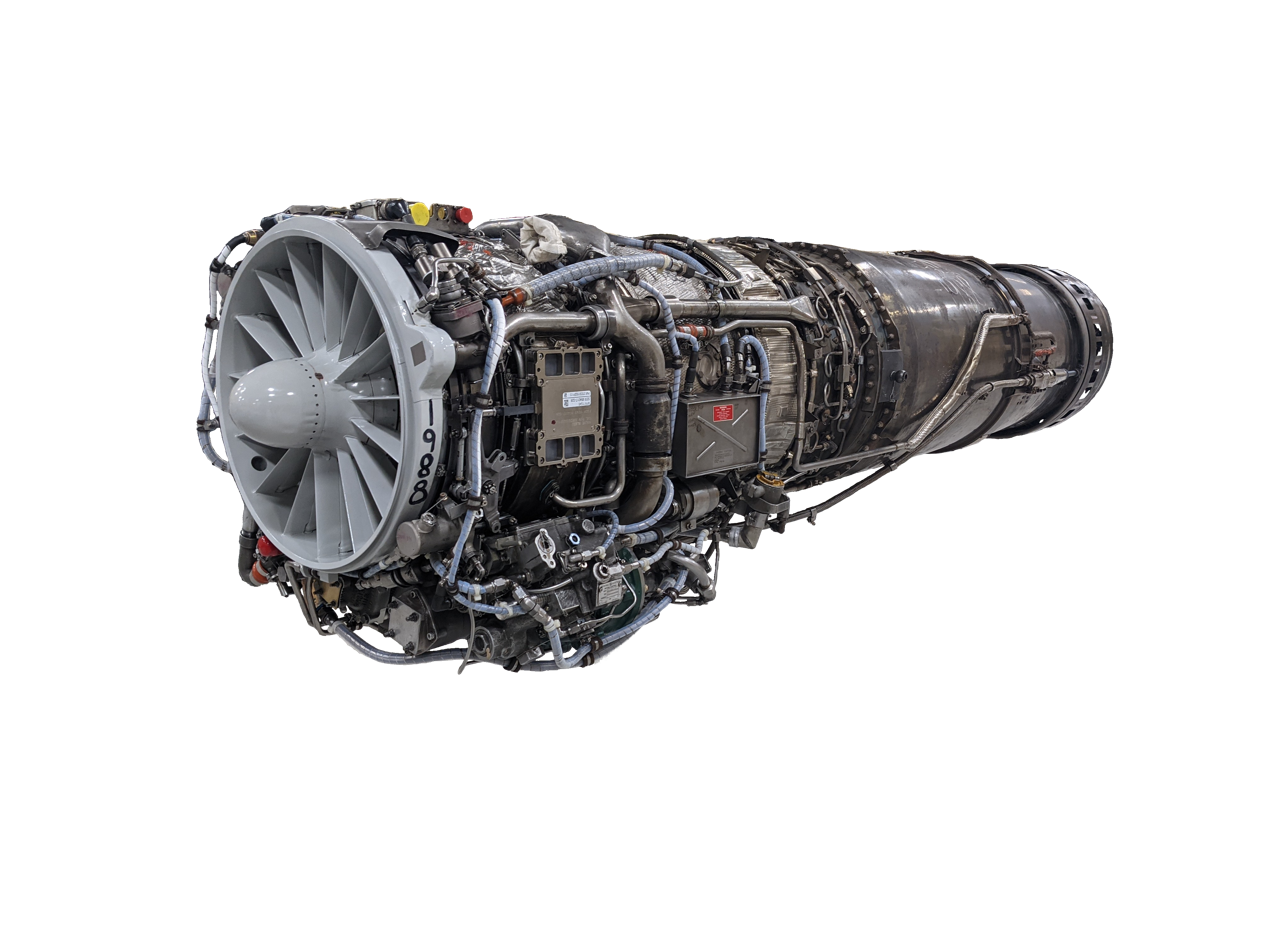
J85-GE-5 out of a T-38C

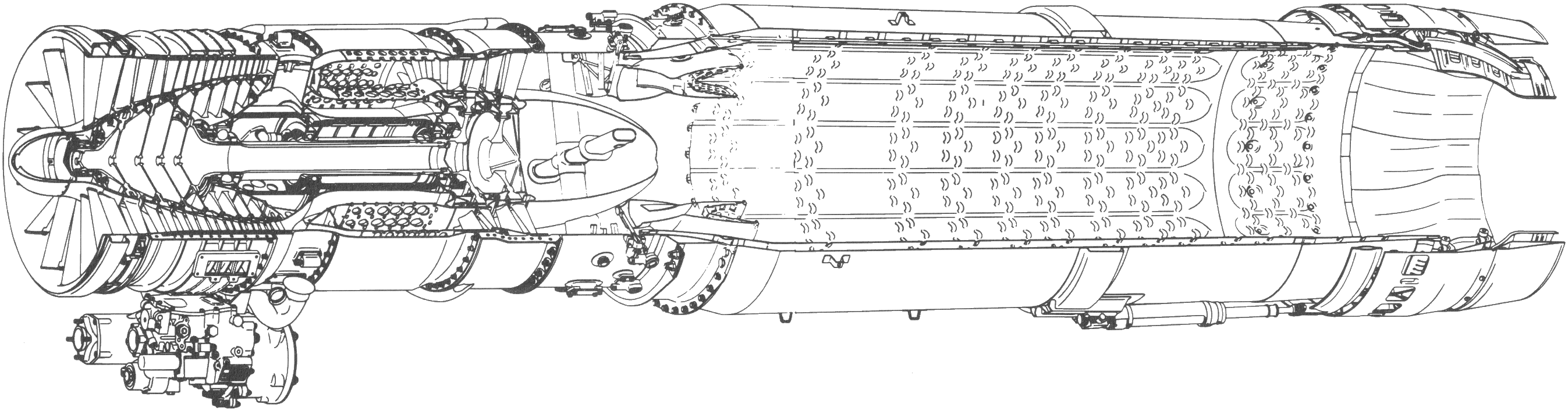
YJ85-GE-5 cutaway line drawing

Thrust given in pound force (lbf) and kilonewtons (kN).

J85-GE-1
1,900–2,100 lb_{f} (8.5–9.3 kN)
J85-GE-2
2,850 lb_{f} (12.7 kN)
J85-GE-3
2,450 lb_{f} (10.9 kN)
J85-GE-4
2,950 lb_{f} (13.1 kN)
J85-GE-4A
2,950 lb_{f} (13.1 kN)
J85-GE-5
2,680 lb_{f} (11.9 kN) dry / 3,850 lb_{f} (17.1 kN) afterburning
J85-GE-5A
2,680 lb_{f} (11.9 kN) dry / 3,850 lb_{f} (17.1 kN) afterburning
J85-GE-7
2,450 lb_{f} (10.9 kN)
J85-GE-12
2,400 lb_{f} (11 kN)
J85-GE-13
2,720 lb_{f} (12.1 kN), dry / 4,080 lb_{f} (18.1 kN) afterburning
J85-GE-13A
License built for the Fiat G.91Y, 2,720 lb_{f} (12.1 kN) dry / 4,080 lb_{f} (18.1 kN) afterburning
J85-GE-15
2,925 lb_{f} (13.01 kN) dry / 4,300 lb_{f} (19 kN) afterburning
J85-CAN-15
Orenda manufactured J85-GE-15 for the Canadair CF-116, 2,925 lb_{f} (13.01 kN) dry / 4,300 lb_{f} (19 kN) afterburning
J85-GE-17
2,850 lb_{f} (12.7 kN)
J85-GE-17A
2,850 lb_{f} (12.7 kN)
J85-GE-17B
2,850 lb_{f} (12.7 kN)
J85-GE-17C
2,850 lb_{f} (12.7 kN)
J85-GE-19
3,015 lb_{f} (13.41 kN) dry
J85-GE-21A
3,500 lb_{f} (16 kN) dry / 5,000 lb_{f} (22 kN) afterburning
J85-GE-J1A
3,500 lb_{f} (16 kN) dry / 5,000 lb_{f} (22 kN) afterburning
J85-GE-J2
2,850 lb_{f} (12.7 kN)
J85-GE-J4
2,950 lb_{f} (13.1 kN)
J85-CAN-40
Manufactured by Orenda for the Canadair CT-114 Tutor, 2,650 lb_{f} (11.8 kN)
J85-GE-100
2,450 lb_{f} (10.9 kN)

== Applications ==
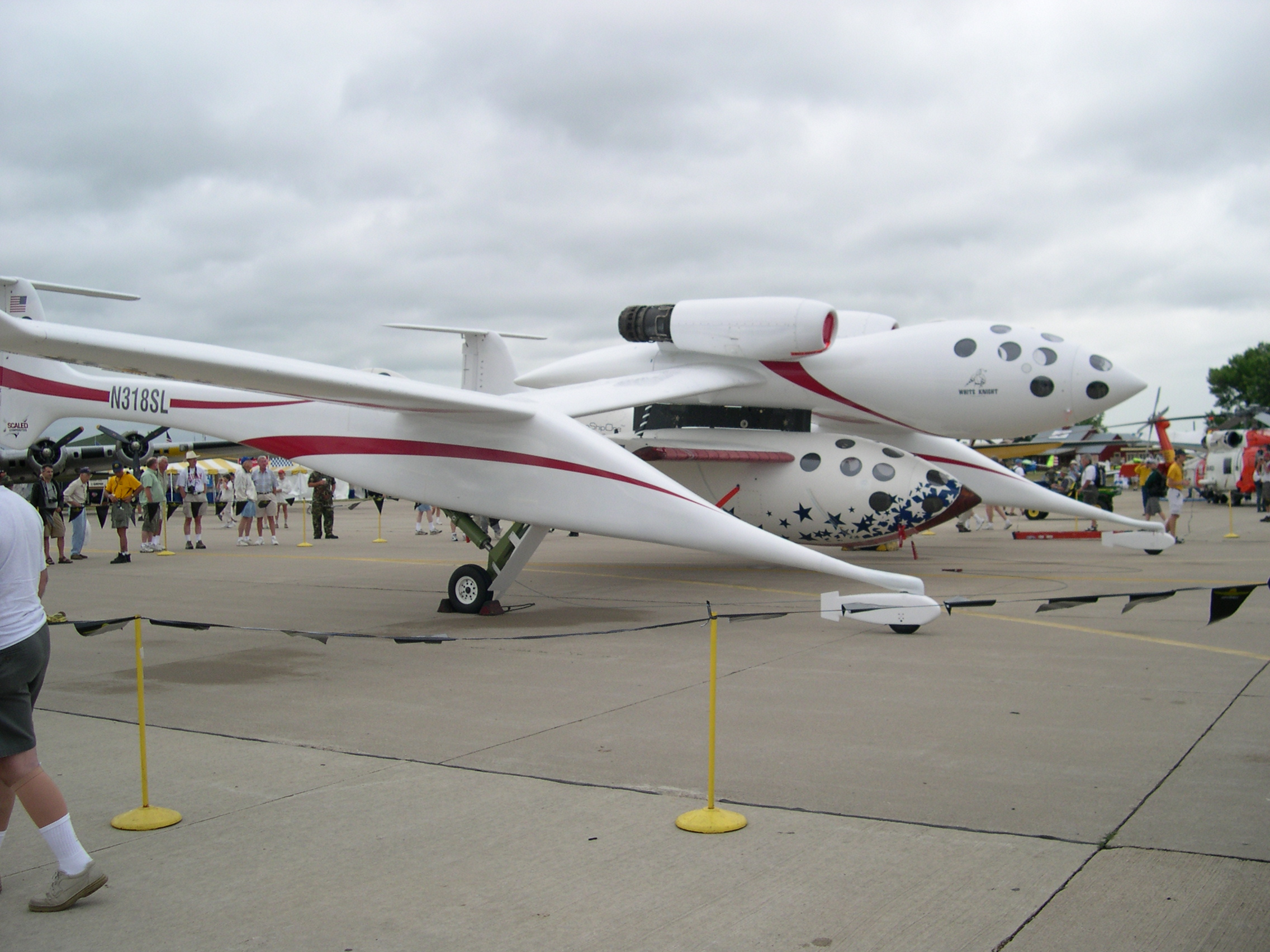
Scaled Composites White Knight sporting two General Electric J85 afterburning engines

- Bell X-14A/B
- Boom XB-1 demonstrator
- Canadair CT-114 Tutor
- Canadair CF-5
- Cessna A-37 Dragonfly
- HESA Yasin (without afterburner)
- HESA Kowsar (with afterburner)
- Fairchild C-123 Provider
- Fairchild AC-119K
- Fiat G.91Y
- Lockheed Have Blue
- Lockheed F-117 Nighthawk
- McDonnell ADM-20 Quail decoy missile
- North American Rockwell OV-10 Bronco - OV-10B(Z) target tug variant, the engine in addition to its turboprops
- North American T-2 Buckeye
- Northrop F-5
- Northrop T-38 Talon
- Republic AP-100
- Ryan MQM-34D Mod II target drone
- Ryan XV-5 Vertifan
- Saab 105Ö
- Scaled Composites White Knight

=== Other ===
- American Challenge water speed record jet-powered boat - Two J85-GE-21s
- Hermeus experimental turbine-based combined cycle "Chimera" turboramjet engine - J85-21 turbojet core
- Boom Technology XB-1 "baby boom" Experimental supersonic aircraft. it uses 3 J85-15 turbojet engines

== Specifications (J85-GE-21) ==
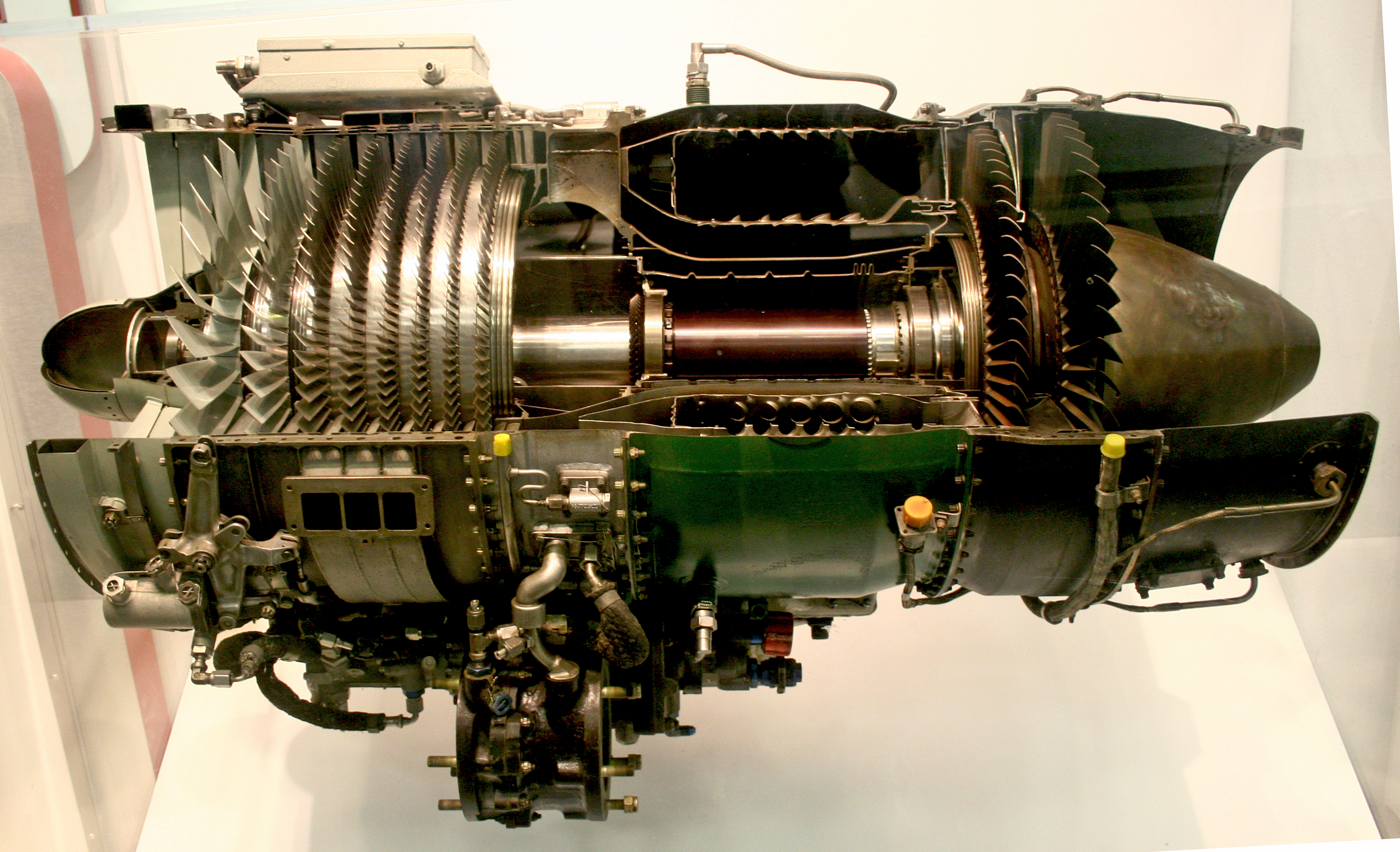
A J85-GE-17A engine sectioned for display

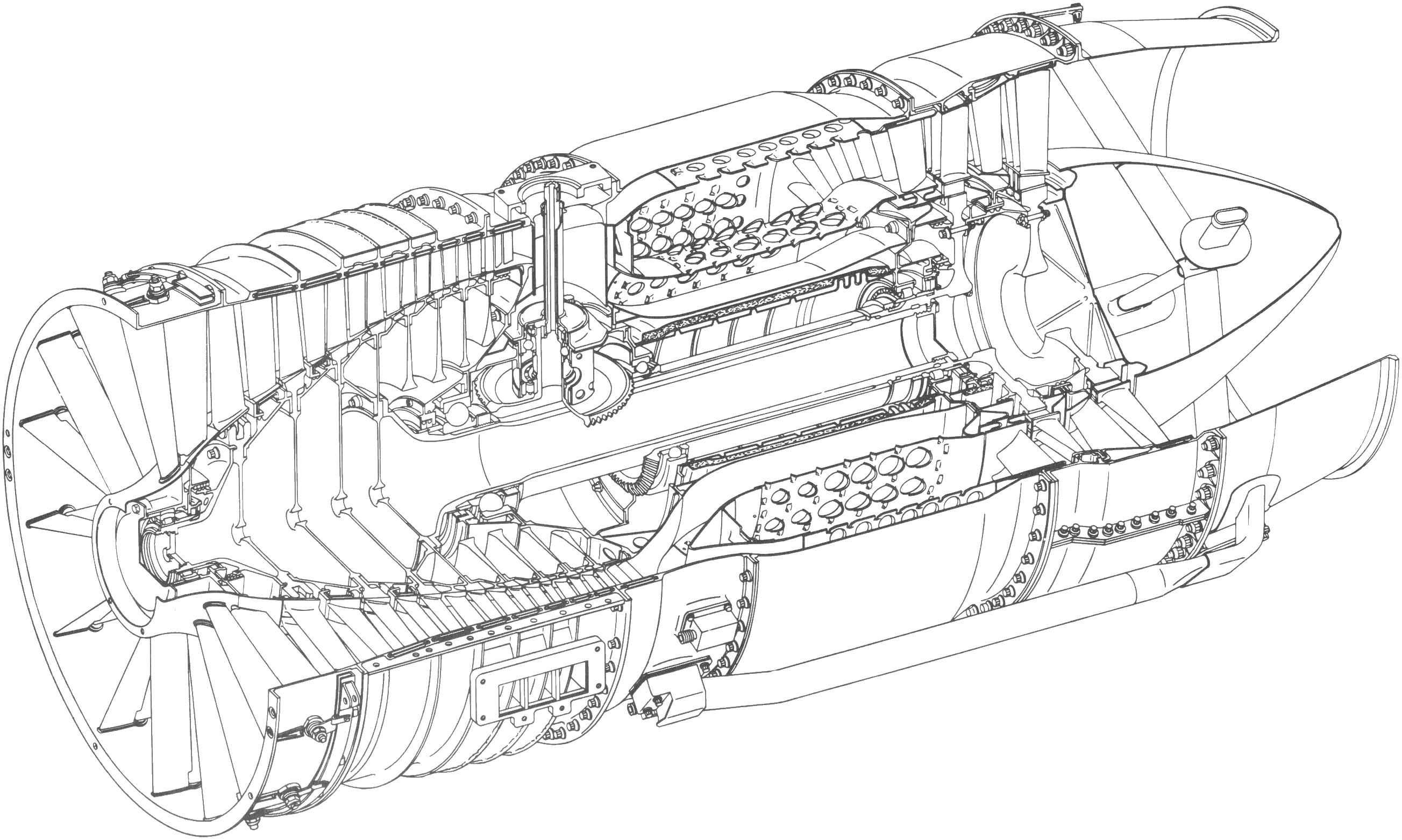
J85-GE-7 cutaway line drawing

Data from

==== General characteristics ====
- Type: afterburning turbojet engine
- Length: 112.5 in (286 cm)
- Diameter: 20.8 in (53 cm) inlet
- Dry weight: 684 lb (310 kg)

==== Components ====
- Compressor: single-spool 9 axial stages
- Combustors: annular
- Turbine: 2 stages
- Fuel type: jet fuel

==== Performance ====
- Maximum thrust: 3,600 lb_{f} (16 kN) dry thrust / 5,000 lb_{f} (22 kN) afterburner thrust
- Overall pressure ratio: 8.3:1 (J85-21 A~C model)
- Air mass flow: 53 lb (24 kg) per second
- Turbine inlet temperature: 1,790 °F (980 °C)
- Specific fuel consumption: 1.24 lb/(lbf⋅h) or 35 g/(kN⋅s) dry thrust / 2.13 lb/(lbf⋅h) or 60 g/(kN⋅s) afterburner thrust
- Thrust-to-weight ratio: 5.25 dry / 7.3 afterburner

== See also ==
Related development

- General Electric CJ610
- General Electric CF700

Comparable engines

- Armstrong Siddeley Viper
- Continental J69
- Fairchild J83
- Rolls-Royce Soar

Related lists

- List of aircraft engines
