= Iran Kish Air Show =

Biennial airshow on Kish Island, Iran

Kish Air Show نمایشگاه هوایی کیش
- Genre: Commercial Air Show
- Dates: December
- Frequency: Biennial: Even years
- Venue: Kish International Airport
- Locations: Kish Island, Persian Gulf
- Coordinates: 26.5261°N 53.9802°E
- Country: Iran
- Established: 2002; 24 years ago
- Most recent: 2024
- Next event: 2026
- Attendance: 120
- Major events: Aerobatic Displays; Static Displays
- Organizer: Kish Free Zone Organization

The Kish Airshow also known as Persian Gulf Airshow is an aviation airshow held biennially on Kish Island, Iran. The first airshow was held on Kish Island in 2002, when 11 foreign companies participated from France, Russia, United Kingdom, Ukraine, Germany, Czech Republic, Italy, The Netherlands, Pakistan, Slovakia and Switzerland. Its second airshow was held in 2005. One hundred companies participated, making the airshow nearly five times larger than the inaugural 2002 edition. Because of this success in 2005, it was decided to launch another airshow in the year after. Downplaying U.S. sanctions on Iran, during the 2005 airshow, Iran signed a $980 million contract for the purchase of 25 Fokker aircraft with the Dutch company. The foreign participating countries in 2005 included Germany, Australia, France, United Kingdom, Italy, The Netherlands, Russia, Ukraine, Switzerland, Sweden, Belgium, Malaysia, and United Arab Emirates.

== Air shows ==
#	Place	Date	Details
1	Kish, Iran	30-10-2002 until 3-11-2002	26 international and Iranian aviation companies participated.
2	Kish, Iran	18-01-2005 until 21-01-2005	100 international and Iranian aviation companies participated.
3	Kish, Iran	24-11-2006 until 1-12-2006	
4	Kish, Iran	28-10-2008 until 31-10-2008	
5	Kish, Iran	9-11-2010 until 12-11-2010	Representatives from more than 120 international aviation companies, including companies based in the United States, the United Kingdom and Italy, reportedly are expected to attend.
6	Kish, Iran	11-12-2012 until 14-12-2012	A large number of domestic companies active in the aviation, aerospace, airlines and the other related industries and universities as well as foreign companies took part at the fourth Iran Kish Air Show and exhibited a vast range of products, systems and services in the aviation and air space fields. These events received a warm welcome from the trades and specialists.
7	Kish, Iran	18-11-2014 until 21-11-2014	A large number of domestic companies active in the aviation, aerospace, airlines and the other related industries and universities as well as foreign companies took part at the fourth Iran Kish Air Show and exhibited a vast range of products, systems and services in the aviation and air space fields.
8	Kish, Iran	16-11-2016 until 19-11-2016	A large number of domestic companies active in the aviation, aerospace, airlines and the other related industries and universities as well as foreign companies took part at the fourth Iran Kish Air Show and exhibited a vast range of products, systems and services in the aviation and air space fields. These events received a warm welcome from the trades and specialists.

== Iranian market ==
In 2010, Iran's Defense Ministry said it will begin the production phase of a domestically manufactured medium-size passenger plane designed to carry up to 150 passengers. With a population of 82 million, Iran needs to have at least 400-500 new airplanes in the next 10 years to replace their outdated fleet.

== See also ==
- List of airlines of Iran
- Iran Aviation Industries Organization
- Islamic Republic of Iran Armed Forces
- Islamic Republic of Iran Air Force
- List of aircraft of the Iranian Air Force
- Defense industry of Iran
- List of equipment of the Iranian Army
