= HESA Azarakhsh =

Iranian fighter aircraft

Azarakhsh
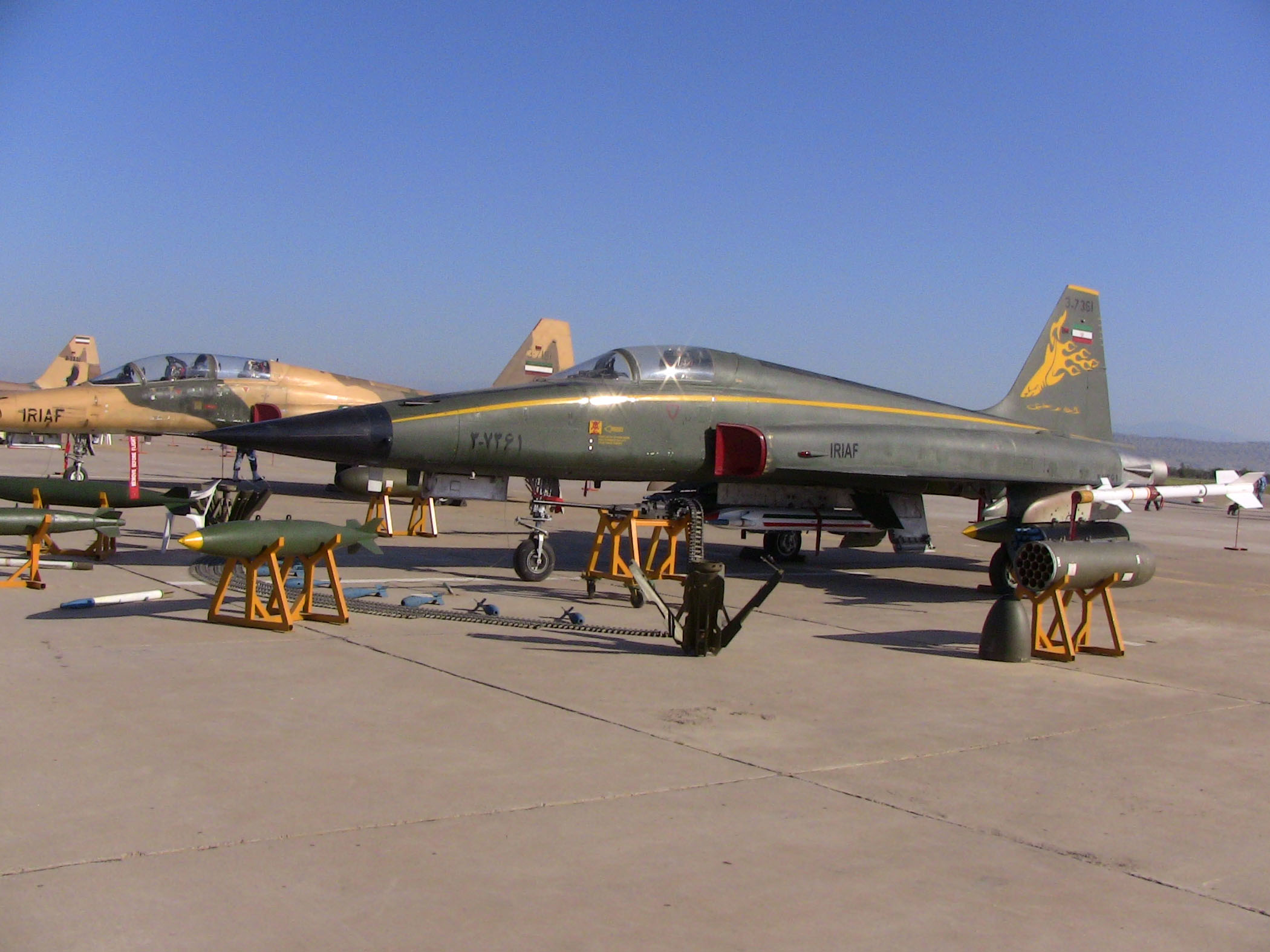
- HESA Azarakhsh on display at Vahdati Air Base

General information
- Type: Light fighter
- Manufacturer: Iran Aircraft Manufacturing Industrial Company (HESA)
- Status: In service (production completed)
- Primary user: Islamic Republic of Iran Air Force
- Number built: 6

History
- Introduction date: 1997
- Developed from: Northrop F-5
- Developed into: HESA Saeqeh; HESA Kowsar

The HESA Azarakhsh (Persian: آذرخش Âzaraxš, "Thunderbolt") is a jet fighter aircraft manufactured by the Iran Aircraft Manufacturing Industrial Company (HESA). It is widely regarded as a rebuilt and renamed American Northrop F-5 Freedom Fighter/Tiger II although Iranian authorities claim it is Iran's first domestically manufactured combat jet fighter.

The Azarakhsh was developed in Isfahan by the Iranian military, the Iranian Defense Ministry, and aircraft-manufacturing company HESA.

== Development ==
In April 1997 Iranian Brigadier General Arasteh, a deputy head of the General Staff of the Armed Forces, declared that Iran had successfully designed, constructed and tested its first fighter aircraft. By late 1997 it was reported that Iran had begun producing the aircraft and by mid-2000 four aircraft were said to be undergoing operational tests, with production proceeding at a rate of around ten aircraft per year.

On May 17, 2000, Iran's acting commander of the Air Force said that Azarakhsh had reached mass-production stage. On August 5, 2007, Azarakhsh conducted a successful test flight. On August 6, 2007, Ministry of Defense Mostafa Mohammad-Najjar said, "[Azarakhsh] is now at the stage of industrial production and its mass production will start in the future."

== Design ==
=== Azarakhsh ===
Production started by late 1997 and as of 2001 there were six aircraft reported to be in service. Iran has yet to release any additional information about the aircraft and its capabilities are unknown.

There are no known differences between the Azarakhsh and the original Northrop F-5E. Coupled with the fact only very few Azarakhsh jets have been observed since the claimed start of production indicates that the Azarakhsh is not a new-built jet fighter, but a rebuild of existing Northrop F-5s.

=== Saeqeh ===
The HESA Saeqeh is a follow on aircraft, derived from the Azarakhsh fighter. As with many previous indigenous Iranian developed weapons, no performance data has been released to verify official claims. An unknown number of this generation have been built (more likely modernized) and are reported to have entered service with the Islamic Republic of Iran Air Force (IRIAF) on September 22, 2007.

=== Kowsar ===
In August 2018, IAIO unveiled the Kowsar (or Kosar) jet trainer and strike aircraft. The Kowsar will be produced in single and two-seater versions.

== See also ==
Related development

- Northrop F-5
- HESA Saeqeh
- HESA Kowsar
