= HESA Saeqeh =

Iranian fighter aircraft

Saeqeh
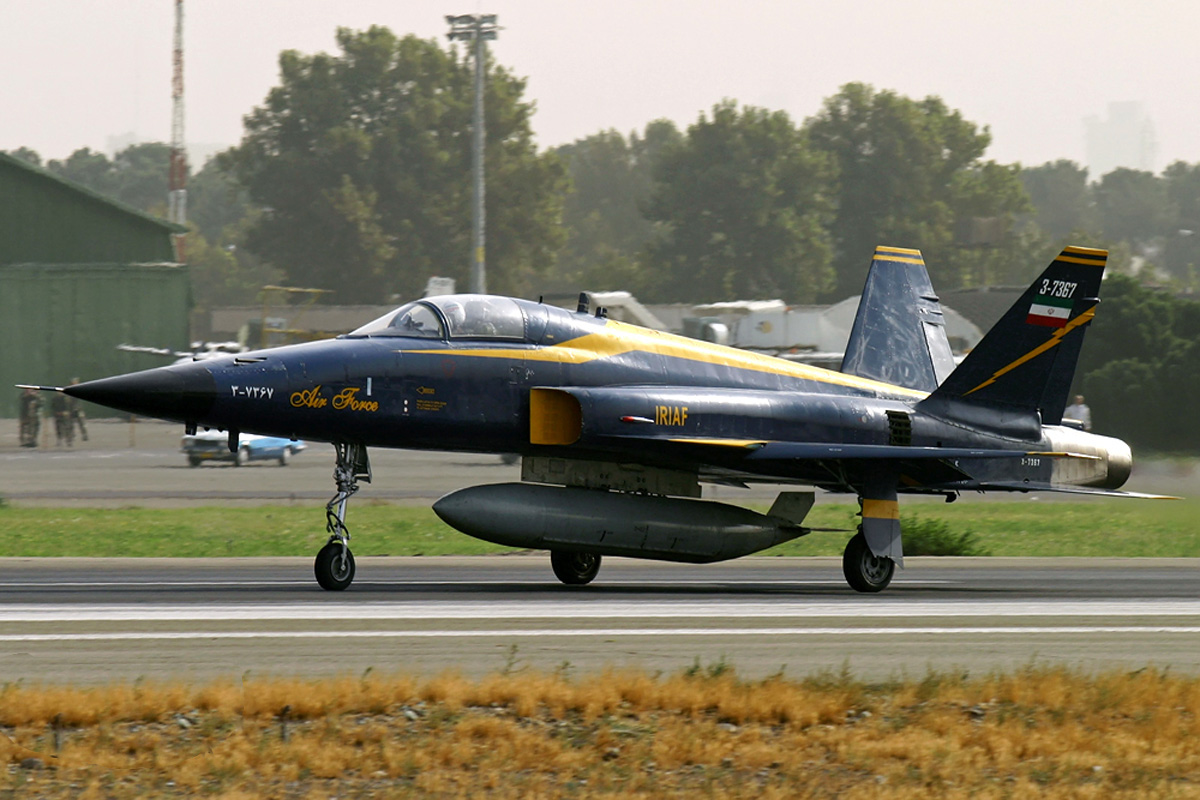

General information
- Type: Light fighter
- Manufacturer: Iran Aircraft Manufacturing Industrial Company (HESA)
- Status: Production completed
- Primary user: Islamic Republic of Iran Air Force
- Number built: 12

History
- Introduction date: 22 September 2007
- First flight: July 2004
- Developed from: Northrop F-5; HESA Azarakhsh
- Developed into: HESA Kowsar

The HESA Saeqeh (Persian: صاعقه, romanized: Sâ'eğe, lit. 'Thunderbolt'), alternatively spelled Sa'eqeh; Saegheh, or Saeqeh-80, is an Iranian-rebuilt single-seat jet fighter, derived from the American Northrop F-5. A joint product of the Islamic Republic of Iran Air Force and the Iranian Ministry of Defence, it is the second generation of the Iranian Azarakhsh fighter. Saeqeh aircraft were tested successfully in Iran 20 September 2007.

== Development ==
The first prototype of the jet was shown on state television making a test flight in July 2004. In that exercise, which began on August 19, 2006, the new fighter carried out actions described as "a mission to bomb virtual enemy targets" and "a mock bombing mission". A prototype, which appeared to differ from the one that had been shown previously, conducted a fly-past at Tehran's Mehrabad Airport on 20 September 2007. The Saeqeh prototype, together with an Azarakhsh, took part in a military parade on 22 September 2007.

Iran has announced that it will test fly the other variants of the Saeqeh in the near future which will differ from the previous aircraft due to major changes in its weapon system, aerodynamics and operational range.

In September 2010, Iran displayed the first squadron of Saeqeh fighter jets produced during an air show staged during the military parades at the beginning of the Iranian Sacred Defence Week according to the FARS News Agency. In May 2012 Defense Minister Ahmad Vahidi stated that three new-generation Saeqeh fighters had been manufactured and delivered to the Air Force.

On 26 August 2012, deputy Defence Minister Mohammad Eslami announced that an upgraded version of the Saeqeh would be introduced in the Iranian Air Force by the end of 2013. (Note: The Solar Hijri year 1391 on the Iranian calendar)

In total five of the Saeqeh-1 single seat variant and one Saeqeh-2 twin seat variant were manufactured before production ended, and production shifted to the HESA Kowsar instead.

== Design ==
Little information on the specifications of the Saeqeh has been released. The Commander of the Islamic Republic of Iran Air Force, Brigadier-General Ahmad Mighani, said that the Saeqeh is up-to-date in terms of aerodynamic balance and in possessing missile and radar systems. The Managing Director of the Aviation Organization of the Ministry of Defense and Logistics of the Armed Forces, Majid Hedayat, described the Saeqeh as a logistic and combat plane with high manoeuvring capability and an ability to bomb close targets. The airframe resembles a Northrop F-5 with two vertical stabilizers instead of one.

In 2008, Iran announced the aircraft has a range of 3,000 km (1,864 mi). It has a Phazotron-NIIR N019 radar known as "Baaz" with a range of 80 km (50 miles) that can track 10 targets and engage two targets simultaneously.

The visual differences between the Saeqeh and the original Northrop F-5E remain limited to two vertical tail stabilizers instead of one, additional wing strakes and altered jet intakes. Fuselage, landing gear, engines, weaponry and cockpit instruments appear identical to the F-5E, which indicates that the Saequeh is not a new-built jet fighter, but a modification of existing Northrop F-5s.

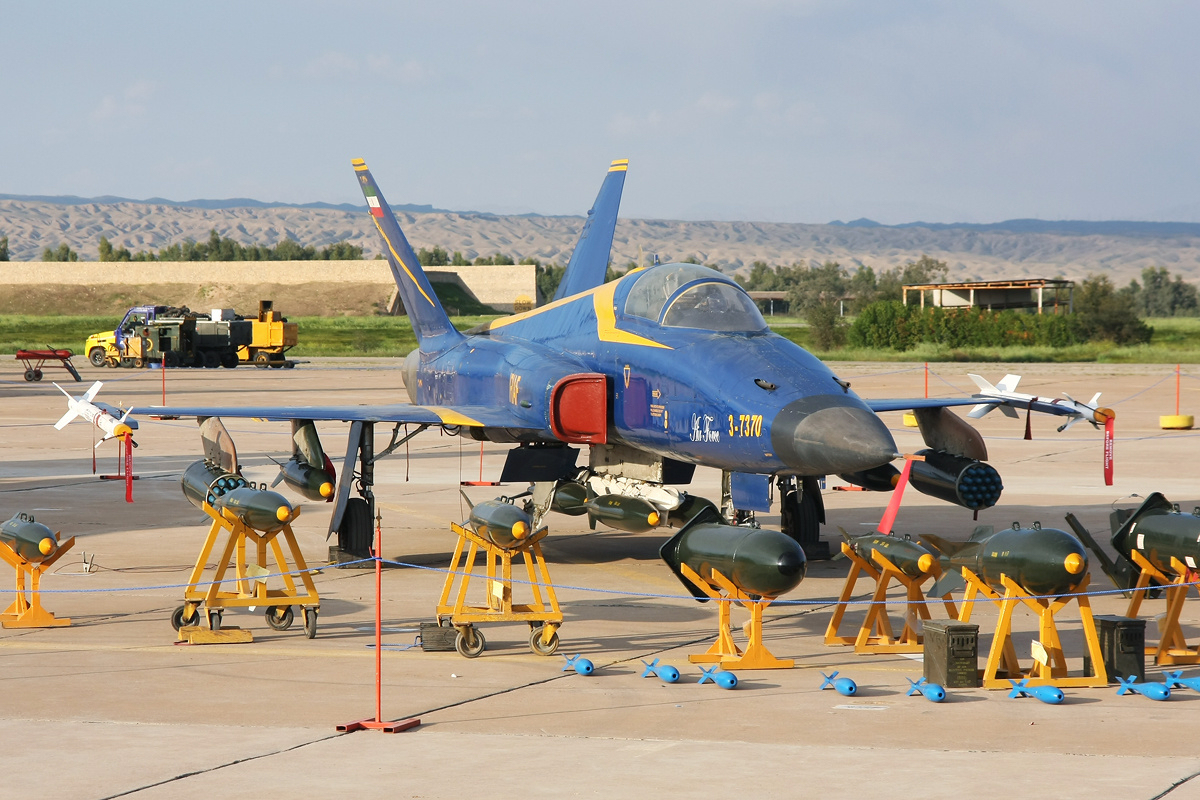
Iranian Air Force HESA Saeqeh

=== Saeqeh-2 ===
A new version was introduced in 2015 with 2 seats, more advanced weapon systems, electronics and avionics. This model can also be used for training purposes. According to one Iranian military source:

"… [Iran] will [soon] manufacture an aircraft on Saeqeh platform which will be equipped with Fourth generation (and even higher) avionics …,"
- Commander of Air Force's Owj Complex Colonel Houshang Monfaredzadeh, 2015

The IRIAF is believed to have 17 Northrop F-5F aircraft remaining in its inventory, which may be suitable for conversion to the Saeqeh-2 configuration.

== Operators ==
Iran

- Islamic Republic of Iran Air Force

== Specifications (Saeqeh) ==

General characteristics

- Powerplant: 2 × Upgraded Iranian-built General Electric J85 afterburning turbojet engines (with technology from the Pratt & Whitney TF30)

Performance

== See also ==
Related development

- Northrop F-5
- HESA Azarakhsh
- HESA Kowsar

Aircraft of comparable role, configuration, and era

- Northrop F-20 Tigershark

Related lists

- List of aircraft of the Iranian Air Force
