= Unmanned aerial vehicles in the Iranian military =

In the mid-1980s, Iran became interested in unmanned aerial vehicles (UAVs). Iranians have since began manufacturing (UAVs). As an attack munition rather than intelligence, surveillance, or reconnaissance (ISR) platform, the first generation Ababil appears to have been deployed during the Iran–Iraq War. Iran's Shahed drones have been actively utilized by Russian forces in the Russo-Ukrainian war and by Iranian forces in the 2026 Iran war. In response to their effectiveness, Ukraine created its own analogs of the Shahed-136 in 2025 for long-range strikes. By December 2025, the U.S. military announced the development of the LUCAS drone, a clone of the Shahed 136, achieved through reverse engineering, and deployed a squadron in the Middle East.

== History ==
Iran first began using UAVs in 1985, with the Ababil-1 and Mohajer-1, which spied on Iraqi positions behind front-line trenches. In 1988, following Operation Praying Mantis where the US Navy inflicted heavy loses on Iran’s air and navy forces, Iranian strategists realized they could not openly face the US by water. It was then that Iran started investing heavily in drones. The Iranian government has since been open about its interest in UAVs. As well, Iran started manufacturing UAVs. The Islamic Revolutionary Guard Corps Aerospace Force is the primary operator of Iran’s growing fleet of UAVs, although most Iranian military services employ them.

Mohammad Bagheri in September 2016 announced the development of new long-range attack drones with the capability of precision bombing which was being shared with Russia.

Drones became a technology that Iranian engineers could develop locally as external markets closed due to sanctions or high prices.

On 29 July 2021 US sanctions were targeted at Iran's weapons program. While the US has previously sanctioned Iran's missile programs, the new penalties will target groups that supply parts for drones and missiles to Iran.

Also on 29 July 2021, a delta-wing drone, similar to unmanned "kamikaze" drones developed for the Islamic Revolutionary Guard Corps, flew into the pilothouse of the Merchant tanker Mercer Street in the July 2021 Gulf of Oman incident. It was reported that two crewmembers (a Romanian and UK national assigned to security) were killed. Later tests indicated that the UAV had been rigged to cause injury using a Nitrate-based explosive, RDX.

In October 2021 Iran unveiled its new Kaman 22 (UAV), which seems to be modeled on the U.S.-made MQ-1 Predator and with other features from the more advanced MQ-9 Reaper. The aircraft is also reminiscent of the Chinese CH-5 drone.

According to former U.S. Central Command chief Gen. Kenneth McKenzie, the U.S. is "for the first time since the Korean War operating without complete air superiority" due to threats posed by Iranian drones.

Issues with Iranian drones include a lack of access to modern components and parts, especially engines, lack of self-defense features for drones, problems with technical reliability, and poor weather.

Iran's Shahed drones have been used by Russian forces during the Russo-Ukrainian war and by Iranian forces during the 2026 Iran war. As a response to the effectiveness of the Shahed 136 drones, Ukraine developed its own Shahed-136 analogs in 2025 for long-range strikes. In December 2025, the U.S. military said that it had developed the LUCAS drone, a clone of the Shahed 136 developed from the reverse engineering of the Shahed 136, and deployed a squadron in the Middle East.

== List of Iranian military UAVs ==
Iran has several organizations that manufacture drones, amongst which are: Qods Aviation Industry Company, IAMCO and Shahed Aviation Industries.

- Ababeel UAV (swallow) Ababil-2 Ababeel-3 Ababeel-B Ababeel-S Ababeel-T
- Arash UAV / Arash-2
- Baaz UAV (falcon)
- Chabokpar UAV (light wing)
- Fotros UAV
- Hadaf-3000 (endeavor)
- Hamaseh UAV (epic)
- Hazem
- Kaman-12
- Kaman-19
- Kaman 22
- Karrar UAV
- Kian UAV / Kian-2
- Maine-Pakh-e-Faza 2
- Mohajer [Migrant]
- Mohajer-2 (migrant)
- Mohajer-3 (Dorna)
- Mohajer-4 (Hodhod)
- Mohajer-6
- Mohajer-10 (unveiled in August 2023)
- Naseh UAV
- Raad 85 UAV
- Saegheh UAV (Thunderbolt)
- Sarir UAV (meaning "Throne")
- Sejil UAV
- Shahed 121
- Shahed 129
- Shahed 131
- Shahed 136
- Shahed 149 Gaza
- Shaheen UAV (hawk)
- Simorgh UAV / Simorq / Simurgh
- Talash UAV / Tallash I (Endeavor) / Tallash II / Talash 2
- Tizpar UAV (speed-flier)
- Toofan UAV (tempest)
- Yasir UAV (expedient)

== See also ==
- Defense industry of Iran
