= Unmanned combat aerial vehicle =

Unmanned aerial vehicle that is usually armed

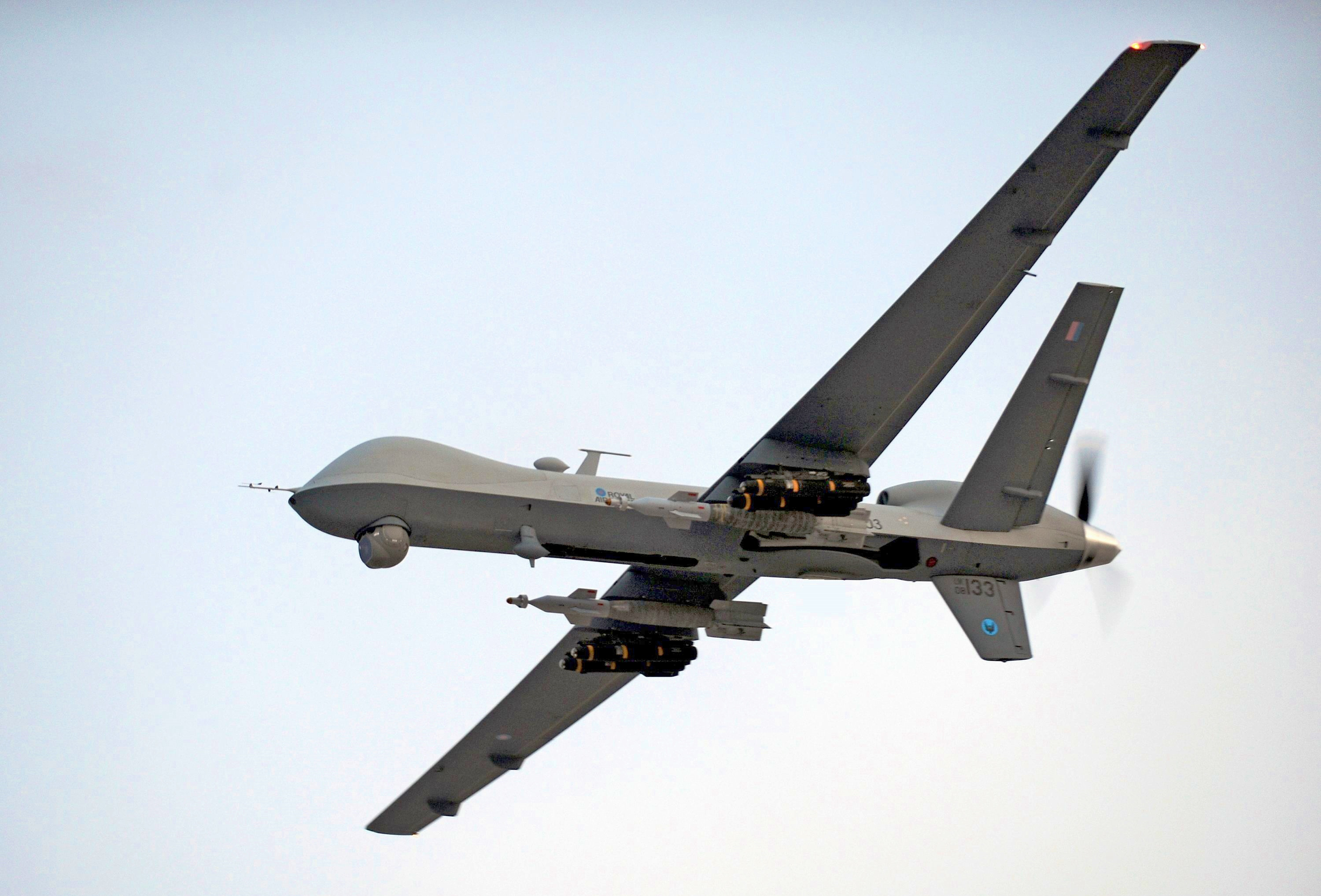
A British MQ-9A Reaper operating over Afghanistan in 2009 equipped with two GBU-12 Paveway laser-guided bombs and four AGM-114 Hellfire air-to-surface missiles.

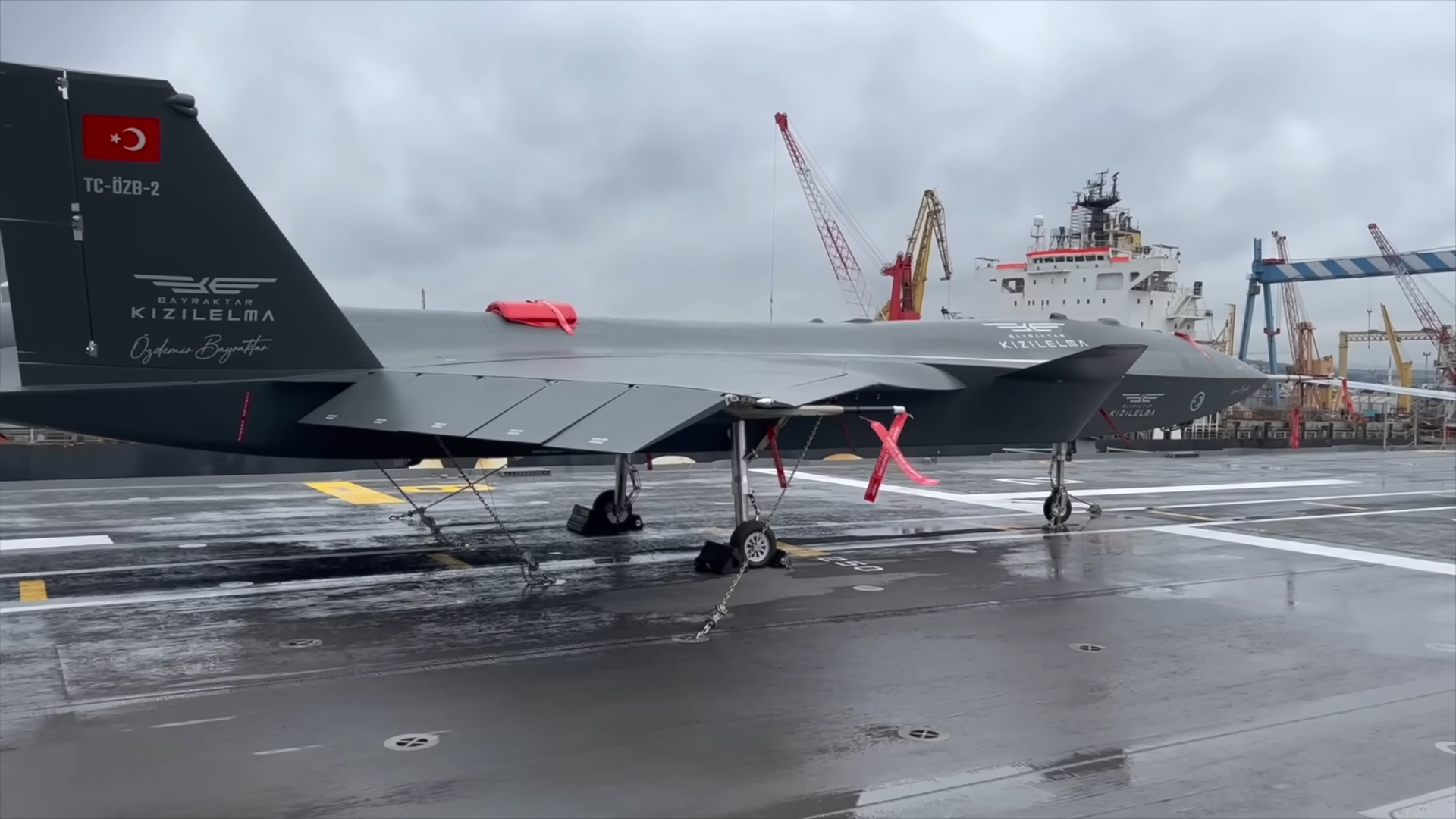
A Turkish Bayraktar Kızılelma unmanned fighter aircraft on the deck of drone carrier TCG Anadolu, the world's first UCAV to destroy an aerial target using a beyond-visual-range air-to-air missile.

An unmanned combat aerial vehicle (UCAV), also known as a combat drone, fighter drone or battlefield UAV, is an unmanned aerial vehicle (UAV) that carries aircraft ordnance such as air-to-surface missiles, anti-tank guided missiles (ATGMs), and/or aerial bombs on hardpoints or within weapons bay, allowing it to perform tactical attacks known as drone strikes. Advancements in Turkey’s and Australia’s UCAV programs have recently demonstrated some multi-role combat characteristics by combining beyond-visual-range air-to-air combat and ground-attack capabilities. UCAVs are used for intelligence, surveillance, target acquisition and reconnaissance, attacking high-value targets and prolonged loitering before needing to return to base, unlike loitering munitions and one-way attack drones, which are single-use drones made for physically ramming into a target and exploding on impact; or surveillance drones, which are unarmed drones used only for aerial reconnaissance and gathering intelligence. In March 2026 the British government indicated that it had aerial minesweeping drones and was considering deploying them in the strait of Hormuz.

Aircraft of this type have no onboard human pilot, but are usually under real-time remote control by human operators, with varying levels of automation. As the operator runs the vehicle from a remote terminal via radio control, equipment necessary to support an on-board human pilot is not needed, resulting in a lower weight and a smaller size than a manned aircraft for the same payload. Many countries have operational domestic UCAVs, and many more have imported fighter drones or are in the process of developing them.

Technological advancements are rapidly expanding the capabilities of UCAVs with a primary focus on enhanced autonomy and artificial intelligence (AI) integration. Several UCAVs can perform complex functions such as autonomous sensor fusion, real-time target identification, and dynamic mission re-planning reducing the cognitive load on human operators. This evolution is central to modern network-centric warfare as UCAVs seamlessly integrate into combined architectures. By sharing data across platforms from satellites to ground units they create a fused, comprehensive battlespace picture that enables dramatically faster decision cycles which is a critical advantage in modern strategy. A significant new doctrinal is embodied in the development of loyal wingman capable UCAVs, designed to operate in collaborative teams with manned fighter jets. These drones can perform high-risk missions like electronic attack, forward reconnaissance or weapons delivery thereby shielding human pilots and acting as force multipliers. As global militaries increasingly invest in and deploy unmanned systems an arms race in countermeasures is concurrently accelerating. This includes the development of advanced electronic warfare (EW) suites, directed-energy weapons and anti-drone systems to disrupt, deceive or destroy UCAVs. This arms race ensuring that the battlefield of the future will be defined by this competition between UCAV platforms and the measures designed to defeat them.

== History ==
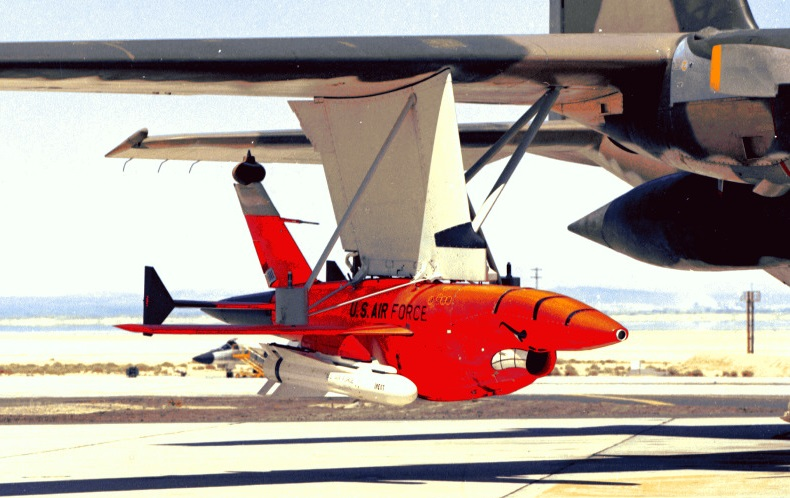
1972: Ryan Firebee with 2 Maverick missiles

=== First Attempts - 1940-1970 ===
One of the earliest explorations of the concept of the combat drone was pioneered by two men: Lee de Forest who was an inventor and developer of early radio controlled devices and U.A. Sanabria who was an electrical engineer in the emerging field of television and commercial broadcasting. Their idea for a radio-command vehicle was featured in an article in a 1940 publication of Popular Mechanics. The modern military drone was the brainchild of John Stuart Foster Jr., a nuclear physicist of Lawrence Livermore Laboratory. In 1971, Foster was a model airplane hobbyist and had the idea this hobby could be applied to building weapons. He drew up plans and by 1973 DARPA (Defense Advanced Research Projects Agency) built two prototypes called "Prairie" and "Calera". They were powered by a modified lawn-mower engine and could stay aloft for two hours while carrying a 28-pound (13 kg) load.

It should be noted, however, that the pioneers of military or combat UAV development were, in order, the United States, Israel, and Iran. The U.S. and Israel began developing combat drones in the 1970s, followed by Iran in the 1980s. The primary reason for this simultaneous development in the industry was that the United States, Iran, and Israel were strategic allies prior to 1979.

=== Israel - 1973-1982 ===
In the 1973 Yom Kippur War, Israel used unarmed U.S. Ryan Firebee target drones to spur Egypt into firing its entire arsenal of anti-aircraft missiles. This mission was accomplished with no injuries to Israeli pilots, who soon exploited the depleted Egyptian defences. In the late 1970s and 80s, Israel developed the Scout and the Pioneer, which represented a shift toward the modern lighter, glider-type model of UAV. Israel pioneered the use of unmanned aerial vehicles (UAVs) for real-time surveillance, electronic warfare, and decoys. The images and radar decoying provided by these UAVs helped Israel to completely neutralize the Syrian air defenses in Operation Mole Cricket 19 at the start of the 1982 Lebanon War, resulting in no pilots downed.

=== US and Iran - 1980-1991 ===
In the late 1980s, Iran deployed a drone armed with six RPG-7 rounds in the Iran–Iraq War.

Impressed by Israel's success, the US quickly acquired a number of UAVs, and its Hunter and Pioneer systems are direct derivatives of Israeli models. The first 'UAV war' was the first Persian Gulf War: according to a May 1991 Department of the Navy report: "At least one UAV was airborne at all times during Desert Storm." After the Persian Gulf War successfully demonstrated its utility, global militaries invested widely in the domestic development of combat UAVs.

=== Later development - 2000-2020 ===
The first "kill" by an American UAV was on October 7, 2001, in Kandahar.

Between 2004 and late 2012, the U.S. increased its use of drone strikes against targets in Pakistan and elsewhere as part of the war on terror. In January 2014, it was estimated that 2,400 people were killed by U.S. drone strikes in five years. In June 2015, the total death toll of U.S. drone strikes was estimated to exceed 6,000.

In 2020, Turkey became the first country to use UCAVs in a large, coordinated attack on a conventional battlefield when it attacked forces in Syria. They were used to attack enemy positions, to provide cover for ground forces and to scout for artillery. Drones were used extensively in the 2020 Nagorno-Karabakh war between Azerbaijan and Armenia. Azerbaijan's use of cheaper Turkish TB2 drones was seen as crucial to their victory against the Armenian forces.

=== Ukraine and Russia - 2022 onwards ===
During the Russo-Ukrainian war, use of Russian drones (unmanned aerial vehicles) increased about tenfold from early 2024 through summer 2025.

D1L-Duck drone

Drones were also used extensively during the Russo-Ukrainian war. The war was widely described as the first full-scale war featuring the large-scale use of small and commercial-grade UAVs in military settings. Consumer quadcopters and first-person view (FPV) drones, modified with sensors and explosives, were being used for military missions. The affordability and availability of small UAVs have shifted modern warfare and given rise to new offensive and defensive strategies. Usage of small combat drones offers a cost advantage, and their high performance, reliability, and commercial availability for repair parts also contributed to their popularity.

== By country ==
=== China ===
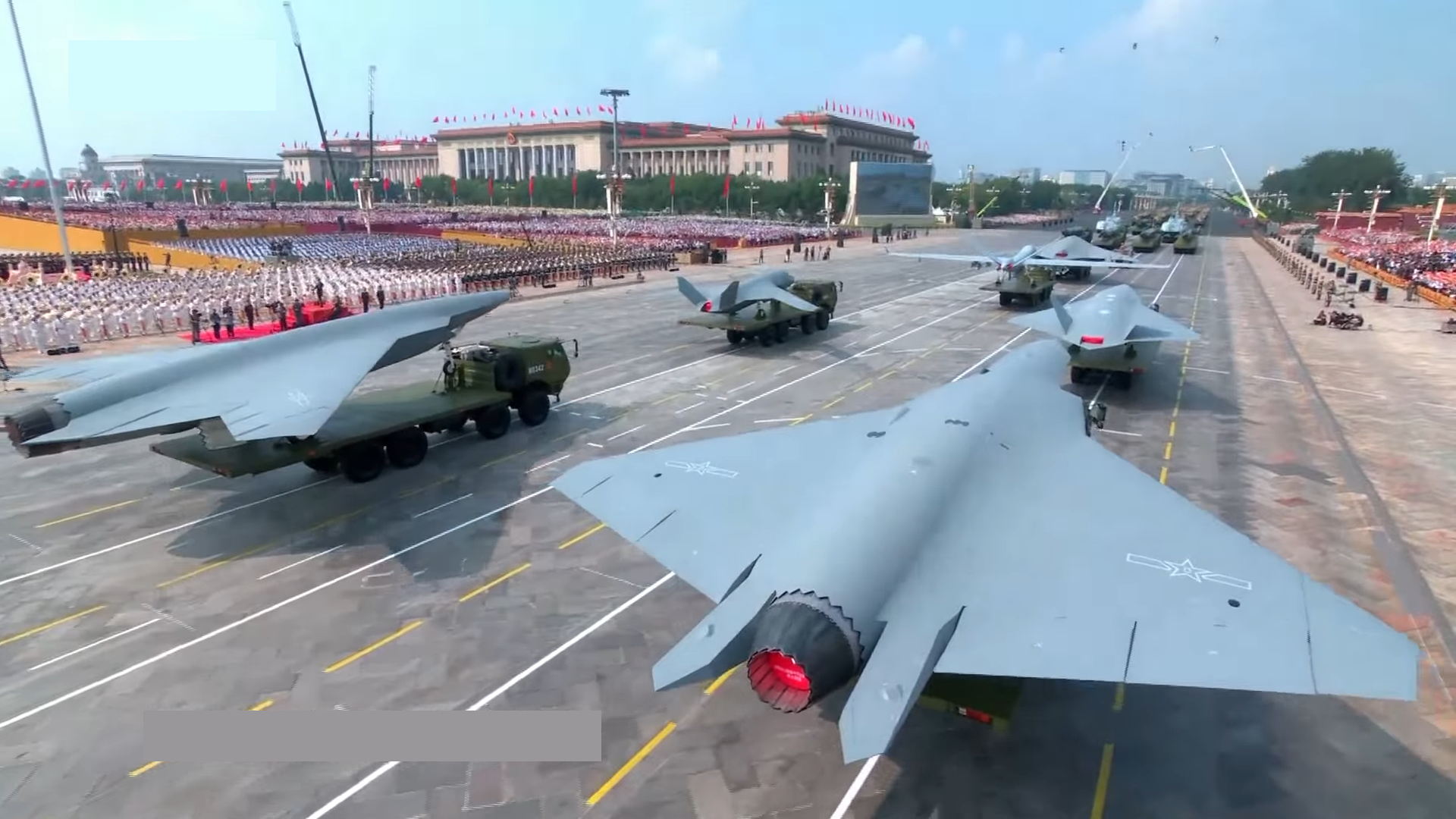
UCAVs at 2025 China Victory Day Parade

China manufactures and exports combat drones on a large scale, and the country is the source of most commercial UAV components. The People's Liberation Army military operates multiple types of unmanned combat aerial vehicles. Since 2010, Chinese drone companies have begun to export large quantities of drones to the global military market. Of the 18 countries that are known to have received military drones between 2010 and 2019, the top 12 all purchased their drones from China. The shift accelerated in the 2020s due to China's advancement in drone technologies and manufacturing, compounded by market demand from the Russian invasion of Ukraine and the Israel-Gaza conflict. Chinese companies that manufactures military unmanned aerial vehicles include China Aerospace Science and Technology Corporation (CASC) and Chengdu Aircraft Industry Group, etc.

China is known to be developing various "loyal wingman" UCAVs, such as AVIC Dark Sword, which is a concept first revealed in 2006. Stealth UCAV, such as Hongdu GJ-11 unmanned combat aerial vehicles, are designed to be controlled by the Chengdu J-20 fighter, forming manned-unmanned aircraft teams. Other stealth UCAVs include Feihong FH-97 UCAV developed by China Aerospace Science and Technology Corporation (CASC). It was designed to suppress air defenses with electronic countermeasures, fly ahead of aircraft to provide early warning, act as an expandable decoy, as well as provide reconnaissance and damage evaluation. Feihong FH-97A, a loyal wingman drone designed to fly alongside the fighter aircraft.

In August and September 2025, China unveiled multiple different types of UCAV and loyal wingmen prototype under development, and the naval variant of the Hongdu GJ-11 UCAV. These Chinese UCAV designs have different wing configurations and engine options, with some large UCAVs aimed to perform air superiority mission independently or collaboratively with manned aircraft.

In 2025, the first pictures of two very large stealthy long range drones appeared. They have been unofficially designated as the “WZ-X” and “GJ-X”.

=== Israel ===
==== Elbit Hermes 450 ====
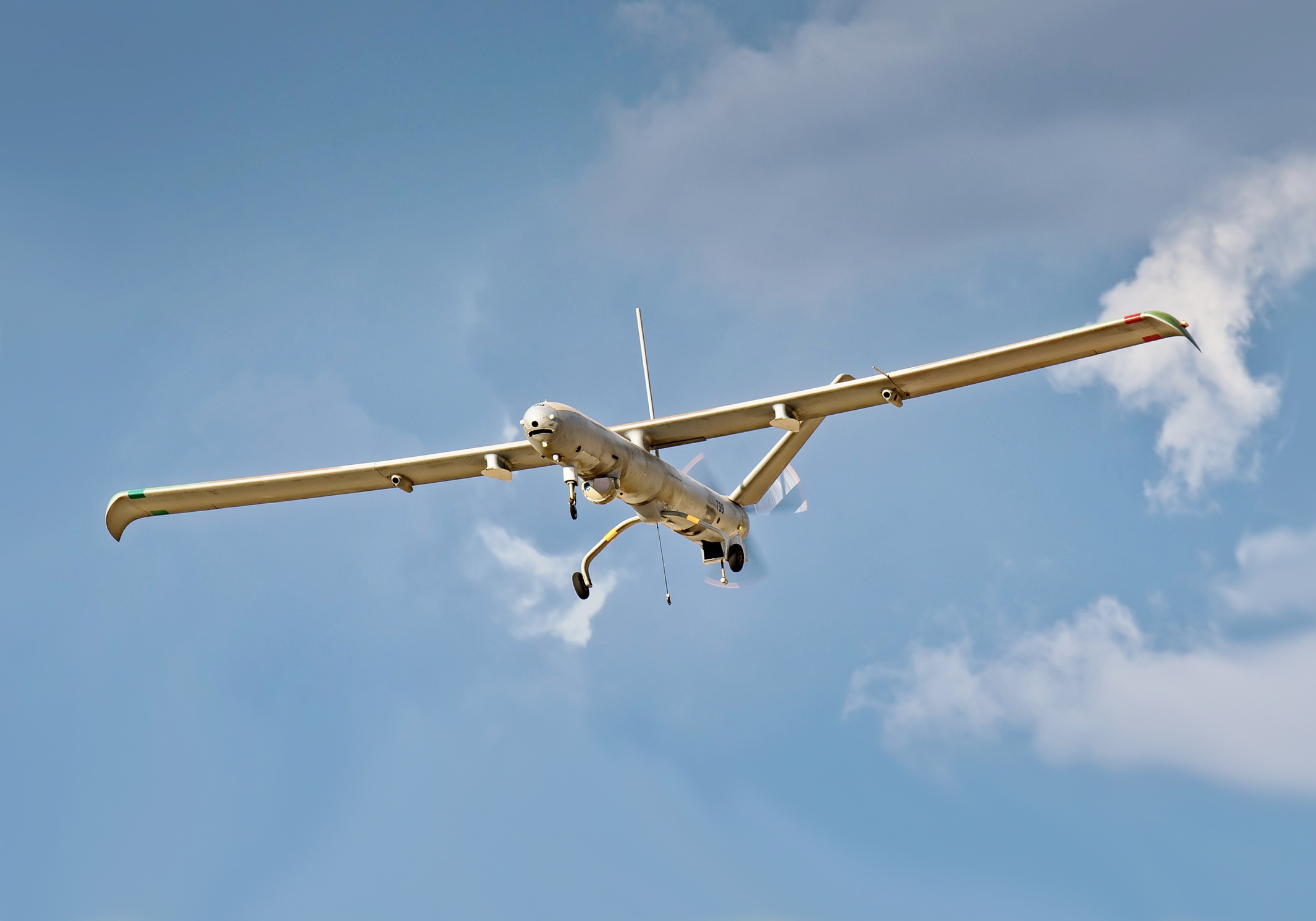
An IAF Hermes 450 from 200 Squadron

The Israeli Air Force, which operates a squadron of Hermes 450s out of Palmachim Airbase south of Tel Aviv, has adapted the Hermes 450 for use as an assault UAV, reportedly equipping it with two Hellfire missiles or, according to various sources, two Rafael-made missiles. According to Israeli, Palestinian, Lebanese, and independent reports, the Israeli assault UAV has been used in the Gaza Strip and was used intensively in the Second Lebanon War. Israel has not denied this capability, but to date, its policy has been to not officially confirm it either.

=== Turkey ===
==== TAI Anka-3 ====
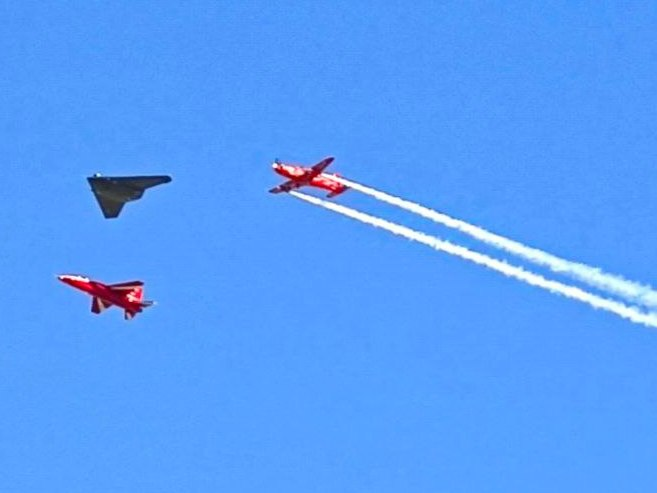
A TAI Anka-3 (center) performing manned-unmanned teaming with manned aircraft TAI Hürjet (left) and a TAI Hürkuş (right) in 2024

TAI Anka 3 is the code-name for the new single engine UCAV being developed by TAI. It will have a flying wing form, and will feature low-observable stealth technology. The role of the aircraft will be suppression of enemy air defenses (SEAD), penetration and bomber.

==== TAI Aksungur ====
TAI Aksungur is a built by Turkish Aerospace Industries (TAI) for the Turkish Armed Forces. Using existing technology from the TAI Anka series of drones, it is the manufacturer's largest drone, with payload capacity for mission-specific equipment. It is intended to be used for long-term surveillance, signals intelligence, maritime patrol missions, or as an UCAV. The first unit was delivered to the Turkish Naval Forces on 20 October 2021.

==== Bayraktar Kizilelma ====
Bayraktar Kızılelma is a proposed jet-powered, single-engine, low-observable, supersonic, carrier-capable unmanned combat aircraft in development by Baykar, famous for its Bayraktar TB2. On 12 March 2022, Selçuk Bayraktar, CTO of Baykar announced that the first prototype of the Bayraktar Kızılelma has entered the production line. On November 30, 2025, the Bayraktar Kızılelma successfully completed a landmark flight and firing test campaign, achieving a global first among Unmanned Combat Aerial Vehicles (UCAVs). The platform successfully launched Gökdoğan, a Beyond-Visual-Range (BVR) air-to-air missile, which is equipped with an active radar seeker head, utilizing the autonomous guidance capabilities of its own integrated MURAD AESA Radar system. With this unparalleled operational demonstration, the Kızılelma has officially secured its position as the world's first unmanned fighter jet to validate this critical BVR engagement capability on a fully autonomous platform.

=== United Kingdom ===
==== BAE Systems Taranis ====
Taranis is a British demonstrator program for unmanned combat air vehicle (UCAV) technology. It is part of the UK's Strategic Unmanned Air Vehicle (Experimental) (SUAV[E]) program. BAE describes Taranis's role in this context as following: "This £124m, four -year programme is part of the UK Government's Strategic Unmanned Air Vehicle Experiment (SUAVE) and will result in a UCAV demonstrator with fully integrated autonomous systems and low observable features."

The Taranis demonstrator will have an MTOW (Maximum Takeoff Weight) of about 8000 kilograms and be of comparable size to the BAE Hawk – making it one of the world's largest UAVs. It will be stealthy, fast, and able to deploy a range of munitions over a number of targets, as well as being capable of defending itself against manned and other unmanned enemy aircraft. The first steel was cut in September 2007 and ground testing started in early 2009. The first flight of the Taranis took place in August 2013 in Woomera, Australia. The demonstrator will have two internal weapons bays. With the inclusion of "full autonomy" the intention is thus for this platform to be able to "think for itself" for a large part of the mission.

=== United States ===
==== J-UCAS ====
- Boeing X-45 UCAV (TD)
- Northrop-Grumman X-47 Pegasus

Joint Unmanned Combat Air Systems, or J-UCAS, was the name for the joint U.S. Navy/U.S. Air Force unmanned combat air vehicle procurement project. J-UCAS was managed by DARPA, the Defense Advanced Research Projects Agency. In the 2006 Quadrennial Defense Review, the J-UCAS program was terminated. The program would have used stealth technologies and allowed UCAVs to be armed with precision-guided weapons such as Joint Direct Attack Munition (JDAM) or precision miniature munitions, such as the Small-Diameter Bomb, which are used to suppress enemy air defenses. Controllers could have used real-time data sources, including satellites, to plan for and respond to changes on and around the battlefield.

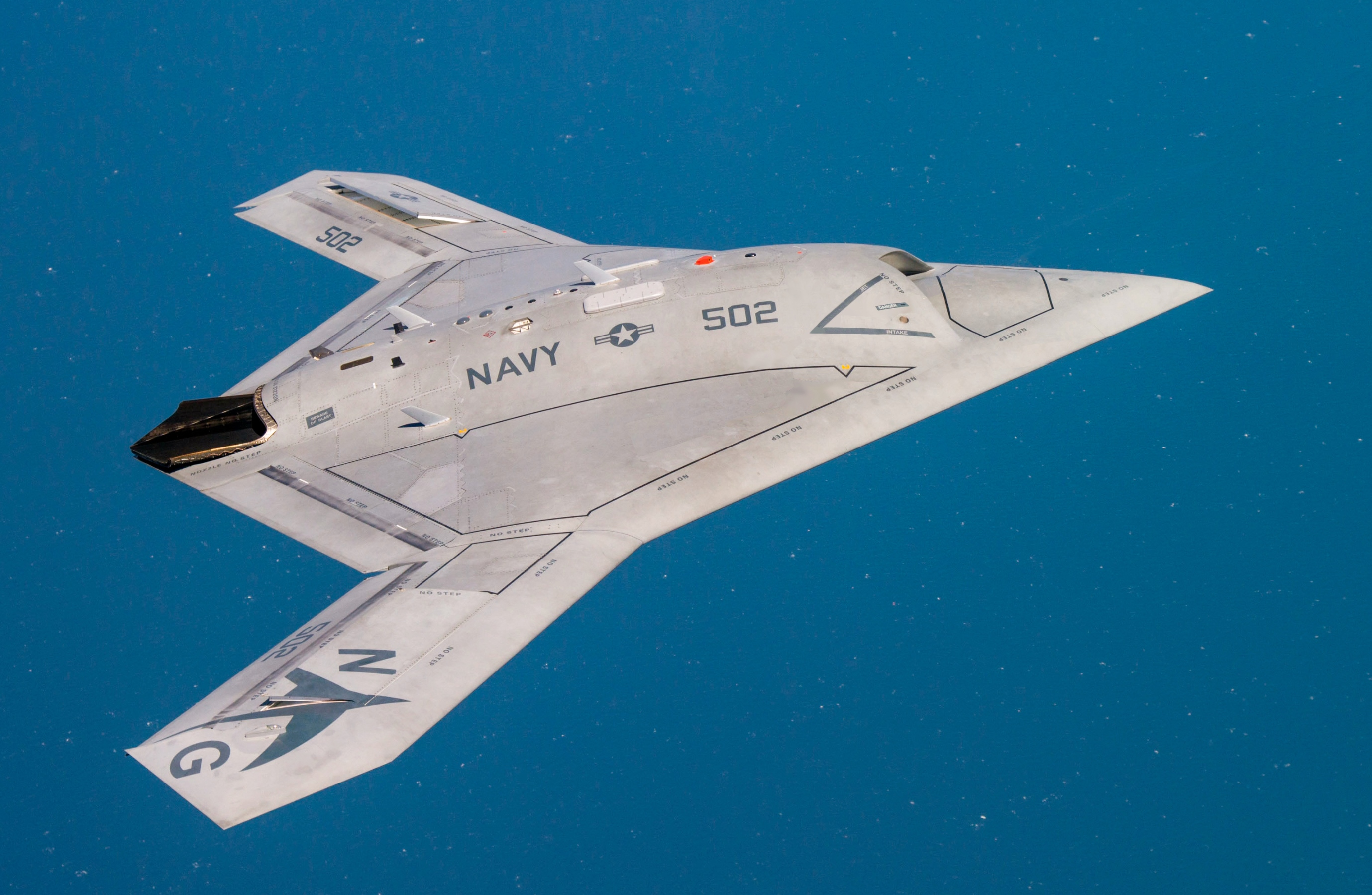
A X-47B UCAV technology demonstrator

The program was later revitalized into UCAS-D, a United States Navy program designed to develop a carrier-based unmanned aircraft.

==== N-UCAS ====
UCAS-D and Northrop Grumman X-47B are the U.S. Navy-only successors to the J-UCAS, which was canceled in 2006. Boeing is also working on the X-45N in this sector.

In a New Year 2011 editorial titled "China's Naval Ambitions", The New York Times editorial board argued that "[t]he Pentagon must accelerate efforts to make American naval forces in Asia less vulnerable to Chinese missile threats by giving them the means to project their deterrent power from further offshore. Cutting back purchases of the Navy's DDG-1000 destroyer (with its deficient missile defense system) was a first step. A bigger one would be to reduce the Navy's reliance on short-range manned strike aircraft like the F-18 and the F-35, in favor of the carrier-launched N-UCAS ...."

On 6 January 2011, the DOD announced that this would be one area of additional investment in the 2012 budget request.

==== USAF Hunter-Killer ====
- Scaled Composites Model 395
- Scaled Composites Model 396
- General Atomics MQ-9 Reaper (originally the Predator B)
- Aurora Flight Sciences/Israel Aircraft Industries Eagle/Heron 2
- Unnamed Lockheed Martin entry

The United States Air Force has shifted its UCAV program from medium-range tactical strike aircraft to long-range strategic bombers. The technology of the Long Range Strike program is based on the Lockheed Martin Polecat demonstrator.

=== Multinational ===
- EADS Surveyor: The EADS "Surveyor" is still in preliminary investigation phase. It will be a fixed-wing, jet-powered UAV and is being positioned as a replacement for the CL-289. EADS is currently working on a demonstrator, the "Carapas", modified from an Italian Mirach 100 drone. The production Surveyor would be a stealthy machine with a top speed of 850 km/h (530 mph), an endurance of up to three hours, and capable of carrying a sophisticated sensor payload, including SIGINT gear. It would also be able to carry external loads, such as air-dropped sensors or light munitions.

=== Non-state actors ===
In the mid-2010s, the Islamic State terrorist group began attaching explosives to commercially available quadcopters such as the Chinese-made DJI Phantom to bomb military targets in Iraq and Syria. During the 2016–17 battle of Mosul, the Islamic State reportedly used drones as surveillance and weapons delivery platforms, using improvised cradles to drop grenades and other explosives. An Islamic State drone facility was notably targeted by Royal Air Force strike aircraft during the battle.

Militant groups during the Syrian civil war have also reportedly used UAVs in attacks, one example being a swarm of drones armed with bombs attacking Russian bases in western Syria in early January 2018.

Starting in the 2020s, Mexican drug cartels began dropping reportedly hundreds of drone-carried bombs targeting both security forces and enemy gangs during turf wars.

== Safety and security ==
=== Counter-UAS ===
There has been widespread use of drones in the Russo-Ukrainian War. Ukrainian soldiers use GPS signals to guide a drone to find Russian artillery and to guide Ukrainian artillery. Jamming these drone GPS signals cause drones to operate less effectively, as the operators of drones have to rely on pre-programmed routes through areas of jamming until communications can be restored. Other systems supplied by the West rely on automation. Systems like the AeroVironment Switchblade can find targets autonomously, requiring human permission only to engage found targets. In October 2022 a video appeared on the web showing two drones colliding and one being rendered unflyable as a result. It was claimed that the filming drone was Ukrainian and the one destroyed was Russian. If this is the case it would be the first recorded case of drone on drone combat.

On 27 December 2022 North Korea sent five drones over its border with South Korea. One reaching Seoul, all five returned to the North, despite a five-hour chase involving fighter jets and attack helicopters with some 100 rounds being fired. A South Korean KAI KT-1 Woongbi crashed although both crew survived. The Joint Chiefs of Staff (South Korea) released a statement in which it said that while it can stop attack drones, its ability to stop smaller spy drones is "limited". A senior official, Kang Shin-chul, said: "Our military's lack of preparedness has caused a lot of concern to the people…actively employ detection devices to spot the enemy's drone from an early stage and aggressively deploy strike assets". The South Korean President Yoon Suk-yeol has indicated that South Korea will invest in stealthy drones that could penetrate North Korea, with the creation of a new military unit.

The South Korean Defence Ministry announced a new series of anti-drone measures, planning to spend some 560 billion won over the next five years. The money will go towards four new initiatives. One is an airborne laser that will be used to destroy larger drones, whilst a jammer would be used on smaller drones. A new counter drone unit, made up of two squadrons, would also be created. The laser is already in the test phase and is expected to become operational in 2027. The jamming system has been described as "soft kill".

== Ethics and laws ==
=== Civilian casualties ===
==== Israel ====
In March 2009, The Guardian reported allegations that Israeli UAVs armed with missiles killed 48 Palestinian civilians in the Gaza Strip, including two small children in a field and a group of women and girls in an otherwise empty street. In June, Human Rights Watch investigated six UAV attacks that were reported to have resulted in civilian casualties and alleged that Israeli forces either failed to take all feasible precautions to verify that the targets were combatants or failed to distinguish between combatants and civilians.

Hamas used drones in its terror attack on Israel of Oct. 7, 2023.

==== United States ====
Collateral damage of civilians still takes place with drone combat, although some (like John O. Brennan) have argued that it greatly reduces the likelihood. Although drones enable advanced tactical surveillance and up-to-the-minute data, flaws can become apparent. The U.S. drone program in Pakistan has killed several dozen civilians accidentally. An example is the operation in February 2010 near Khod, in Uruzgan Province, Afghanistan. Over ten civilians in a three-vehicle convoy travelling from Daykundi Province were accidentally killed after a drone crew misidentified the civilians as hostile threats. A force of Bell OH-58 Kiowa helicopters, who were attempting to protect ground troops fighting several kilometers away, fired AGM-114 Hellfire missiles at the vehicles.

In 2009, the Brookings Institution reported that in the US-led drone attacks in Pakistan, ten civilians died for every militant killed. A former ambassador of Pakistan said that American UAV attacks were turning Pakistani opinion against the United States. The website PakistanBodyCount.Org reported 1,065 civilian deaths between 2004 and 2010. According to a 2010 analysis by the New America Foundation 114 UAV-based missile strikes in northwest Pakistan from 2004 killed between 830 and 1,210 individuals, around 550 to 850 of whom were militants. In October 2013, the Pakistani government revealed that since 2008 317 drone strikes had killed 2,160 Islamic militants and 67 civilians – far less than previous government and independent organization calculations.

In July 2013, former Pentagon lawyer Jeh Johnson said, on a panel at the Aspen Institute's Security Forum, that he felt an emotional reaction upon reading Nasser al-Awlaki's account of how his 16-year-old grandson was killed by a U.S. drone.

In December 2013, a U.S. drone strike in Radda, capital of Yemen's Bayda province, killed members of a wedding party. The following February, Human Rights Watch published a 28-page report reviewing the strike and its legality, among other things. Titled "A Wedding That Became A Funeral", the report concludes that some (but not necessarily all) of the casualties were civilians, not the intended regional Al-Qaeda targets. The organization demanded US and Yemeni investigations into the attack. In its research, HRW "found no evidence that the individuals taking part in the wedding procession posed an imminent threat to life. In the absence of an armed conflict, killing them would be a violation of international human rights law."

=== Political effects ===
As a new weapon, drones are having unforeseen political effects. Some scholars have argued that the extensive use of drones will undermine the popular legitimacy of local governments, which are blamed for permitting the strikes.

On August 6, 2020, U.S. Senators Rand Paul (R-KY), Mike Lee (R-UT), Chris Murphy (D-CT), Chris Coons (D-DE), and Bernie Sanders (I-VT) introduced a bill to ban sales, transfers, and exports of large armed drones to countries outside of NATO amid concerns that civilians were killed with American-made weapons used by Saudi Arabia and the UAE during the Saudi Arabian-led intervention in Yemen. Congress had previously passed a similar measure with bipartisan support, but failed to overcome President Donald Trump's veto.

=== Psychological effects ===
Controllers can also experience psychological stress from the combat they are involved in. A few may even experience posttraumatic stress disorder (PTSD). There are some reports of drone pilots struggling with post traumatic stress disorder after they have killed civilians, especially children. Unlike bomber pilots, moreover, drone operators linger long after the explosives strike and see its effects on human bodies in stark detail. The intense training that US drone operators undergo "works to dehumanise the 'enemy' people below whilst glorifying and celebrating the killing process."

Professor Shannon E. French, the director of the Center for Ethics and Excellence at Case Western Reserve University and a former professor at the U.S. Naval Academy, wonders if the PTSD may be rooted in a suspicion that something else was at stake. According to Professor French, the author of the 2003 book The Code of the Warrior:

If [I'm] in the field risking and taking a life, there's a sense that I'm putting skin in the game ... I'm taking a risk so it feels more honorable. Someone who kills at a distance—it can make them doubt. Am I truly honorable?

The Missile Technology Control Regime applies to UCAVs.

On 28 October 2009, United Nations Special Rapporteur on extrajudicial, summary or arbitrary executions, Philip Alston, presented a report to the Third Committee (social, humanitarian and cultural) of the General Assembly arguing that the use of unmanned combat air vehicles for targeted killings should be regarded as a breach of international law unless the United States can demonstrate appropriate precautions and accountability mechanisms are in place.

In June 2015, forty-five former US military personnel issued a joint appeal to pilots of aerial drones operating in Afghanistan, Iraq, Syria, Pakistan and elsewhere urging them to refuse to fly and indicated that their missions "profoundly violate domestic and international laws." They noted that these drone attacks also undermine principles of human rights.

Stanford's ‘Living Under Drones’ researchers, meanwhile, have shown that civilians in Pakistan and Afghanistan are reluctant to help those hit by the first strikes because rescuers themselves have often been killed by follow-on drone strikes. Injured relatives in the rubble of the first strike have been known to tell their relatives not to help rescue them because of the frequency of these so-called ‘double-tap’ strikes. People also avoid gathering in groups in visible places. Many children are permanently kept indoors and often no longer attend school.

Writer Mark Bowden has disputed this viewpoint, saying in his The Atlantic article, "But flying a drone, [the pilot] sees the carnage close-up, in real time—the blood and severed body parts, the arrival of emergency responders, the anguish of friends and family. Often, he’s been watching the people he kills for a long time before pulling the trigger. Drone pilots become familiar with their victims. They see them in the ordinary rhythms of their lives—with their wives and friends, with their children. War by remote control turns out to be intimate and disturbing. Pilots are sometimes shaken."

This assessment is corroborated by a sensor operator's account:

The smoke clears, and there are pieces of the two guys around the crater. And there’s this guy over here, and he’s missing his right leg above his knee. He’s holding it, and he’s rolling around, and the blood is squirting out of his leg … It took him a long time to die. I just watched him.

— Airman First Class Brandon Bryant (whistleblower) in GQ

Back in the United States, a combination of "lower-class" status in the military, overwork, and psychological trauma may be taking a mental toll on drone pilots. These psychological, cultural and career issues appear to have led to a shortfall in USAF drone operators, which is seen as a "dead end job".

=== Stand-off attacks ===
The "unmanned" aspect of armed UAVs has raised moral concerns about their use in combat and law enforcement contexts. Attacking humans with remote-controlled machines is even more abstract than the use of other "stand-off" weaponry, such as missiles, artillery, and aerial bombardment, possibly depersonalizing the decision to attack. By contrast, UAVs and other stand-off systems reduce casualties among the attackers.

=== Wrongful targeting ===
There are only estimates of the magnitude of the errors in target selection. However, they do occur, and some of them become known.

One fatal "error" happened in December 2023, when the Nigerian army accidentally hit a village in northwestern Nigeria, killing 85 civilians celebrating a Muslim festival. The army said they thought the people were rebels.

=== Autonomous attacks ===
The picture is further complicated if the UAV can initiate an attack autonomously, without direct human involvement. Such UAVs could possibly react more quickly and without bias, but would lack human sensibility. Heather Roff replies that lethal autonomous robots (LARs) may not be appropriate for complex conflicts and targeted populations would likely react angrily against them. Will McCants argues that the public would be more outraged by machine failures than human error, making LARs politically implausible. According to Mark Gubrud, claims that drones can be hacked are overblown and misleading and moreover, drones are more likely to be hacked if they're autonomous, because otherwise the human operator would take control: "Giving weapon systems autonomous capabilities is a good way to lose control of them, either due to a programming error, unanticipated circumstances, malfunction, or hack and then not be able to regain control short of blowing them up, hopefully before they've blown up too many other things and people." Others have argued that the technological possibility of autonomy should not obscure the continuing moral responsibilities humans have at every stage. There is an ongoing debate as to whether the attribution of moral responsibility can be apportioned appropriately under existing international humanitarian law, which is based on four principles: military necessity, distinction between military and civilian objects, prohibition of unnecessary suffering, and proportionality.

=== International regulation ===
Under the framework of the Convention on Certain Conventional Weapons, states have discussed lethal autonomous weapon systems since 2014. In 2016, the treaty's states parties established an open-ended Group of Governmental Experts on Lethal Autonomous Weapons Systems to continue those discussions. The discussions have addressed international humanitarian law, accountability, possible prohibitions and regulations, and the extent of human control required over AI-enabled weapons.

== Public opinion ==
In 2013, a Fairleigh Dickinson University poll asked registered voters whether they "approve or disapprove of the U.S. military using drones to carry out attacks abroad on people and other targets deemed a threat to the U.S.?" The results showed that three in every four voters (75%) approved of the U.S. military using drones to carry out attacks, while (13%) disapproved. A poll conducted by the Huffington Post in 2013 also showed a majority supporting targeted killings using drones, though by a smaller margin. A 2015 poll showed Republicans and men are more likely to support U.S. drone strikes, while Democrats, independents, women, young people, and minorities are less supportive.

Outside America, there is widespread opposition to US drone killings. A July 2014 report found a majority or plurality of respondents in 39 of 44 countries surveyed opposed U.S. drone strikes in countries such as Pakistan, Yemen, and Somalia. The U.S., Kenya, and Israel were the only countries where at least half the population supported drone strikes. Venezuela was found to be the most anti-drone country, where 92% of respondents disagreed with U.S. drone strikes, followed closely by Jordan, where 90% disagreed; Israel was shown as the most pro-drone, with 65% in favor of U.S. drone strikes and 27% opposed.

The drone strikes conducted by the Malian army have had devastating consequences on the civilian population in the Azawad region. In March 2024, attacks killed 13 civilians, including seven children, in Amasrakad, Gao region, sparking outrage and calls for justice from organizations like Amnesty International. These incidents highlighted the lack of transparency and accountability in drone use, exacerbating local and international tensions.’

== List of aircraft ==
=== Operational ===
Below are a list of some current dedicated armed UAV's:

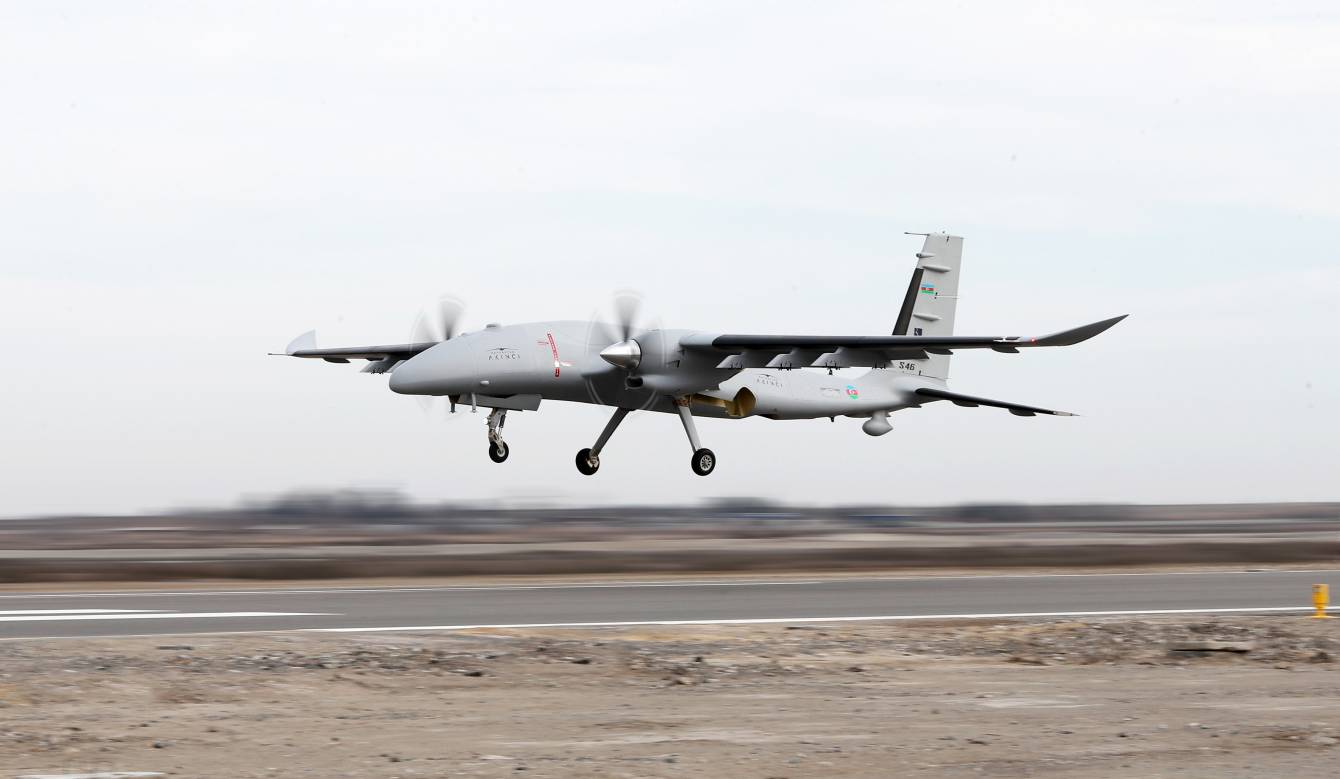
A Turkish made Azerbaijani Baykar Bayraktar Akinci over the runway

Country	Manufacturer	Aircraft	Introduced
United States	General Atomics	MQ-1 Predator	1995
United States	General Atomics	MQ-9 Reaper	2007
United States	General Atomics	MQ-1C Gray Eagle	2009
United States	General Atomics	General Atomics MQ-20 Avenger	2009
China	Chengdu Aerospace	CAIG Wing Loong	2011
China	Chengdu Aerospace	CAIG Wing Loong-10	2016
China	Chengdu Aerospace	CAIG Wing Loong II	2017
China	Chengdu Aerospace	Wing Loong-III	2022
China	Harbin Aircraft Industry Group	Harbin BZK-005	2006
China	Hongdu Aerospace	Hongdu GJ-11	2019
China	Sichuan Tengden	Tengden TB-001	2017
Turkey	Turkish Aerospace Industries	TAI Anka	2010
Turkey	Baykar Defense	Bayraktar TB2	2014
Turkey	Turkish Aerospace Industries	TAI Aksungur	2019
Turkey	Baykar Defense	Bayraktar Akıncı	2021
Turkey	Turkish Aerospace Industries	TAI Anka-3	2023
Turkey	Baykar Defense	Bayraktar TB3	2023
Pakistan	NESCOM	NESCOM Burraq	2016
Pakistan	GIDS	GIDS Shahpar-2	2021
India	DRDO	DRDO Ghatak	2023
Iran	Qods Aviation	Qods Mohajer-6	2017
Iran	Qods Aviation	Qods Mohajer-10	2023
Iran	HESA	HESA Shahed-129	2012
Iran	HESA	HESA Shahed-149 Gaza	2022
Iran	HESA	HESA Shahed 191 Saegheh	2010
Iran	IRIAF	Kaman 22	2021
Iran	HESA	Shahed 171 Simorgh	2010
Italy	Leonardo-Finmeccanica	Astore	2023
Russia	Kronshtadt group	Kronshtadt Orion	2020
Russia	Sukhoi	Sukhoi S-70	2024
Russia	OKB Luch	Luch Korsar	2018
Russia	Ural Civil Aviation Plant	Sokol Altius	2021
South Africa	Milkor	Milkor 380	2023
Israel	Elbit Systems	Hermes-900	2010
Israel	Elbit Systems	Hermes-450	1998
Israel	Elbit Systems	Hermes-650	2024
Israel	IAI	Eitan	2007
North Korea	Korean People's Army Air Force	Saetbyol-9	2022
Serbia	Utva Aviation Industry	Pegaz	2025

Some reconnaissance drones that have armed capability include the CASC CH-92, IAI Eitan and the Ababil-3, Ababil-5, Hamaseh. Some commercial drones, such as DJI Mavic and Phantom, have been modified to carry light explosives for combat missions in recent wars.

=== In development ===
Below is a table of some technology demonstrators and projects in development:

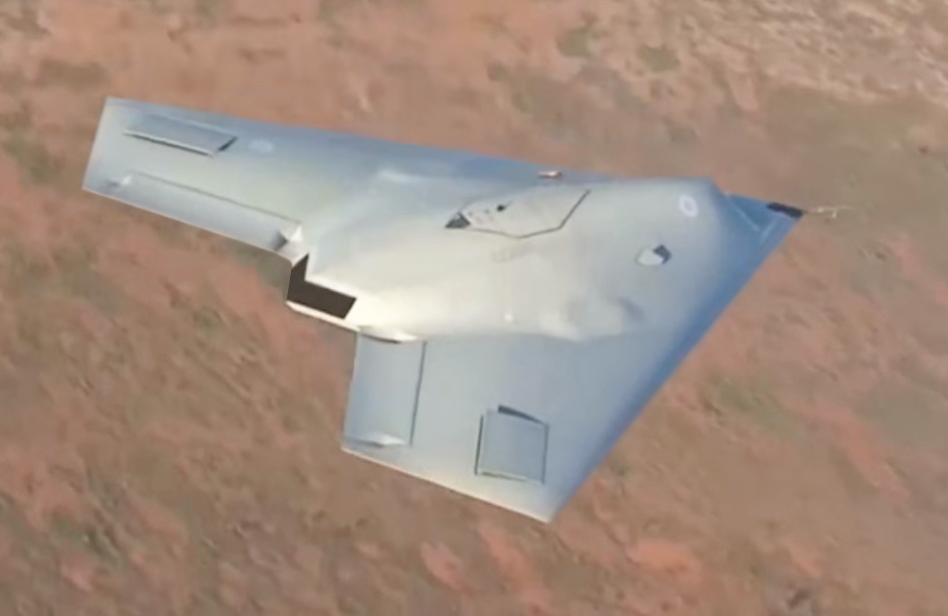
The BAE Taranis model is one of the larger designs

Aircraft	Country	Notes
Boeing MQ-28 Ghost Bat	Australia	Made by Boeing Australia. Under flight testing/development.
AVIC Dark Sword	China	Technology demonstrator/testing
MD-22	China	Hypersonic UCAV, Under development
FL-71	China	Supersonic stealth UCAV, Under development
BAE Systems Corax	United Kingdom	Technology demonstrator
BAE Systems Taranis	United Kingdom	Technology demonstrator
Boeing Phantom Ray	United States	Under development/testing
Dassault nEUROn	France	Experimental stealth UCAV
DRDO Archer-NG	India	Under development
Eurodrone	EU	Under development
EMC Operations Anaconda	United Kingdom	Under development/testing
HAL CATS Warrior	India	Under development
Kratos XQ-58 Valkyrie	United States	Under development/testing
General Atomics YFQ-42 Dark Merlin	United States	Under development
Anduril YFQ-44	United States	Under development
Lockheed Martin Vectis	United States	Under development
Northrop Grumman X-47A	United States	Technology demonstrator inc. X-47B / C variants
Bayraktar Kızılelma	Turkey	Under development/testing
TAI Anka-3	Turkey	Under development/testing
Atobá XR	Brazil	Under development/testing
S-70 Okhotnik-B	Russia	Under development/testing
IAIO Qaher-313	Iran	Under development/testing
Qods Mohajer-7	Iran	Under development
Qods Mohajer-9	Iran	Under development
Indonesian Aerospace Elang Hitam	Indonesia	Under development

== Users ==
Countries with known operational armed drones:

- Albania – Bayraktar TB2
- Algeria – TAI Anka, TAI Aksungur
- Azerbaijan – Bayraktar TB2
- Bangladesh – Bayraktar TB2
- Brazil – Elbit Hermes 450, Elbit Hermes 900
- Burkina Faso – Bayraktar TB2
- China – GJ-11, CAIG Wing Loong I, CAIG Loong II, CAIG Wing Loong III, CH-4, TB-001, WZ-10
- Chad – TAI Anka
- Djibouti – Bayraktar TB2
- Egypt – CAIG Wing Loong, CH-4 Rainbow
- Ethiopia – Bayraktar TB2, CAIG Wing Loong, Mohajer-6
- France – MQ-9 Reaper
- India – IAI Heron, MQ-9B
- Iraq – CH-4 Rainbow, Mohajer-4, Mohajer-6, Ababil-3
- Iran – Hamaseh, Saegheh, Kaman-12, Kaman 22, IAIO Fotros, Shahed 129, Meraj, HESA Ababil, Mohajer-4, Mohajer-6, Mohajer-10, Shahed 149 Gaza, Shahed Saegheh, Shahed 171 Simorgh
- Israel – Elbit Hermes 450, Elbit Hermes 900 (armed variant), IAI Eitan
- Italy – MQ-1 Predator, MQ-9 Reaper
- Kazakhstan – TAI Anka
- Kosovo – Bayraktar TB2
- Kyrgyzstan – TAI Anka, TAI Aksungur, Bayraktar TB2, Bayraktar Akıncı
- Libya – Bayraktar TB2 (used by GNA) / CAIG Wing Loong II (used by LNA)
- Malaysia – TAI Anka
- Maldives –Bayraktar TB2
- Morocco – MQ-9 Reaper, Bayraktar TB2, CAIG Wing Loong
- Myanmar – CH-3A Rainbow, CH-4 Rainbow
- Netherlands – MQ-9 Reaper
- Niger – Bayraktar TB2
- Nigeria – Asisguard Songar, Bayraktar TB2, CAIG Wing Loong, CASC Rainbow, Yabhon Flash-20
- Pakistan – NESCOM Burraq, GIDS Shahpar-2, CAIG Wing Loong II, CH-4 Rainbow, Bayraktar TB2, Bayraktar Akıncı
- Poland – Bayraktar TB2
- Qatar – Bayraktar TB2
- Romania – Bayraktar TB2
- Russia – Kronshtadt Orion, Forpost-R, Shahed 129, Mohajer-6
- Rwanda – Bayraktar TB2
- Saudi Arabia – CAIG Wing Loong, Vestel Karayel
- Serbia – Elbit Hermes 900 (armed variant), CH-95, CH-92A, Pegaz
- South Africa – Milkor 380
- Spain – MQ-9 Reaper
- Sudan – Mohajer-6, Ababil-3
- Syria – Mohajer-6, Mohajer-4, Ababil-3, Ababil-2
- Taiwan- NCSIST Teng Yun, MQ-9 Reaper (on order)
- Tajikistan- Ababil-2, Mohajer-2
- Togo – Bayraktar TB2
- Tunisia – TAI Anka
- Turkey – TAI Anka, Bayraktar TB2, Vestel Karayel, TAI Aksungur, Bayraktar Akıncı
- Turkmenistan – Bayraktar TB2, CASC Rainbow, CASIC WJ, Busel MB1, Busel MB2, Skystriker
- Ukraine – Bayraktar TB2, R18
- United Arab Emirates – Bayraktar TB2, CAIG Wing Loong II
- United Kingdom – MQ-9 Reaper/Protector RG1
- United States – MQ-1 Predator, MQ-1C Gray Eagle, MQ-9 Reaper, Boeing MQ-25 Stingray
- Venezuela- Mohajer-6, Mohajer-2

== See also ==
- Unmanned surveillance and reconnaissance aerial vehicle
- Loyal wingman using AI
- Drone carrier
- Civilian casualties from US drone strikes
- History of unmanned aerial vehicles
- History of unmanned combat aerial vehicles
- List of unmanned aerial vehicles
- UAVs in the U.S. military
