= History of unmanned combat aerial vehicles =

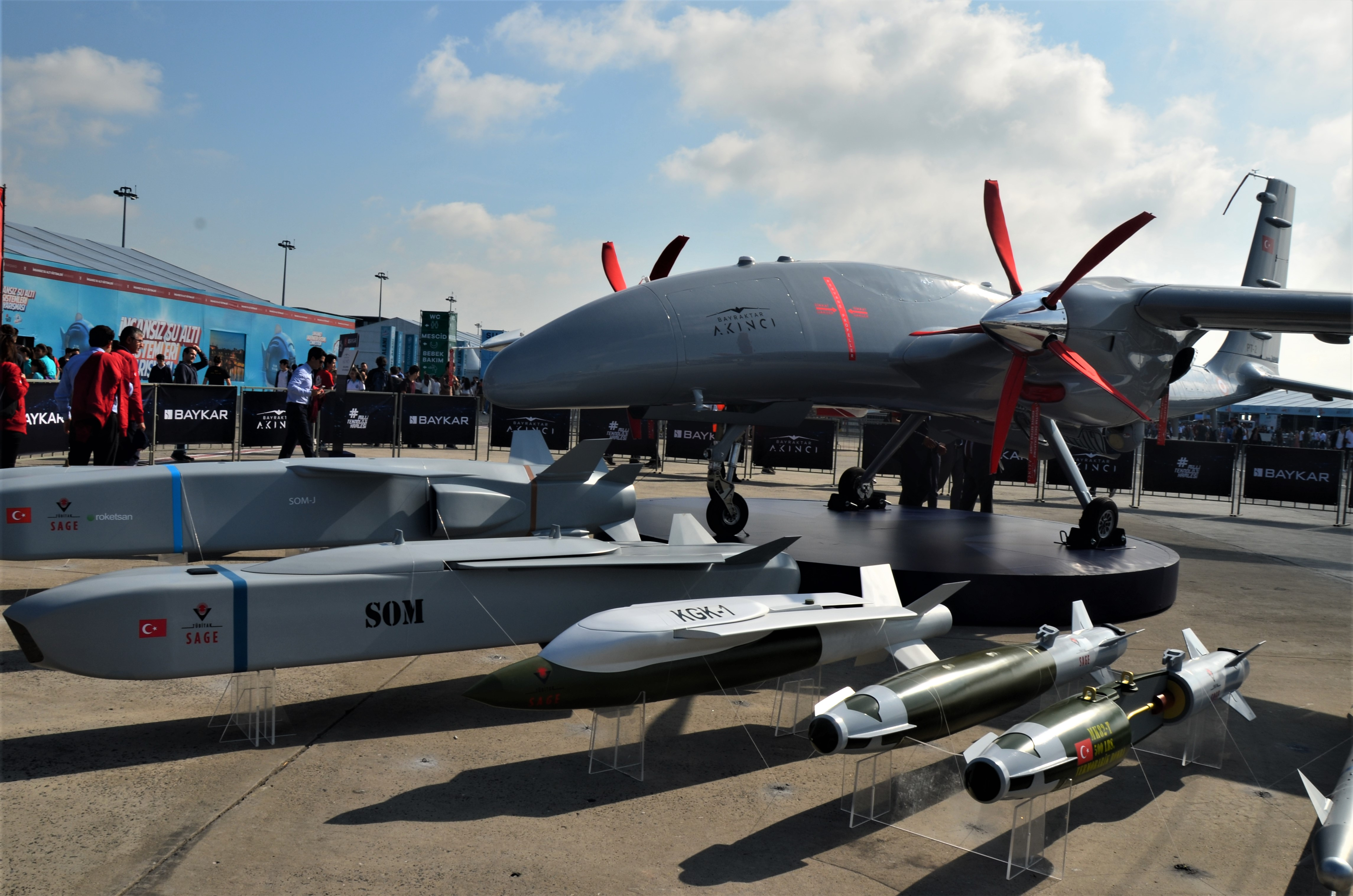
Turkish Bayraktar Akıncı UCAV with its weaponry including SOM air-launched cruise missiles

The history of unmanned combat aerial vehicles (UCAVs) is closely tied to the general history of unmanned aerial vehicles (UAVs). While the technology dates back at least as far as the 1940s, common usage in live operations came in the 2000s. UCAVs have now become an important part of modern warfare, including in the Syrian civil war, the 2020 Nagorno-Karabakh war and during the 2022 Russian invasion of Ukraine.

== Early years ==
In July 1849, during the siege of Venice, the Austrian forces used unmanned balloons to drop bombs on the city.

The Hewitt-Sperry Automatic Airplane, which first flew in 1917, was a US-developed flying bomb. The project continued through to 1925. The RAE Larynx was a similar project in the UK that ran from 1925 to 1929.

One of the earliest explorations of the concept of the combat drone was by Lee de Forest, an early inventor of radio devices, and U. A. Sanabria, a TV engineer. They presented their idea in an article in a 1940 publication of Popular Mechanics.

Operation Aphrodite in 1944 saw the USAAF and US Navy using radio-controlled, unmanned bombers as precision-guided munitions.

The Interstate TDR was a purpose-built unmanned aerial combat vehicle that saw some use in WWII.

The V-1 flying bomb was an early cruise missile used extensively by Nazi Germany 1944-5.

== Cold War era 1945–1992 ==
During the 1960s the US Navy installed thousands of QH-50 DASH torpedo-launching helicopter drones on many of their destroyers. They were meant as a stopgap measure to counter the threat of an ever-growing fleet of Soviet attack submarines. The entire fleet was retired when larger destroyers were introduced, permitting the use of manned helicopters to launch the same kind of torpedo, and the use of more powerful rocket-assisted torpedo systems.

In 1971, John Stuart Foster Jr., a nuclear physicist and former head of the Lawrence Livermore National Laboratory (then called the Lawrence Radiation Laboratory), was a model aeroplane hobbyist and had the idea this hobby could be applied to building weapons. He drew up plans and by 1973 DARPA (Defense Advanced Research Projects Agency) built two prototypes called "Prairie" and "Calera". They were powered by a modified lawn-mower engine and could stay aloft for two hours while carrying a 28-pound (13 kg) load.

If UAVs could be used for reconnaissance by the army and the air force, it was obvious that they could also be used for active combat missions, at least in principle. In practice, shooting at a specific ground target is much trickier than flying over an area and taking pictures, and it wasn't until the 1970s that the US Air Force seriously experimented with the concept. The objective was to study an attack system to perform the dangerous "suppression of enemy air defenses (SEAD)" mission, or in other words to destroy enemy anti-aircraft gun and SAM sites. The project was known as HAVE LEMON. HAVE LEMON involved a number of Ryan Firebees equipped with a weapons pylon under each wing, a forward-looking TV camera, and a datalink mounted in a pod on top of the vertical tailplane. These UAVs were given the designation "BGM-34A" and used beginning in late 1971 to perform remote-control strikes on simulated air-defense sites with Maverick missiles and HOBOS TV-guided glide bombs.

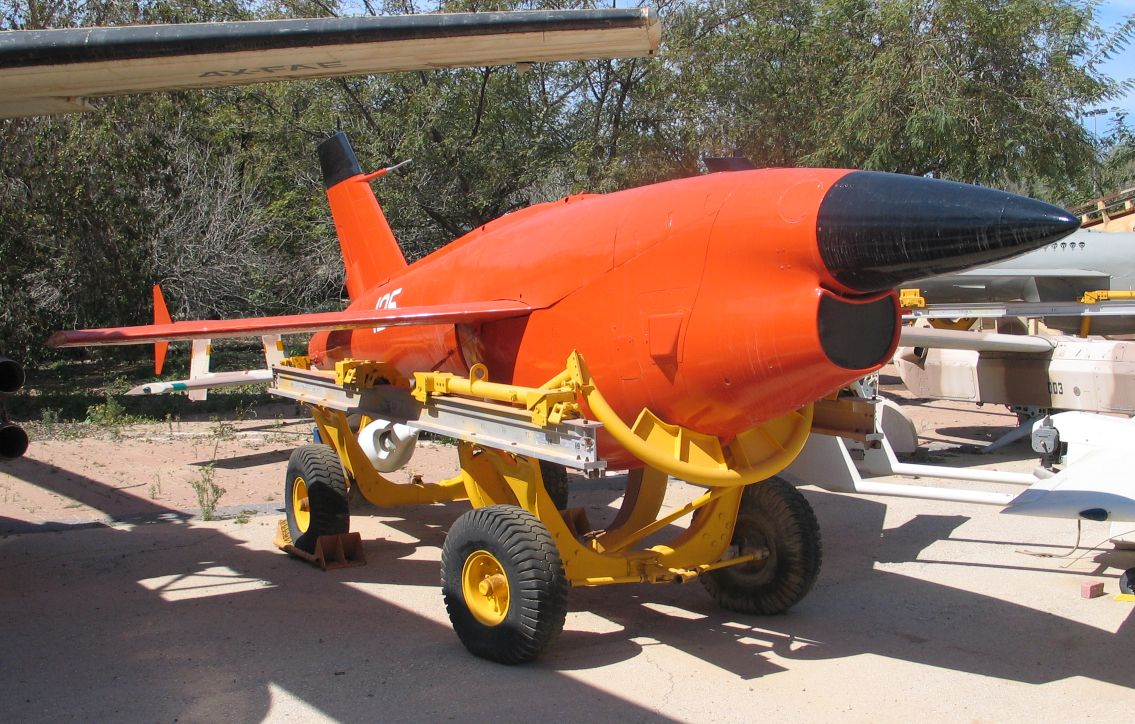
Ryan Firebee

The results were good enough to permit follow-on development, resulting in the BGM-34B, which featured an extended nose to accommodate an infrared imaging system (some sources say low-light-level TV) and laser designator for targeting and control of laser-guided bombs. Tests performed in 1973 and 1974 with the BGM-34B were also successful, and led Teledyne Ryan to develop a BGM-34C as a conversion of existing Lightning Bug airframes. The BGM-34C could be used for reconnaissance or strike missions by swapping out nose modules and other elements.

The concept proved to be a little too far ahead of its time. Nobody in the Air Force hierarchy stepped forward to take ownership of the issue, and the HAVE LEMON exercise faded away. The test squadron was disbanded in 1979 and its roughly 60 UAVs were put into storage. However, in the summer of 2003 a UAV "airshow" of sorts was conducted, in which a Firebee was displayed carrying two Hellfire anti-armor missiles, as well as a pod for dispensing remote battlefield sensors.

As attention focused on the combat capabilities of attack drones, the USN and USAF were looking for drones that could turn 6Gs and quickly roll into tight turns. While at the same time, US designers were wondering if dog-fights between robot planes were just around the corner. From 25 January-28 April 1971, a batch of Maneuverability Augmentation System for Tactical Air Combat Simulation (MASTACS) systems were modified onto existing US Navy BQM-34A drones. These UAVs were test flown to evaluate their maneuvering characteristics, which were deemed good. On 10 May 1971, the MASTACS exercise was ready to commence off the coast of California, against two USN F-4 Phantom IIs flown by Vietnam combat experienced pilots. The F-4s were equipped with both the infrared homing Sidewinder and radar-guided Sparrow air-to-air missiles. As the two F-4s approached Santa Catalina Island, a MASTAC-equipped Firebee was ground-launched. The F-4s were vectored towards the interception and the air-to-air battle was on. No restrictions were placed on the F-4 pilots, the air battle was to be a "no holds barred contest", with the very real possibility of a Phantom being rammed by a UAV as it maneuvered during the dogfight. The first action was a head-on maneuver, as the Phantom lined up for the kill, the UAV (drone) pulled a high-G turn and flew over the F-4's canopy. The Firebee was banking into 100-degree maneuvers, and making 180-degree reversal turns within 12 seconds. The Phantoms were no longer attacking the UAV, they were now the targets. The UAVs had been able to pull and hold 6 Gs within three seconds of receiving the command, and still maintain altitude. The Phantoms were unable to maintain track on the UAV, but fired their air-to-air missiles anyway, receiving no hits.

In the 1973 Yom Kippur War, Israel used unarmed U.S. Ryan Firebee target drones to spur Egypt into firing its entire arsenal of anti-aircraft missiles. This mission was accomplished with no injuries to Israeli pilots, who soon exploited the depleted Egyptian defences. In the late 1970s and 80s, Israel developed the Scout and the Pioneer, which represented a shift toward the lighter, glider-type model of UAV in use today. Israel pioneered the use of unmanned aerial vehicles (UAVs) for real-time surveillance, electronic warfare, and decoys. The images and radar decoying provided by these UAVs helped Israel to completely neutralize the Syrian air defences in Operation Mole Cricket 19 at the start of the 1982 Lebanon War, resulting in no pilots downed.

In the late 1980s, Iran deployed a drone armed with six RPG-7 rounds in the Iran–Iraq War.

== 1990s ==
Over the next two decades, more reliable communications links were developed, automated systems came into much wider use, and the military learned to be much more comfortable with such new technologies. In the late 1990s, the concept of using UAVs for performing actual combat, was revived in the form of various designs generally designated as "uninhabited combat air vehicles".

One of the initial concepts was to develop a UCAV on a fast track for "air occupation". The idea was to use unpiloted aircraft to fly continuous patrols over hostile territory, with some of the aircraft fitted with sophisticated sensors to identify enemy activities and target them, and other aircraft following up with attacks. The idea was obviously inspired by USAF air patrols over Iraq and the Balkans.

The United States Navy also began studies for UCAVs at about the same time. The Navy saw that UCAVs had a number of potential benefits. They promised to be cheaper than manned aircraft, with a lower purchase cost and much lower operating costs, since operators could be given much of their training through simulations. UCAVs would also be smaller and stealthier than manned aircraft, and could perform high-G maneuvers impossible with piloted aircraft, allowing them to dodge missiles and enemy fighters. Indeed, since the Navy found themselves increasingly committed to the use of expensive cruise missiles to perform punitive strikes and other limited military operations, UCAVs offered a potentially cheaper alternative, a "reusable cruise missile". One UCAV could carry a number of smart GPS-guided munitions and hit multiple targets on a single sortie, and then return home to be used again. Even with a high combat attrition rate, the cost would be less than that of a barrage of cruise missiles.

UCAVs missions would be conducted by an operator in a ground vehicle, warship, or control aircraft over a high speed digital data link. The operator would not really be flying the UCAV directly, however, since the robot would be able to handle the details of flight operations by itself, leaving the operator in a supervisory role. The UCAV would be able to complete its mission autonomously if communications were cut.

Impressed by Israel's success, the US quickly acquired a number of UAVs, and its Hunter and Pioneer systems are direct derivatives of Israeli models. The first 'UAV war' was the first Gulf War: according to a May 1991 Department of the Navy report: "At least one UAV was airborne at all times during Desert Storm." After the Gulf War successfully demonstrated its utility, global militaries invested widely in the domestic development of combat UAVs.

== 2000s ==
The US increasingly used Predator drones following the invasion of Afghanistan, but the technology also became more widely available. The US increased its use of drone strikes against targets in foreign countries and elsewhere as part of the war on terror. In January 2014, it was estimated that 2,400 people had died from U.S. drone strikes in five years. In June 2015, the total death toll of U.S. drone strikes was estimated to exceed 6,000. The first "kill" by an American UAV was on October 7, 2001, in Kandahar.

Both the US Air Force and Navy had been developing plans for operational follow-ons to their respective demonstrator programs, but pressures rose for the two services to merge their efforts, resulting in the formation of the Joint Unmanned Combat Air Systems (J-UCAS) program in October 2003 under DARPA direction. The goal of the J-UCAS effort was to select a single contractor to provide from 10 to 12 machines for operational evaluation in the 2007-8 time frame. In the 2006 Quadrennial Defense Review, it was stated that the J-UCAS program would be terminated and instead a new long-range strategic bomber program was launched.

== 2010s ==
Turkey used drones against the Kurdistan Workers' Party in Turkey and in Syria during the Syrian civil war. Turkish drones were also used in the Libyan civil war in 2019.

== 2020s ==
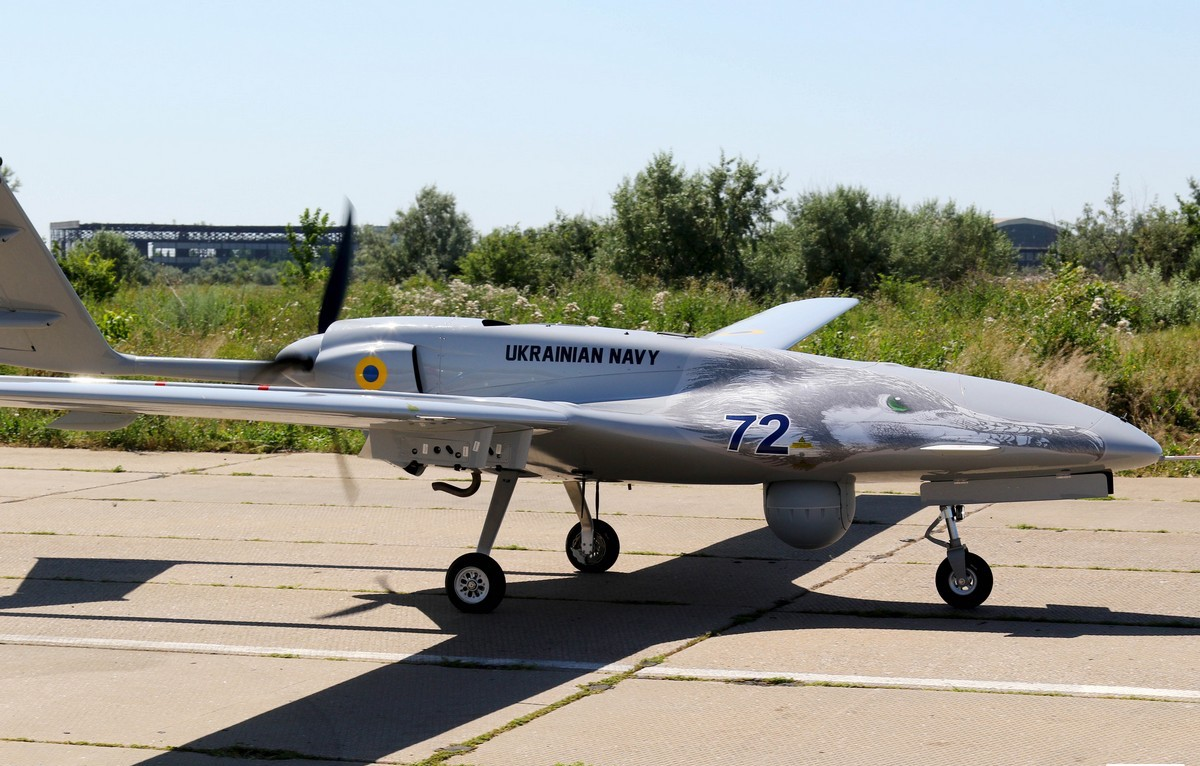
A Ukrainian Navy Bayraktar TB2 UCAV in July 2021

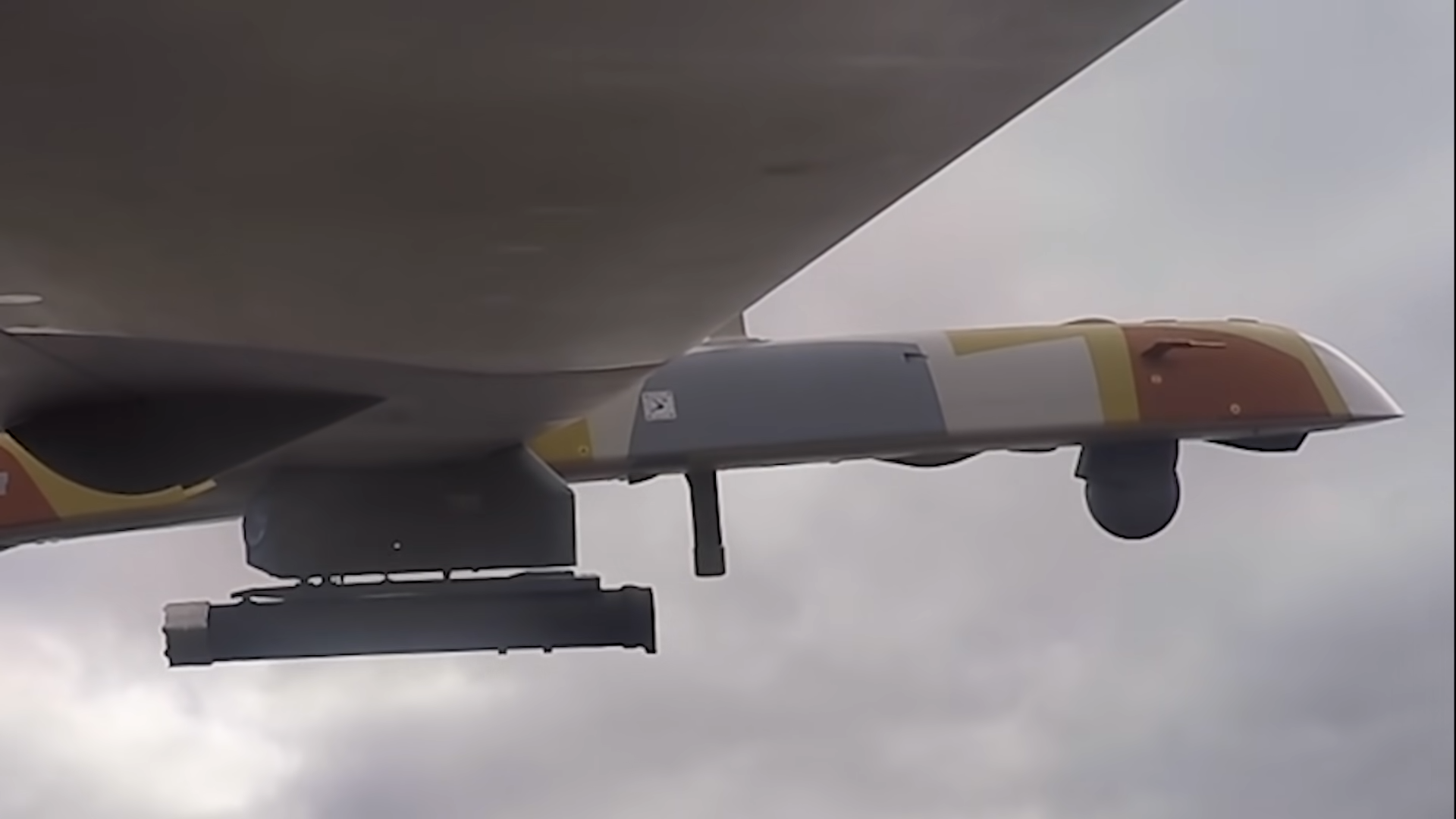
A Russian Orion in use during the invasion of Ukraine

In 2020, Turkey became the first country to use UCAVs in a large, coordinated attack on a conventional battlefield when they attacked forces in Syria. They were used to attack enemy positions, to provide cover for ground forces and to scout for artillery.

Drones were used extensively in the 2020 Nagorno-Karabakh war between Azerbaijan and Armenia. Azerbaijan's use of Turkish TB2 drones was seen as crucial in their defeat of the Armenian forces. They were used both to carry missiles and for reconnaissance, with their successful use linked to heavy losses among Armenian tanks and other armoured vehicles. Armenian ground air defences were largely ineffective against UCAVs. This success was seen as offering countries air power without the expense of a traditional air force.

Drones were also used extensively during the 2022 Russian invasion of Ukraine. Ukraine made extensive use of TB2s and other designs against Russia in 2022. They also used octocopters to drop anti-tank grenades at night. one example of a large-scale attack with drones was in October 2022, when Russia described a "massive" attack by UAVs and sea drones on their Black Sea Fleet at Sevastopol, during which the flagship Admiral Makarov was damaged. Russia has also used drones against Ukrainian forces, including the Iranian-made Shahed-136 since September 2022. Belarusian partisans in BYPOL also claimed to have used drones in a successful attack on a Russian military aircraft at the Machulishchy airfield in February 2023.

The large number of drones deployed has also seen high rates of losses, with Ukraine estimated in 2023 to be losing 10,000 drones per month in active service. Some commercial drones such as DJI Mavic and Phantom have been modified to carry light explosives for combat missions in recent wars.

Some reconnaissance drones that have armed capability include the CASC CH-92, IAI Eitan and the Ababil-3, Ababil-5, Hamaseh. Some commercial drones such as DJI Mavic and Phantom have been modified to carry light explosives for combat missions in recent wars. Ukraine has used converted light sports planes.

Fighting between India and Pakistan in May 2025 also saw the extensive use of drones.

On November 30, 2025, the Turkish Bayraktar Kızılelma launched a Gökdoğan, a Beyond-Visual-Range (BVR) air-to-air missile, which is equipped with an active radar seeker head, using the autonomous guidance capabilities of its own integrated MURAD AESA Radar system, making it the world's first unmanned fighter jet to validate a BVR engagement capability on a fully autonomous platform.
