= Qods Mohajer 10 =

2023 Iranian long range strike drone

Mohajer 10
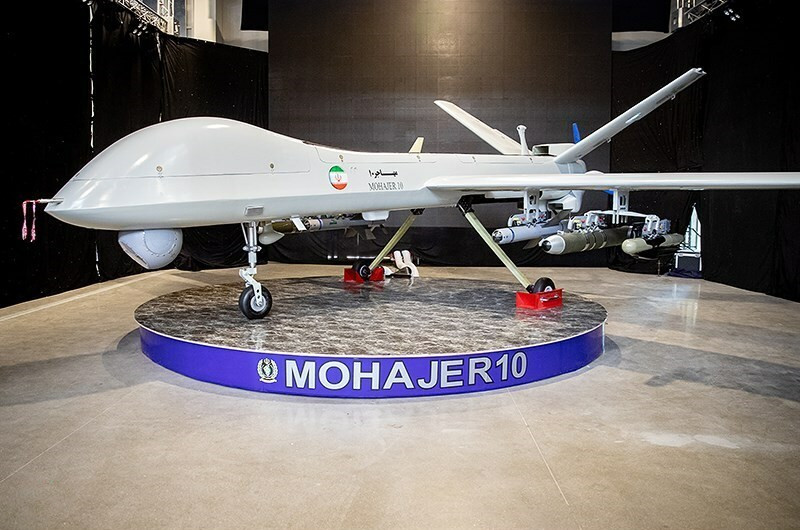
- Type: Airstrike, Intelligence, Reconnaissance, Surveillance, Electronic comms, Full-spectrum superiority
- Place of origin: Iran

Production history
- Designer: Qods Aviation Industry Company
- Manufacturer: IAIO, Qods Aviation Industry Company, Islamic Revolutionary Guard Corps, Ministry of Defense and Armed Forces Logistics
- Produced: 2023
- No. built: At least 5 in February 2025

The Qods Mohajer 10 (Persian: مهاجر ۱۰, lit. 'Jerusalem immigrant') is an Iranian UCAV unveiled in 2023. It has an operational range of 2000 km (or 1,240 miles), its airframe has a visual resemblance to the MQ-9 Reaper. It has a 24 hour flight endurance ability and can carry up to 300 kg of cargo, including munitions and electronic equipments. It was officially unveiled in August 2023, in the presence of the Iranian President Ebrahim Raisi and the Minister of Defense Brigadier-General Mohammad-Reza Gharaei Ashtiani.

In the unveiling ceremony, Mohajer 10 was equipped with 6 air-to-ground munitions; the Almas missile, Ghaem bomb and Dastvareh/Arman-1 gliding bomb. An Israeli television channel claimed that in the first showcase of the drone, the Israeli city of Dimona was threatened with a "prepare your bunker" message written in Hebrew. However the Iranian Broadcasting report and the official unveiling teaser from the Iranian MODAFL did not contain any reference to Israel..

Mohajer 9 and 7 are under development and no information has been published on them. Mohajer 8 is supposedly an upgraded version of Mohajer 6, the later one having operated in different countries such as Iraq, Syria and Russia. The drone is said to be developed based on requests from the IRGC Navy, IRGC Ground Force and the Iranian Army Ground Force.

== Description ==
Its fuel capacity is 450 liters. Its maximum speed is 210 km/h. It can fly up to a 7 km altitude.

According to IRNA, the Mohajer 10 is fitted with surveillance and electronic warfare capabilities, it is capable of flying at speeds of up to 130 mph, and can carry several kinds of armament with a maximum payload of over 650 pounds.

== See also ==
- CAIG Wing Loong II
- Kaman 22 (UAV)
- Shahed 149 Gaza
