= Kian (UAV) =

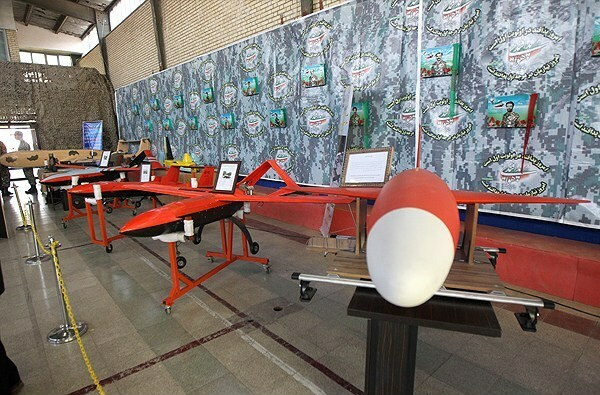
- Type: One-way attack drone
- Place of origin: Iran

Service history
- Used by: Islamic Republic of Iran Army

Specifications
- Length: 4.5 metres (15 ft)

The Kian is an Iranian military unmanned aerial vehicle. The aircraft is said to be capable of continuous travel for more than 1,000 km and able to climb to 5,000 meters above sea level. The aircraft was designed, manufactured and tested by experts from the Iranian Air Force drone unit.

This drone was introduced in September 2019. It is a combat and defense drone available in two variants, featuring high-speed capabilities for interception, reconnaissance, and extended flight endurance missions to execute precise operations. This drone features a wingspan ranging from approximately 3.5 to 4 meters and a length of around 4.5 meters, surpassing the dimensions of the "Kian-1." Its robust wings, designed for optimal performance at subsonic speeds, enable the "Kian-2" to transport a significantly greater amount of fuel.

This drone is equipped with a compact gas turbine jet engine, likely of the turbojet variety, housed within the fuselage. It features two air inlets of sophisticated design, aligned with the fuselage and its lateral surfaces. Additionally, the drone is designed with a delta wing configuration, which enhances its flight performance, offering superior maneuverability that improves target destruction accuracy at elevated speeds. Similar to the Kian-1, the Kian-2 drone employs a solid fuel bed to initiate flight and achieve the requisite initial speed for the jet engine to become operational.

== See also ==
- List of military equipment manufactured in Iran
- Islamic Republic of Iran Armed Forces
- Defense industry of Iran
- Unmanned aerial vehicles in the Iranian military
- Loitering munition
- Shahed 149 Gaza
- Arash (drone)
