= Atobá XR =

Brazilian unmanned aerial vehicle

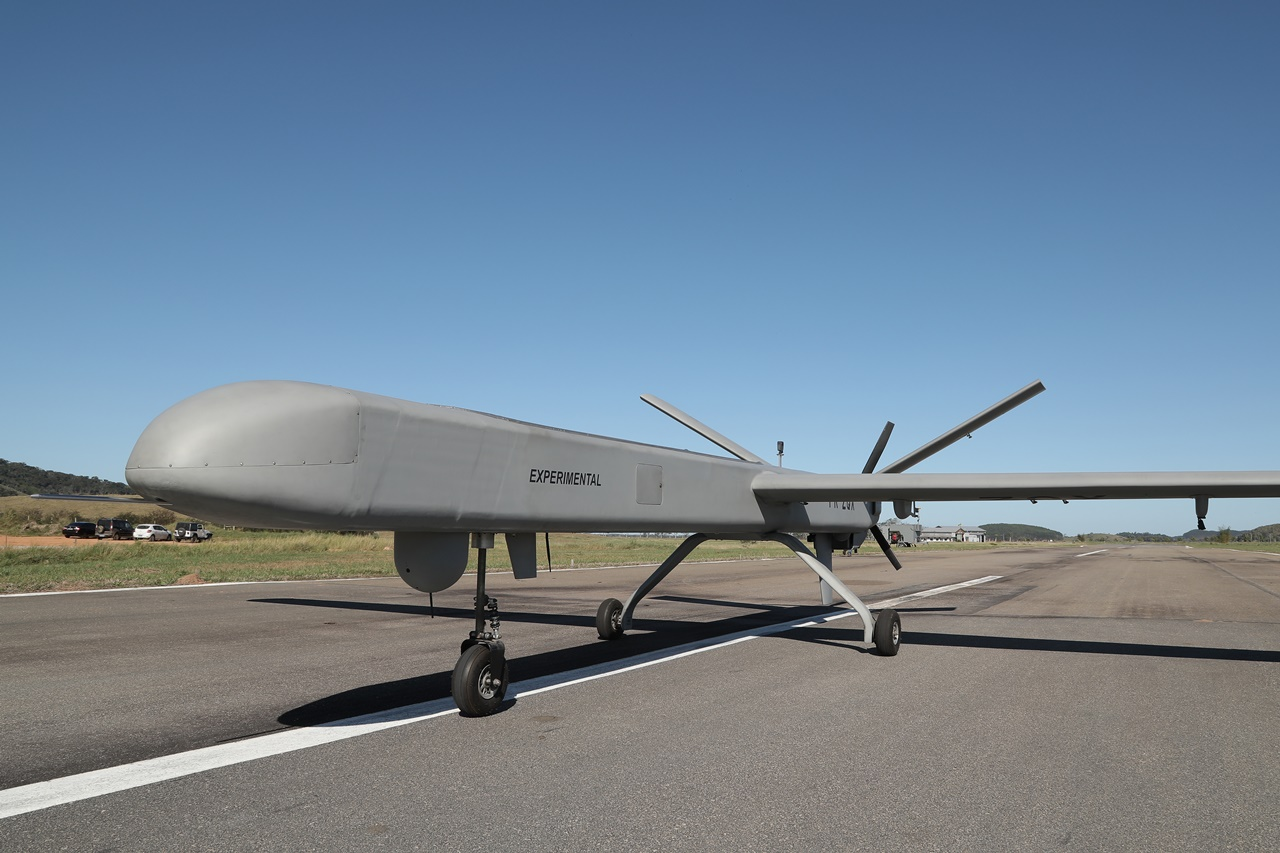

General information
- Type: Unmanned combat aerial vehicle
- National origin: Brazil
- Manufacturer: Stella Tecnologia
- Status: Under development
- Primary user: Brazilian Armed Forces

History
- Introduction date: 2025
- Developed from: Stella Tecnologia Atobá

The Atobá XR is a remotely controlled unmanned combat aerial vehicle capable of autonomous flight and attack operations under development by the company Stella Tecnologia primarily for the Brazilian Armed Forces. The Atobá XR is the first Brazilian hunter-killer UAV designed for long-endurance and high-altitude surveillance operations.

The Atobá XR is a development from the reconnaissance drone Atobá already in operation, with specifications defined by the Brazilian Air Force, as revealed by the CEO of Stella, Gilberto Buffara, in April 2024 during the LAAD Security & Defence. The Atobá XR will be able to carry battlefield intelligence, reconnaissance, patrol and attack missions in up to 35 hours of duration.

== Specifications ==
Data from Stella Tecnologia

General characteristics

- Length: 31 ft 2 in (9.5 m)
- Wingspan: 55 ft 9 in (17 m)
- Empty weight: 3,086 lb (1,400 kg)
- Max takeoff weight: 3,748 lb (1,700 kg)
- Powerplant: 1 × Rotax 916 Four stroke turbocharged, 160 hp (120 kW)

Performance

- Cruise speed: 230 mph (370 km/h, 200 kn)
- Endurance: up to 35 hr

Armament

- 3 hardpoints
- Unknown number of ground missiles, loitering munitions or laser-guided bombs

Avionics

- Hensoldt Argos 2 Multi-Spectral Targeting System
- Hensoldt PrecISR 1000 AESA radar
- GPS communication system
- Electro-optical pod with day light, infrared and thermal cameras and sensors
- SATCOM

== See also ==
Aircraft of comparable role, configuration, and era

- General Atomics MQ-9 Reaper
- Elbit Hermes 900
- BAE Systems Mantis
- Baykar Bayraktar Akıncı
- IAI Eitan
- CAIG Wing Loong II
- Shahed 149 Gaza

Related lists

- List of unmanned aerial vehicles
