= Kaman 22 (UAV) =

Wide-body unmanned aerial vehicle

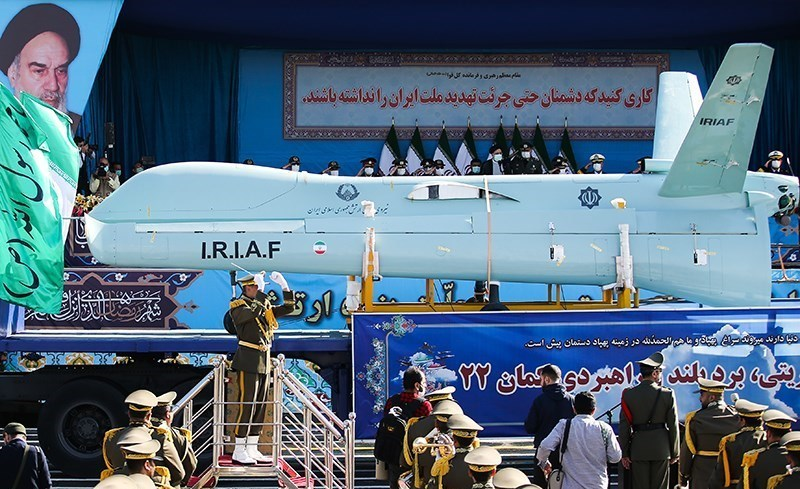
- Kaman 22

General information
- Type: Unmanned combat aerial vehicle
- National origin: Iran
- Manufacturer: Islamic Republic of Iran Air Force
- Designer: IRIAF Islamic Republic of Iran Air Force (Designer)
- Status: Active
- Primary user: Iran

History
- Manufactured: On 24 February 2021 (unveiled)
- Introduction date: First named 27 March 2017. Prototype first show on 24 February 2021
- First flight: February 24, 2021 (unveiling date)

Kaman 22 (UAV) (Persian: پهپاد کمان ۲۲) is an Iranian wide-body unmanned combat aerial vehicle (UCAV) unveiled on 24 February 2021 by the Islamic republic of Iran Air Force. It is said to be the country's first wide-body drone. The range of the Kaman 22 is approximately 3,000 km (1,900 mi) and it can carry 300 kg (660 lb) of explosives.

According to IRIAF commander Aziz Nasirzadeh, the Kaman 22 is the first domestically-manufactured wide-body combat drone in the country capable of carrying all kinds of munition.

== History ==
On April 1, 2025, the Kaman 22 was reportedly offered to the Brazilian military as part of efforts to acquire UAVs free of International Traffic in Arms Regulation (ITAR) controls.

== See also ==
- Aerospace Force of the Islamic Revolutionary Guard Corps
- Armed Forces of the Islamic Republic of Iran
- Defense industry of Iran
- Meraj (UAV)

Related development

- Kaman-12 (UAV)

Aircraft of comparable role, configuration, and era

- Shahed 129
- Shahed 149 Gaza

Related lists

- List of military equipment manufactured in Iran
- List of unmanned aerial vehicles
