= Kaman-19 (UAV) =

Iranian unmanned aerial vehicle

General information
- Type: UAV
- National origin: Iran
- Status: In service
- Primary user: Iran

History
- Manufactured: 3 October 2023 (Was Unveiled)
- Introduction date: 3 October 2023
- First flight: 3 October 2023

The HESA Kaman-19 (Persian: پهپاد کمان-۱۹) is an Iranian electronic warfare (EW) unmanned aerial vehicle (UAV) developed by Iran Aircraft Manufacturing Industries Corporation (HESA) and operated by the Islamic Republic of Iran Air Force (IRIAF). Designed primarily for disruption, electronic countermeasure (ECM) operationsp and aerial surveillance, it represents a specialized variant within Iran's broader "Kaman" family of military drones.

== Development and Unveiling ==
The Kaman-19 was publicly revealed on 3 October 2023, during the joint military exercises titled Eqtedar (Might) 1402 conducted by the Iranian Armed Forces. The drone executed its maiden flight during these operational tests, demonstrating electronic jamming and combat support roles alongside existing Iranian air assets.

Unlike its predecessor, the larger long-range strike UAV Kaman-22, the Kaman-19 was engineered specifically as a dedicated airborne electronic warfare unit. Its development aligns with Iran's strategic shift toward integrating non-kinetic electronic warfare capability directly into unmanned aerial systems to neutralize adversary defense radars and communications networks.

== Design and Capabilities ==
The Kaman-19 features a lightweight composite airframe optimized for medium-endurance operations. While full technical specifications remain classified, reported and observed characteristics include:

- Role: Dedicated electronic warfare (EW), signals intelligence (SIGINT) and radar jamming.
- Payload: Outfitted with specialized electronic countermeasure pods capable of disrupting ground-based early warning radars, surface-to-air missile (SAM) guidance systems and hostile tactical communications.
- Operation: Works in direct coordination with crewed strike aircraft (such as Su-24s and F-4 Phantoms) or other reconnaissance drones to create radar-blind corridors during tactical engagements.

== Operational History ==
- October 2023: The aircraft completed its initial test flight and operational debut during joint electronic warfare maneuvers. Iran's Tasnim News Agency reported that the Kaman-19 successfully jammed simulated hostile radars and interrupted real-time command-and-control links during the drills.

== See also ==
- Unmanned aerial vehicles in the Iranian military § List of Iranian military UAVs
