= Red Baron Squadron (Israel) =

- טייסת הברון האדום
- Logo of the Squadron
- Active: January 28, 2019 – present
- Country: Israel
- Allegiance: Israel Defense Forces
- Branch: Israeli Air Force
- Type: Training Squadron
- Role: Training German and Israeli operatives
- Garrison/HQ: Tel Nof Airbase

Aircraft flown
- Trainer: IAI Eitan

The Red Baron Squadron is a squadron in the Israeli Air Force, which operates Eitan type UAVs from the Tel Nof Airbase. The squadron was established on January 28, 2019 as part of an agreement between the Government of Israel, the Israeli Aerospace Industries and the German Army. It is the only Israeli Air Force squadron without a numerical designation.

== Roles ==
The squadron's role is to train Israeli and German pilots as operators of the Eitan UAV, until the end of the development of the UAV of the German Air Force (variant of the "Eitan"), and then to train them directly on the German UAV. The value of the agreement between the countries is estimated at 900 million Euros, under which the German Air Force will lease seven UAVs for a period of nine years. Five of the UAVs will be used for operational purposes and two more for training In addition to the lease agreement, a contract in the amount of 170 million euros was decided on for the use of the airport and airspace.

== Namesake ==
The squadron is named after Manfred von Richthofen, a German fighter pilot and fighter pilot during World War I. Manfred, who was identified with a red " Fokker Dr.I " three-wing plane, in addition to being Freiherr, he was nicknamed after the war as "The Red Baron". The name of the squadron was proposed by the Israeli side of the agreement, marking the legacy of the battle of the Red Baron.

== Honours ==
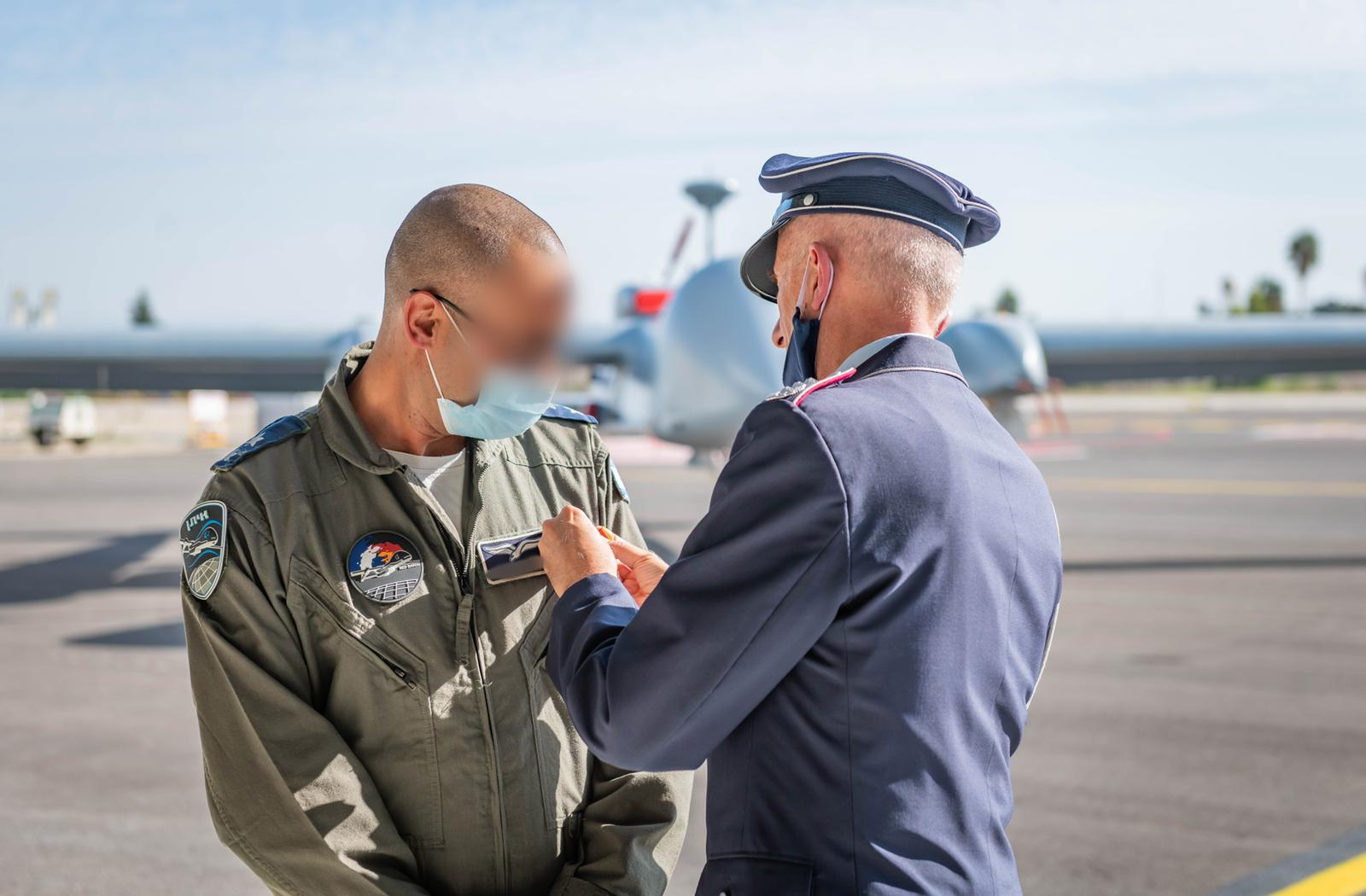
Colonel Jürgen Hefner awarding the Cross of Honor to the Squadron Commander

In November 2020, Germany's military attaché in Israel, Colonel Jürgen Hefner, awarded the Cross of Honor to the first squadron commander, Lt. Col. Y (name kept secret).
