= Arash (drone) =

DIO Arash
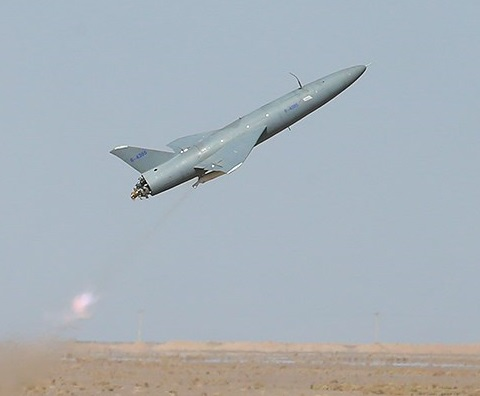
- Type: One-way attack drone
- Place of origin: Iran

Service history
- Used by: Islamic Republic of Iran Army; Hezbollah

Specifications
- Length: 4.5 metres (15 ft)

The DIO Arash, Arash 2 is an Iranian long-range one-way attack drone in Islamic Republic of Iran military service from 2020.

It has a 2,000 km strike range and carries a 150 kg warhead.

== Operator ==
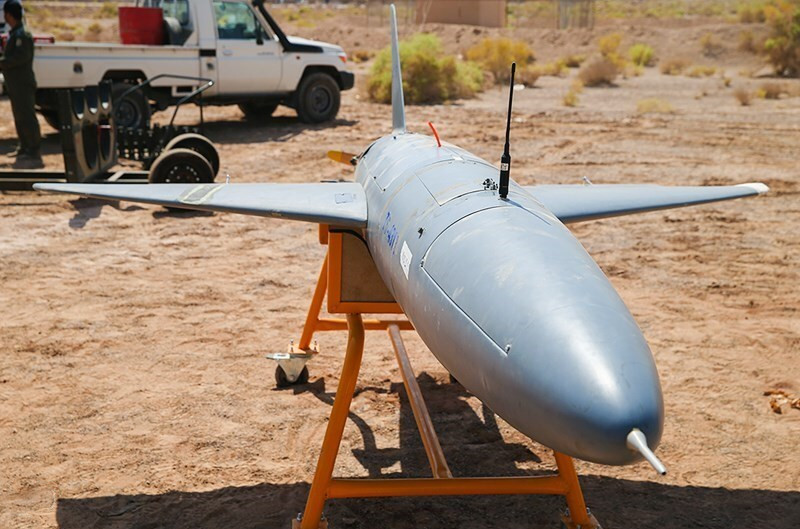
Iranian drone exercise in 2022 - Day 1 (39)

This drone is operated by the Islamic Republic of Iran Army Ground Forces and is an upgraded version of the Kian 2 drone, featuring a piston engine instead of a jet engine.

Arash-2 drones may be, or may have been, supplied to Russia.
