= IAIO Fotros =

Iranian unmanned combat aerial vehicle

HESA Fotros
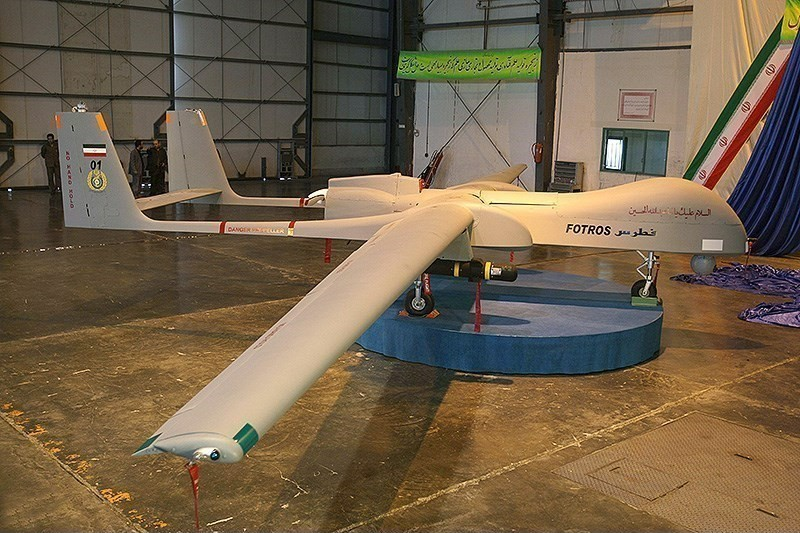
- Fotros UAV at its unveiling ceremony

General information
- Type: Unmanned combat aerial vehicle
- Manufacturer: HESA
- Status: Accepted for service
- Primary user: Iran
- Number built: Unknown, at least 3

History
- Introduction date: 2020
- First flight: November 2013

The HESA Fotros (Persian: فطرس fʊtros) is an Iranian reconnaissance, surveillance, and combat unmanned aerial vehicle built by Iran Aircraft Manufacturing Industries Corporation and unveiled in November 2013. It was the largest Iranian drone at its unveiling. It has an operational range of 1,700 km to 2,000 km with a flight endurance of 16 to 30 hours depending on armament. The name refers to a fallen angel in Shia mythology which was redeemed by Imam Husayn ibn Ali. The Fotros carries up to six missiles or bombs.

== History ==
The Fotros was unveiled in November 2013 in a joint ceremony by MODAFL, IRIAF and IRAA. It is believed that the unveiling of the Fotros was rushed so that it could be unveiled before the start of P5+1 talks over Iran's nuclear programs. It carries at least 6 Ghaem Precision-guided munitions, or 6 of 3 unnamed Precision-guided munitions.

In 2020 the UAV participated in a military training drill known as “Defenders of Velayat Skies.”

== Status ==
There was no news or status update on the Fotros between its announcement in 2013 and 2020.

In 2020 it was announced that the drone had entered service, and more images of it subsequently surfaced. Production is believed to have started, and at least 3 have been produced.

== Specifications ==
General characteristics Performance

- Range: 2,000 km (1,200 mi, 1,100 nmi)
- Endurance: 16 to 30 hours
- Service ceiling: 7,600 m (25,000 ft)

== See also ==
Aircraft of comparable role, configuration, and era

- MQ-1 Predator
- IAI Heron
- TAI Anka
- Shahed 129
- Kaman 22

Related lists

- List of unmanned aerial vehicles
- List of military equipment manufactured in Iran
