= IAI Eitan =

Israeli unmanned reconnaissance aircraft

Eitan
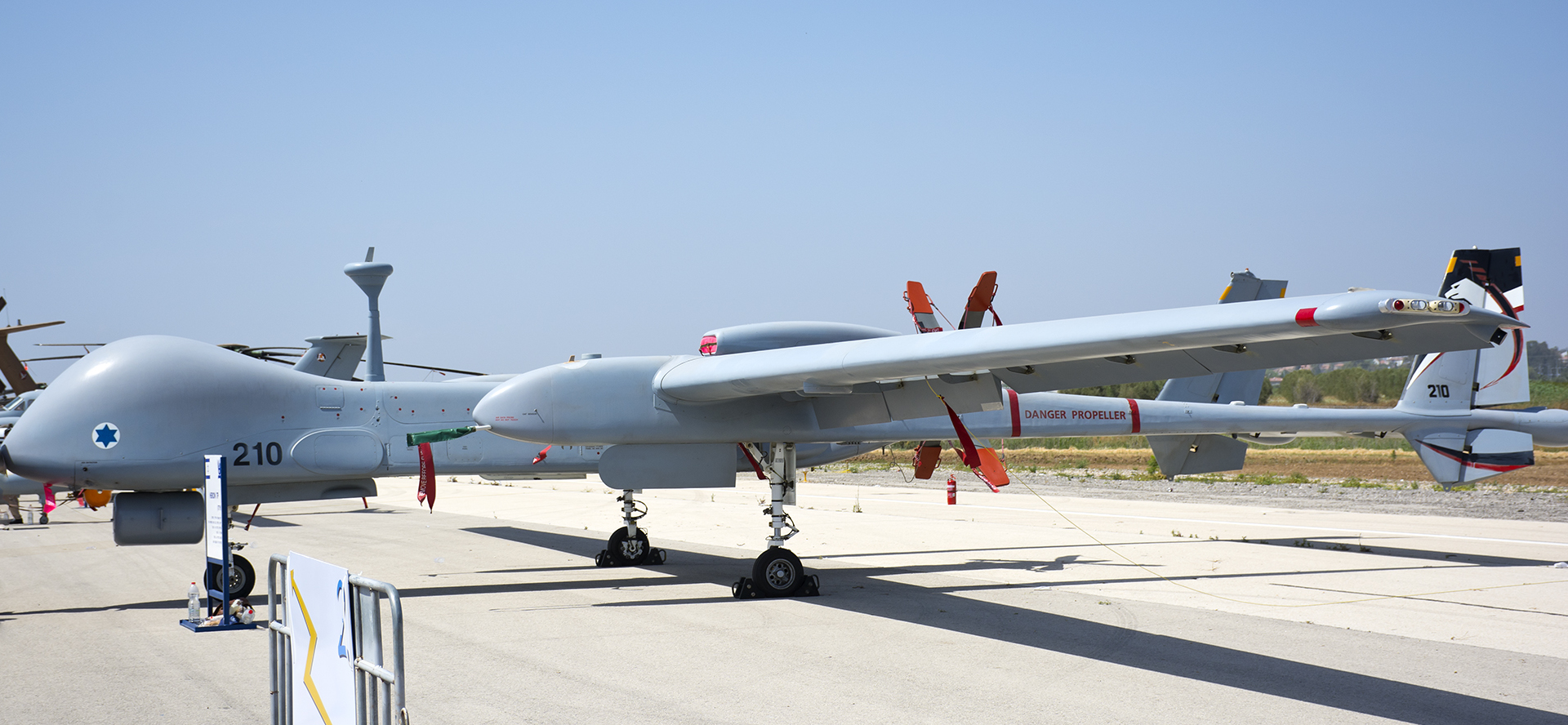

General information
- Type: Unmanned surveillance and reconnaissance aerial vehicle and unmanned combat air vehicle (armed variant)
- National origin: Israel
- Manufacturer: IAI
- Status: Active, In production

History
- First flight: ca. 2004
- Developed from: IAI Heron

The IAI Eitan (איתן – "Steadfast"; export designation Heron TP) is an unmanned reconnaissance aircraft developed in Israel in the early 21st century by the Malat division of Israel Aerospace Industries. The aircraft is a newer version of the IAI Heron. Along with intelligence, surveillance, target acquisition, and reconnaissance (ISTR), Israeli IAI Eitan also capable of holding armed roles. There are conflicting reports on whether the exported Eitan's are unarmed or armed.

== Development ==
In April 2004, the Israeli Air Force magazine announced the existence of the programme and reported that two prototypes were already flying. In March the following year, US company Aurora Flight Sciences announced a joint venture to market the aircraft under the name Orion. Aurora hoped to have a machine flying during 2007, but by the middle of that year, the company had not released anything further about the project. Meanwhile, reports emerged of a "first flight" for the Eitan in Israel on 15 July 2006, despite the previous reports that the aircraft had already been flying two years previously. In late January 2007, Yedioth Ahronoth reported yet another seemingly contradictory announcement, which indicated that the maiden flight was to take place in the coming days.

The Eitan was publicly unveiled at a media event at Tel Nof Airbase on 8 October 2007. The sensors fitted on this occasion included a synthetic aperture radar (SAR) mounted in a pod on the aircraft's belly, a multi-sensor payload carried under its nose, and two conformal signals intelligence (SIGINT) arrays. Additional sensors may be carried at the ends of the tail booms. Analysis of the configuration presented to the media suggests an aircraft intended for deep penetration roles and on-board SIGINT processing capability. However, at the media event an IAF official stated that IAI and the IAF had tested "all kinds of payloads, in all kinds of configuration schemes." Apart from its Intelligence, surveillance, target acquisition, and reconnaissance (ISTAR) role, the Eitan may also be used for aerial refuelling, and armed roles including missile defence and long-range strategic strike.

== Design ==
A medium-altitude, long endurance (MALE) UAV, the Eitan can operate at altitudes above commercial air traffic and features all-weather capability, de-icing systems, automatic takeoff and landing (ATOL) systems, and triple-redundant avionics. It is a high-wing cantilever monoplane with wings of high aspect ratio. Booms extend rearward from the wings and carry twin tails that are joined by a common horizontal stabiliser. The main units of the tricycle undercarriage retract into the tail booms, and the nosewheel retracts into the fuselage. A single turboprop engine is mounted in the rear fuselage, driving a pusher propeller. Construction throughout is of composite materials.

== Operational history ==
One report stated that Israel deployed Eitans in its alleged 2009 airstrike against an alleged Gaza-bound Iranian arms convoy traveling through Sudan.

In February 2010 the Israeli Air Force unveiled its new fleet of Eitans. The first unit to operate the type, 210 Squadron, was inaugurated at Tel Nof in December 2010. In January 2012, an Eitan drone crashed near Hafetz Haim during tests of new payloads; no injuries were reported.

The IDF does not comment on the arming of drones, but reports describe the Eitan being used for "armed roles" with missiles "attached to wing hardpoints," as well as for target acquisition. Used allegedly during several operations, will help government-owned IAI market its latest drone models as "combat-proven systems."

== Exports ==
In 2010 IAI offered the Eitan, under a teaming agreement with Rheinmetall, in pursuit of the German Air Force's long-term "Saateg" MALE UAV requirement. On 21 May 2014, IAI signed a deal with Airbus to team up on a bid for a bridging contract to supply the German armed forces with the Heron TP from 2015 until 2020. A current contract between the companies to supply Germany with the Heron is set to expire by 2015. Airbus said the German government would have the choice of either a purchase option or a lease for the system. Red Baron Squadron of the Israeli Air Force is also providing training to German operatives (in addition to Israeli operatives) to operate these UAVs.

In 2011 France selected the IAI Eitan for the French military. The deal was cancelled later in November 2011 by the French senate with the funds being allocated to a joint Franco-British MALE UAV design.

Britain's Royal Air Force considered purchase of IAI Eitan UAVs in 2012.

India approved a deal of 10 armed Heron TP for $400 million. The drones would supplement the existing fleet of unarmed Herons of the Indian Air Force. However, the proposal was cancelled because of Israeli restrictions on the transfer of advanced technologies that would need to be embedded in the drones. An Israeli source told FlightGlobal in 2017, "The restrictions that the Israeli Ministry of Defense attaches to the export of this advanced UAV (Heron TP) are many, and in such a close competition may be a crucial factor."

It was reported in May 2021 that the Indian Army was negotiating with IAI to lease 4 units of Heron TP UAVs under the emergency procurement. The drones would be leased for three years and 2 units would arrive by August. However, after contract signing, it was corrected that the drones would not be leased but purchased and the variant is Heron Mk2.

In May 2020, Greece signed a deal for the lease of 3 Heron TP for €39 million. As part of the agreement, the IMOD will lease the Heron system in its maritime configuration to Greece over three years, with an option to purchase the system upon completion of the leasing period.

== Operators ==
Israel

- Israeli Defence Force: 10–15 aircraft (est.)

Greece

- Hellenic Air Force: 3

Germany

- German Air Force: 5+3 on order

== Specifications ==
Data from IAI Website

General characteristics

- Capacity: 2,700kg payload
- Max takeoff weight: 5,400kg
- Length: 14m
- Wingspan: 26m
- Powerplant: 1 × Pratt & Whitney Canada PT6-67A , 900 kW (1,200 hp)

Performance

- Maximum speed: 407 km/h (253 mph, 220 kn)
- Range: 7,400 km (4,600 mi, 4,000 nmi)
- Endurance: 30+ hours
- Service ceiling: 14,000 m (46,000 ft)

== See also ==
Aircraft of comparable role, configuration, and era

- Baykar Bayraktar Akıncı
- EADS Talarion
- General Atomics MQ-9 Reaper
- Northrop Grumman RQ-4 Global Hawk
- Stella Tecnologia Atobá XR
- IAIO Fotros
- TAI Aksungur
