= Meraj (UAV) =

Iranian Unmanned Aerial Vehicle

Meraj UAV
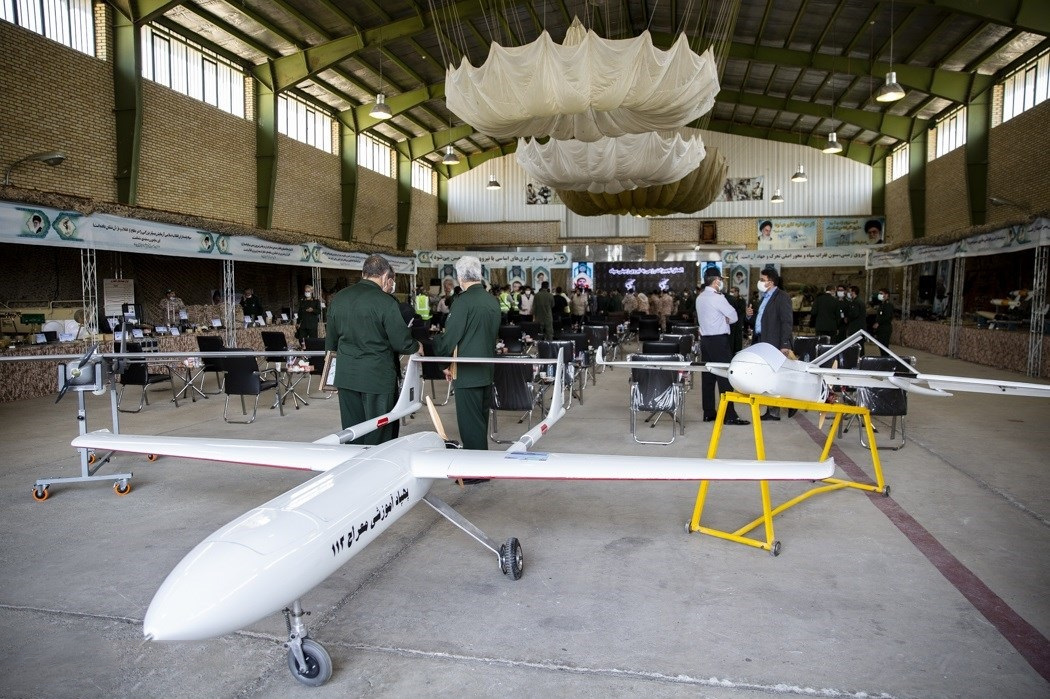
- The Meraj is the drone on the right in this photo.

General information
- Type: UAV
- National origin: Iran
- Manufacturer: Ground Forces of the Islamic Revolutionary Guard Corps
- Designer: HESA
- Status: In service
- Primary user: Iran
- Number built: Not Mentioned

History
- Manufactured: 22 September 2017 (was shown)
- Introduction date: 27 June 2020 (Was Unveiled)
- First flight: 22 September 2017 (Was displayed)

Meraj UAV (Persian: پهپاد معراج) is an Iranian drone belonging to the Islamic Revolutionary Guard Corps. This unmanned aerial vehicle is able to fly at a speed of 140 km/h to an altitude of 12,000 feet (3660 m). Meraj's weight is 33 kilograms and is capable of carrying a load of 5 kilograms. This UAV which is considered among the latest IRGC ground drones, has done its tests/experiments, and is ready to perform reconnaissance missions. Meraj unmanned aerial vehicle is a product of design/construction at the NEZSA Self-Sufficiency Jihad Organization's UAV Research Center.

== History ==
The first time, Meraj-UAV was indicated during a parade on 22 September 2017 in Tehran. The recoil of this Iranian unmanned aerial vehicle is a kind of landing on the belly of the UAV, and that's why this utilizes a built-in elevator camera in its body, which doesn't cause of any damage during its landing. The utilizing of this sort of launcher lets the ascension unmanned aerial vehicle to not need a specific runway for landing/takeoff, and in order to be capable to fly on any type of road(s) or highway(s) that possesses a flat surface.
