= HESA Hamaseh =

Iranian unmanned aerial vehicle

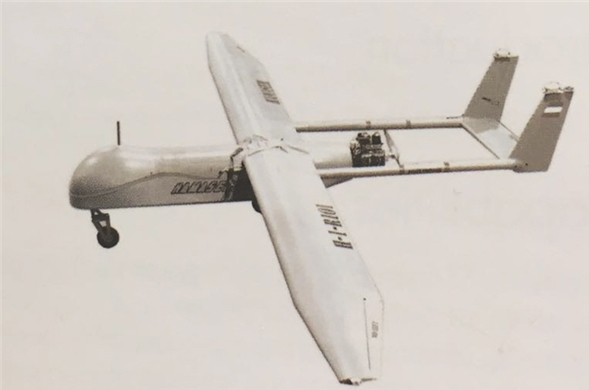

General information
- Type: Unmanned surveillance and reconnaissance aerial vehicle and Unmanned combat aerial vehicle (armed variant)
- National origin: Iran
- Manufacturer: Iran Aircraft Manufacturing Industrial Company (HESA)
- Designer: HESA
- Status: In service
- Primary user: Iranian Armed Forces
- Number built: 30 (2013)

History
- Manufactured: 2013–present?
- First flight: ?

The HESA Hamaseh (Persian: حماسه, romanized: Ḥamāseh, lit. 'Epic') is an Iranian tactical and reconnaissance unmanned aerial vehicle (UAV) with high flight endurance built by Iran Aircraft Manufacturing Industrial Company (HESA). The Hamaseh was unveiled in 2013 and entered service in 2016.

== Design ==
The Hamaseh is a single engine, twin-boom UAV. The UAV features a bulbous forward radome; this was later reduced in size as the UAV was developed. The Hamaseh entered service with Iran in 2016.

The Hamaseh can carry up to 185 kg of fuel, equipment, and payload, and has an endurance of up to 11 hours depending on configuration. It is launched via runway takeoff or JATO, and is recovered by runway landing or, in emergencies, a parachute. The Hamaseh can follow pre-determined waypoints to control its flight. Its powerplant is unknown.

The Hamaseh can carry synthetic aperture radar, radar or communications jammers, and a camera. For weapons, it can carry small bombs, grenades, or rockets.

== Operational history ==
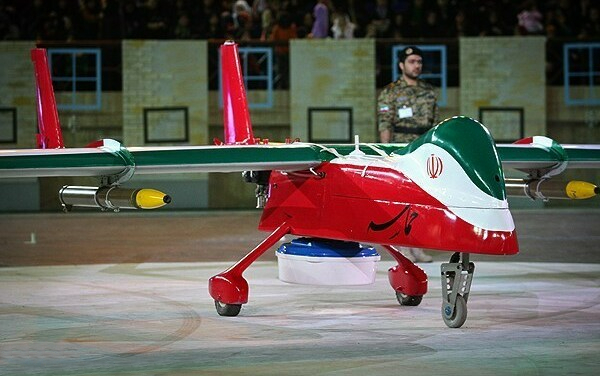
The Hamaseh at its unveiling ceremony in 2013.

The Hamaseh drone was unveiled on 9 May 2013. Ahmad Vahidi, Iran's defense minister, claimed the drone "with its stealth quality can avoid detection by the enemy." The Hamaseh was also claimed to be a High-Altitude Long Endurance (HALE) platform, despite being a tactical UAV. The Hamaseh at its unveiling ceremony was "equipped" with what appeared to be munitions, but they were physically bolted to the wings, not mounted on hardpoints.

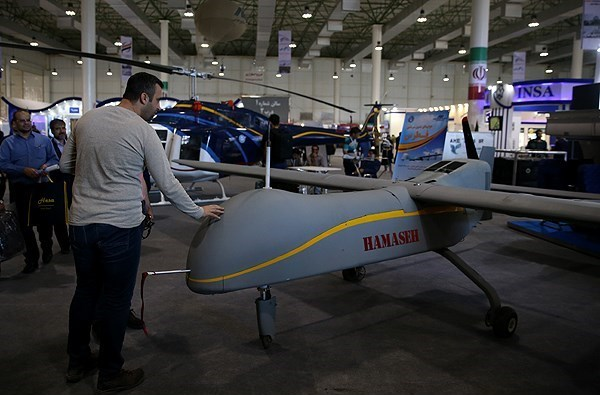
A scale model of a modern Hamaseh UAV in 2016 with the redesigned radome.

The Hamaseh was first used during military exercises by the IRGC Ground Forces in April 2016.

In 2017 HESA offered the Hamaseh for export.

== Operators ==
Iran

- Islamic Revolutionary Guard Corps

== Specifications ==
Data from Иранская экспозиция на МАКС-2017. Часть.2 (Note: This data is from the 2017 MAKS airshow. Specifications for the Hamaseh at the 2018 Eurasia Air Show were slightly different; I don't know why or care.)

General characteristics

- Length: 5.05 m (16 ft 7 in)
- Width: 9 m (29 ft 6 in)
- Height: 1.9 m (6 ft 3 in)
- Empty weight: 230 kg (507 lb)
- Gross weight: 415 kg (915 lb)

Performance

- Maximum speed: 194 km/h (121 mph, 105 kn)
- Cruise speed: 165 km/h (103 mph, 89 kn)
- Stall speed: 110 km/h (68 mph, 59 kn)
- Combat range: 200 km (120 mi, 110 nmi)
- Endurance: up to 11 h (depending on payload)
- Service ceiling: 4,600 m (15,000 ft)
- Rate of climb: 4 m/s (790 ft/min)
