= Shahed 149 Gaza =

Iranian unmanned aerial vehicle

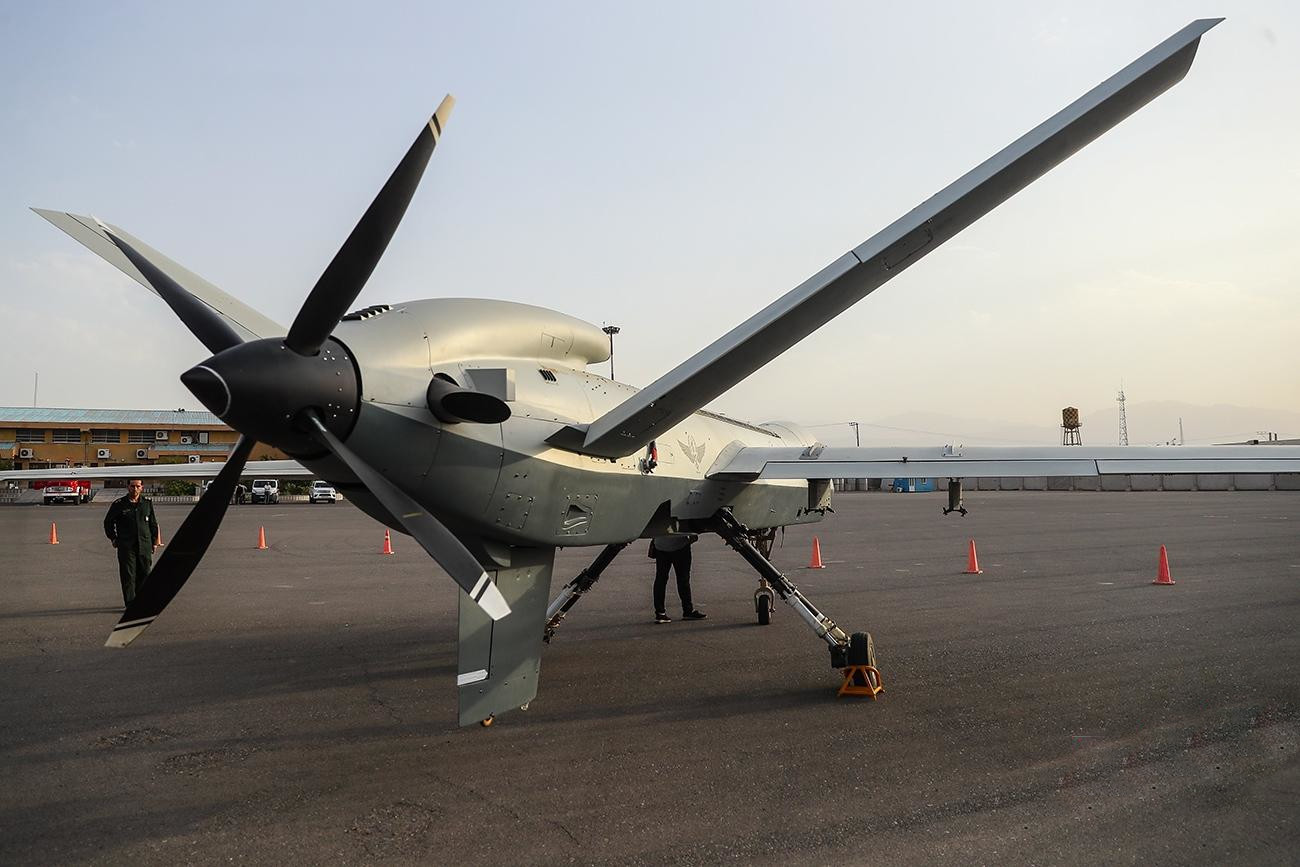
- Rear view of a Shahed 149 Gaza

General information
- Type: Unmanned combat aerial vehicle
- National origin: Iran
- Manufacturer: HESA
- Designer: Shahed Aviation Industries
- Status: Active
- Primary user: Islamic Republic of Iran Air Force, Islamic Revolutionary Guard Corps

History
- Manufactured: 3 as of April 2022
- Introduction date: April 2022
- Developed from: Shahed 129

The Shahed 149 Gaza (Persian: پهپاد غزه or شاهد ۱۴۹), is an Iranian unmanned combat aerial vehicle (UCAV) operated by the Iranian Revolutionary Guard. It was unveiled on 21 May 2021 and named after the Gaza Strip in honor of the Palestinians' struggle against Israel amid the 2021 Israel–Palestine crisis. It was delivered to the IRGC Aerospace Force in 2022.

The Gaza drone is a high-altitude long-endurance UAV similar in appearance and role to the American MQ-9 Reaper. It is larger and heavier than the earlier Shahed 129 and claimed to be more capable than its predecessor, which was similar to the MQ-1 Predator. It has a flight duration of 24 hours, a maximum operating radius of 2,500 km (1,562 miles), 21 m wingspan, 340 km/h maximum speed and is capable of carrying 13 bombs and 500 kg of electronic equipment. It is the first Iranian UAV powered by a turboprop engine.

== History ==
On February 23, 2020, a defense reporter for Tasnim News posted on Twitter that Iran was developing a drone called "Shahed 149". This is the first mention of the drone.

The drone was unveiled in May 2021.

The drone passed its flight tests in April 2022 and was accepted for service the same month.

== Specifications ==
Data from

General characteristics

- Crew: none
- Capacity: 1500 kg maximum weight of fuel and cargo
- Length: 10 m (32 ft 10 in)
- Wingspan: 21 m (68 ft 11 in)
- Height: 3.2 m (10 ft 6 in)
- Max takeoff weight: 3,200 kg (7,055 lb)
- Powerplant: 1 × Turboprop engine
- Propellers: 4-bladed

Performance

- Cruise speed: 340 km/h (210 mph, 180 kn)
- Range: 7,000 km (4,300 mi, 3,800 nmi)
- Combat range: 2,500 km (1,600 mi, 1,300 nmi)
- Endurance: 24h
- Service ceiling: 11,000 m (35,000 ft)

Armament

- Bombs: 13 bombs, internal atrium and rotating arm release device

Avionics

- Electro-optical/infrared sensors, including:
  - Day-vision camera with a zoom power of at least 100 to 120 times
  - Thermal imager camera
  - Laser rangefinder
- Environmental monitoring within a radius of 500 km
- Stealth aircraft detection up to a radius of 500 km
- Satellite communication antenna

== See also ==
- Defense industry of Iran

Related development

- Shahed 121
- Shahed 129

Aircraft of comparable role, configuration, and era

- MQ-9 Reaper
- BAE Systems Mantis
- CAIG Wing Loong II
- IAI Eitan
- Stella Tecnologia Atobá XR

Related lists

- List of military equipment manufactured in Iran
- List of unmanned aerial vehicles
