= HESA Kaman-12 =

Kaman-12 (UAV)
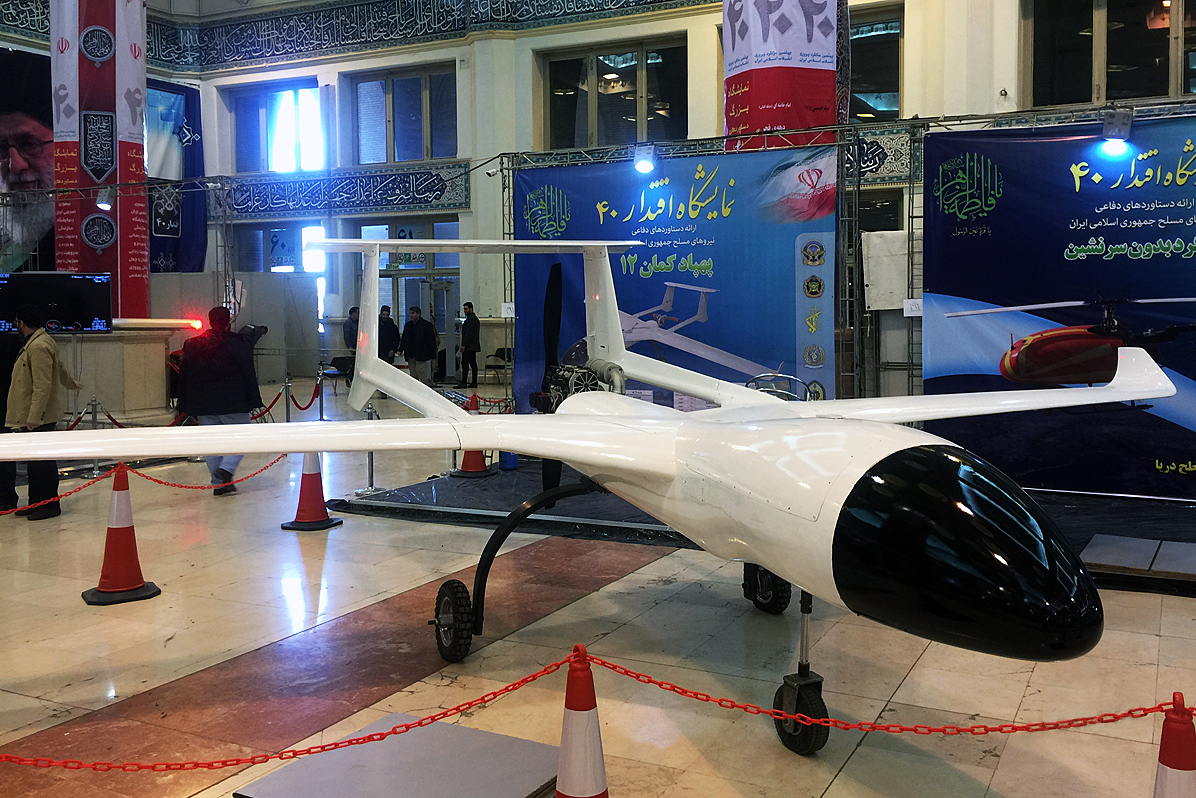
- Kaman 12 UAV seen during the Eqtedar 40 defense exhibition in Tehran.

General information
- Type: UAV
- National origin: Iran
- Manufacturer: HESA
- Status: In service
- Primary user: Iran

History
- Manufactured: 30 January 2019 (Was Unveiled)
- Introduction date: 30 January 2019
- First flight: 11 September 2020

The HESA Kaman-12 (Persian: پهپاد کمان-12) is an Iranian unmanned aerial vehicle operated by the Islamic Republic of Iran Air Force. Its first flight was on 11 September 2020. The unmanned aerial vehicle possesses a speed of 200 km/h, with a range of 1,000 kilometers, and its one-way range is approximately 2,000 km.

== Description ==
This UAV was first presented at the "Iqtedar-40" exhibition of defense achievements of the "Armed Forces of the Islamic Republic of Iran", and has a speed of about 200 kilometers per hour and a flight duration of 10 hours. Among this unmanned aerial vehicle specifications are as follows:

Capability to take-off from runways with at least a length of 400 meters, possessing an operating-radius of one thousand km, the capability to carry cargoes of 100 kg and its max-weight while taking off --from the ground-- is approximately 450 kg.

Another trait that has made this remote-controlled bird one of the most up-to-date UAVs is as follows: "Its 1000 kilometer flight range" and "2000 kilometer one-way range". As well as this, Kaman-12 has a lift coefficient of 1.8, acceleration tolerance limit: of 2-5 +, a maximum weight of remotely piloted aircraft of four hundred and fifty kg, minimum (UAV) weight of 230 kg, and other features.

== See also ==
- List of military equipment manufactured in Iran
- Armed Forces of the Islamic Republic of Iran
- Defense industry of Iran
- Akhgar (missile)
