= BQM =

BQM or Bqm can refer to:

- Kpwe language, spoken in Cameroon
- Duripan, a type of very hard soil often denoted as Bqm
- Bin Qasim railway station, a train station in Karachi, Pakistan
- Binary-quadratic-maximization, an optimization problem that can be used to perform L1-norm principal component analysis in statistics

== See also ==
- Several types of military unmanned aerial vehicles:
  - BQM-108
  - BQM-108A
  - BQM-108 VATOL
  - BQM-145 Peregrine
  - BQM-147 Dragon
  - BQM-147 Exdrone
  - BQM-155 Hunter
  - BQM-167A
  - BQM-167 Skeeter
  - BQM-34
  - BQM-34A Firebee
  - BQM-34 Firebee
  - BQM-74
  - BQM-74E Chukar
  - BQM-74 Chukar
  - BQM-90
- BM5 (New York City bus), a bus formerly called "BQM1"
- BQMS (disambiguation)
