= Denel Dynamics Skua =

Turbojet target UAV

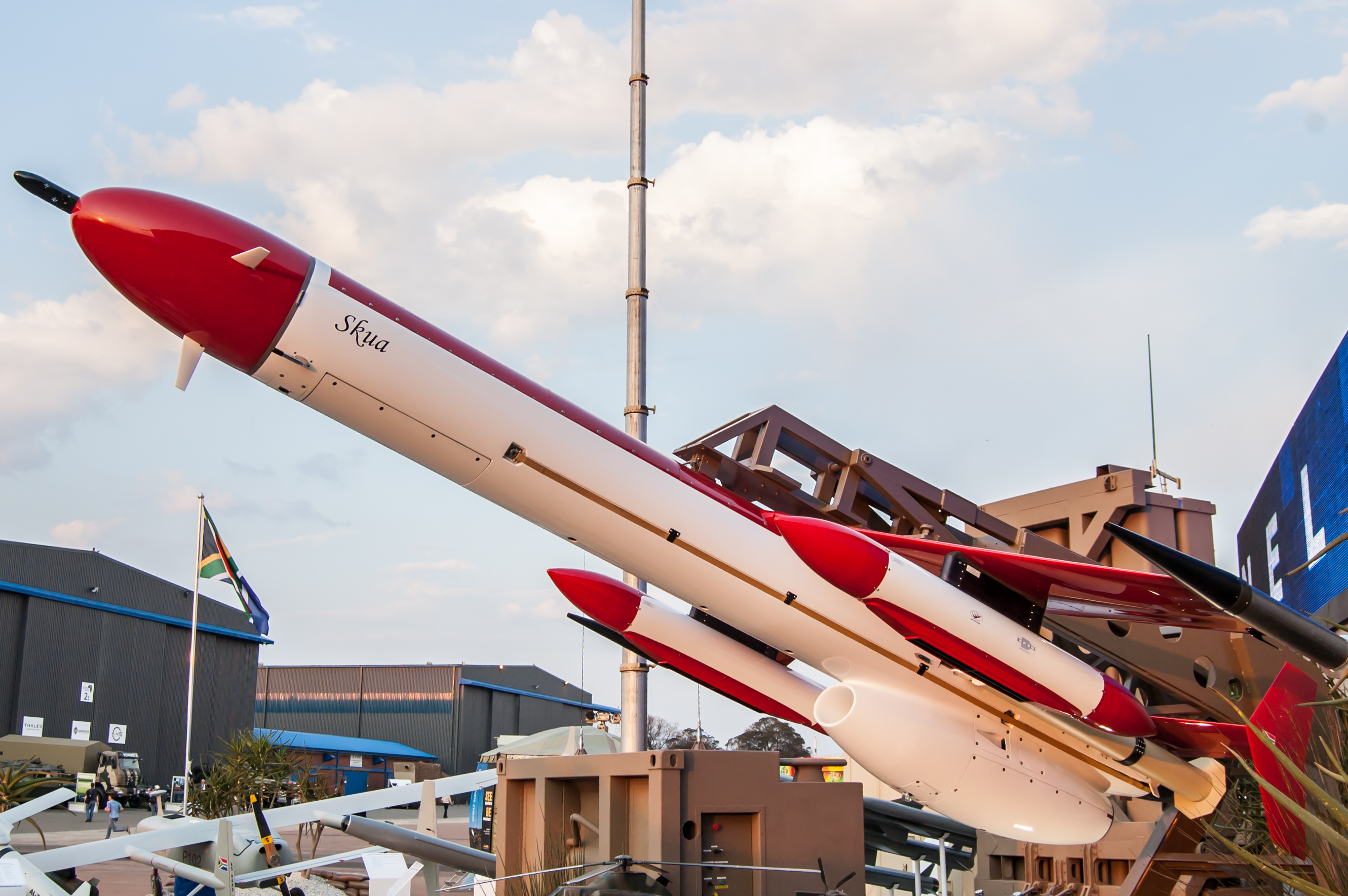
Denel Dynamics Skua

The Denel Dynamics Skua is a turbojet-engined target drone used to simulate fast-moving attack aircraft during surface-to-air and air-to-air training exercises and weapons tests. It is manufactured by the Denel Dynamics division of the South African state-owned Denel aerospace and defence conglomerate.

== Airframe ==
The Skua has a composite airframe, its wingspan is 3,57 m and length 6,00 m. Under-wing hardpoints can carry tow-targets and signature enhancement equipment up to 160 kg. An internal payload bay has a capacity of 70 kg. It is recovered by parachute and lands in an inverted position on airbags, this makes water landings possible.

=== Performance ===
- Maximum speed: Mach 0,86 at 10 000 m
- Controllable range: 200 km (line of sight)
- Altitude: from 10 m to 10 700 m
- Endurance: 85 minutes at 10 000 m and Mach 0,75

== System ==
The system includes between four and eight UAVs, a launcher vehicle, a mobile ground control station (GCS) and various support equipment.

The truck-mounted zero-length launcher includes an engine starter. The mobile GCS houses the flight control system and telemetry equipment used to control the aircraft. The GCS can control two drones in flight at the same time. Tracking the drones is by feedback from the on-board navigation system.

== Uses ==
- The Skua has been used during development of the A-Darter SRAAM.
- Testing of the Brazilian MAA-1 Piranha air-to-air missile.
- Testing of the Umkhonto surface-to-air missile by Denel Dynamics and for operational missile training by the South African Navy.

== Similar drones ==
- Beechcraft BQM-126
- Beechcraft MQM-107 Streaker
- HESA Karrar
- Geran-5
