= Kratos BQM-177 =

US Air Force aerial target drone

BQM-177
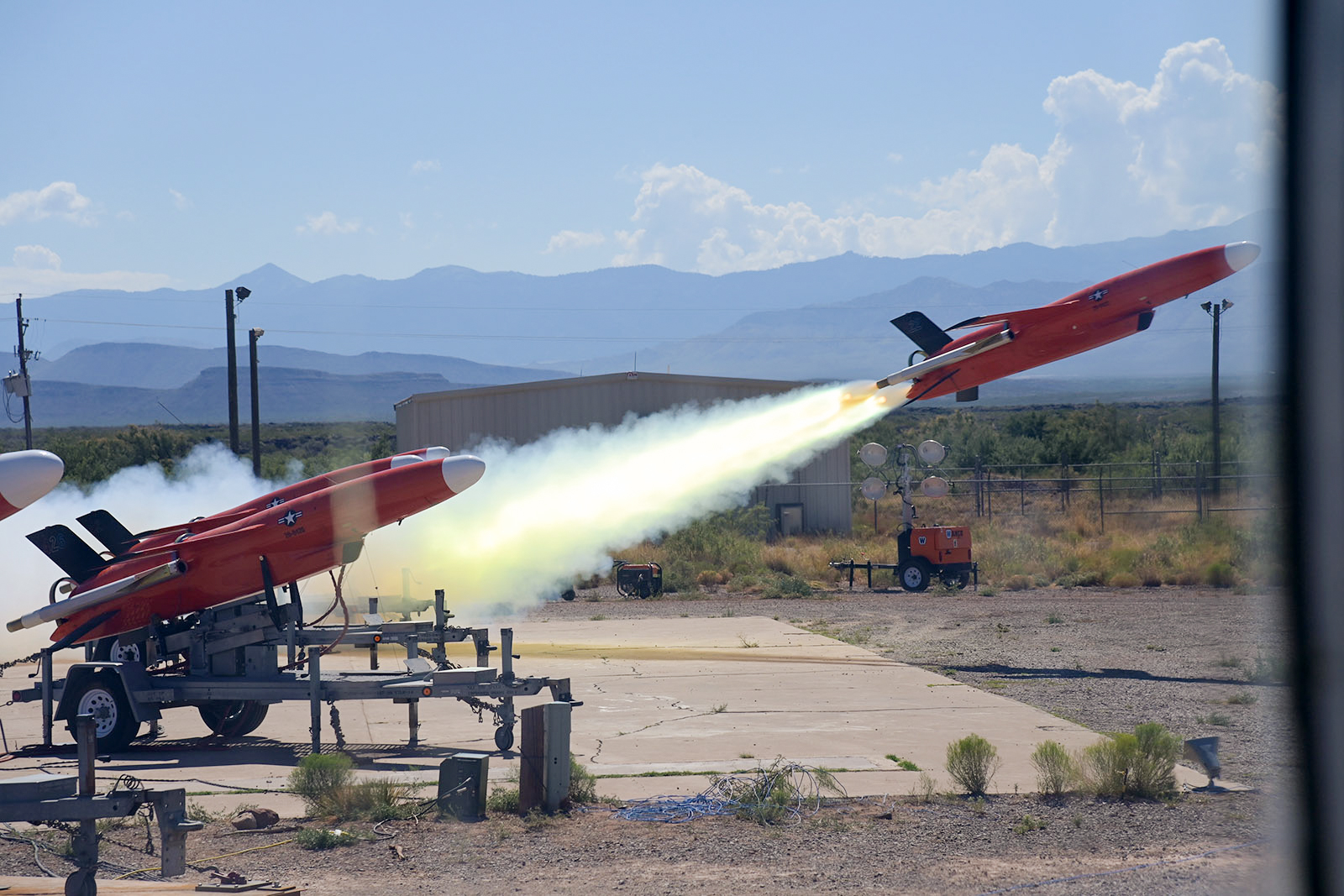
- BQM-177 being launched during a live fire test in 2022.

General information
- Type: Unmanned target drone
- National origin: United States
- Manufacturer: Kratos Defense & Security Solutions
- Status: In service
- Primary user: United States Navy

History
- Introduction date: 27 February 2019
- Developed from: Composite Engineering BQM-167 Skeeter

The Kratos BQM-177 is a subsonic aerial target drone (SSAT) for emulating anti-ship cruise missiles. It was developed by Kratos Defense & Security Solutions and is currently operated by the United States Navy as the BQM-177A. The variant intended for international customers is designated BQM-177i.

The BQM-177 is used by the US Navy to evaluate ship missile and air defense systems such as Aegis, SM-2 or SM-6.

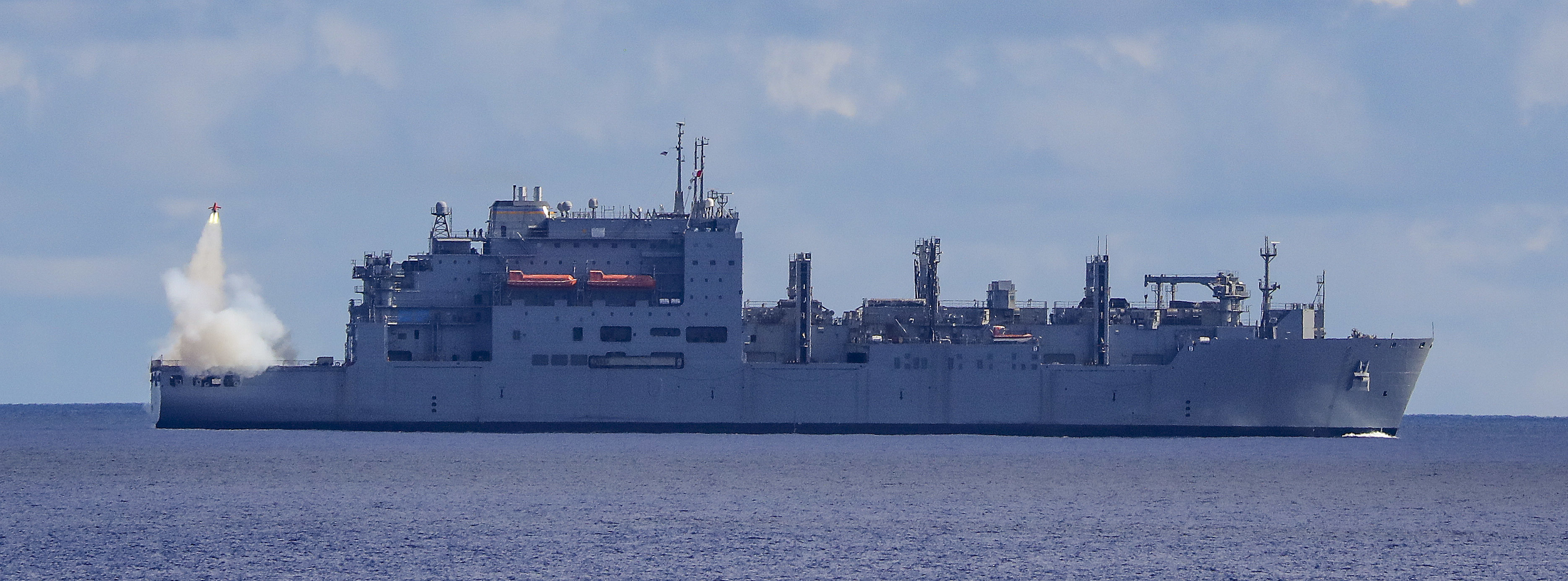
The USNS Alan Shepard launches a BQM-177A during an SM-2 exercise conducted in 2022 in the Philippine Sea.

== Operational history ==
The first BQM-177A was delivered to the US Navy in June 2018 as part of a low-rate initial production phase 1 contract, with early testing starting in July. The drone reached initial operational capability in February 2019. Full operational capability was achieved in 2022.

A contract awarded to Kratos in 2019 for low-rate initial production of 34 BQM-177A for a cost of $25.4 million, which was followed by subsequent contracts in 2020 of full rate production of 35 and 48 drone for $29.2 million and $38.7 million respectively. In 2021, a contract to provide 65 BQM-177A for $50.9 million included an allocation of seven drones for the government of Japan and eight for the government of Saudi Arabia. This was followed by a fourth full rate production contract for 55 vehicles for $49.5 million in 2023, again for the US Navy.

== Operators ==
United States

- United States Navy

Japan

- Japan Maritime Self-Defense Force

Saudi Arabia

- Saudi Arabian Armed Forces

== Specifications ==
Data from
• Kratos Defense data sheet

General characteristics

- Crew: None
- Length: 17 ft 0 in (5.18 m)
- Wingspan: 7 ft 0 in (2.1 m)
- Empty weight: 620 lb (281 kg)
- Max takeoff weight: 1,500 lb (680 kg)
- Fuel capacity: 63 gal
- Powerplant: 1 × MicroTurbo Tri 60-5+ turbojet, 1,000 lbf (4.4 kN) thrust

Performance

- Maximum speed: Mach 0.95
