= HESA Karrar =

Iranian target drone

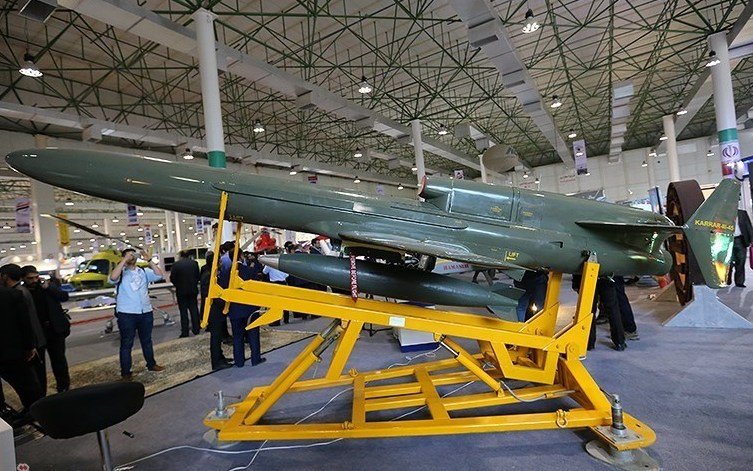
- Karrar UAV seen at the 8th International Iran Air Show on Kish Island in the Persian Gulf.

General information
- Type: Multirole
- National origin: Iran
- Manufacturer: Iran Aircraft Manufacturing Industrial Company (HESA)
- Designer: Iran Aircraft Manufacturing Industrial Company (HESA)
- Status: In production
- Primary users: Iran Hezbollah

History
- Manufactured: 2010
- Introduction date: 2010
- In service: 2010-present
- Developed from: Beechcraft MQM-107 Streaker; Denel Dynamics Skua

The HESA Karrar (Persian: کرار) is an Iranian jet-powered target drone manufactured by Iran Aircraft Manufacturing Industrial Company (HESA) since 2010. The Karrar is a derivative of the American 1970s-era Beechcraft MQM-107 Streaker target drone, probably incorporating elements from the South African Skua, with hardpoints added for munitions. The Karrar was developed during the Ahmadinejad presidency.

As a target drone, the Karrar is used to train air-defense crews by simulating an aerial target. The Karrar is regularly spotted at Iranian air-defense drills, and is believed to be the replacement for Iran's aging American-built MQM-107 target drones. Karrar jet unmanned-aerial-vehicles are recently equipped with Shahab-e-Saqeb (missile) and with the Majid heat-seeking 8 km range missile in order to hit air targets.

== Design ==
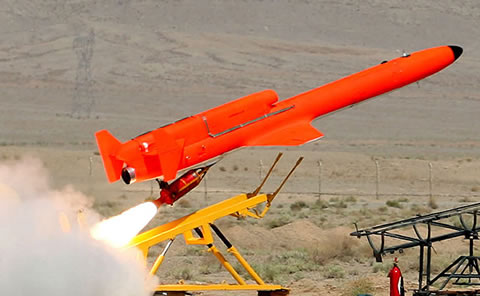
a Karrar, seen in the traditional blaze orange color of target drones, makes a Rocket Assist Take-Off (RATO)

The Karrar has a small, clipped delta wing mounted low to a cylindrical, blunt-nosed fuselage. It has a dorsal air intake for the engine and twin arrowhead-shaped endplate tailfins mounted high on the fuselage.

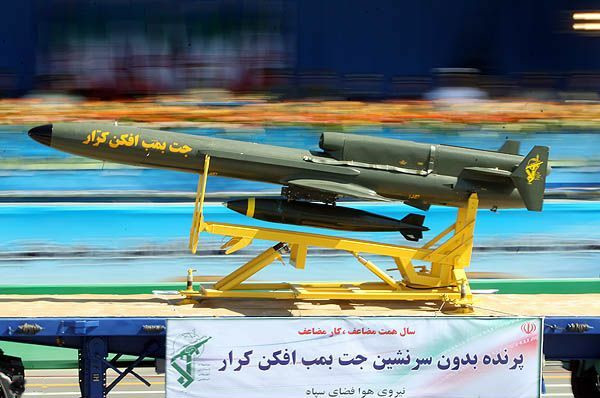
A Karrar with a Mk 82 bomb mounted on the centerline hardpoint.

The Karrar uses a rocket assist system to take off and is recovered by parachute. It is also claimed to be capable of air launch. Iranian officials have said the aircraft has surveillance capabilities, but the Karrar has no visible EO/IR sensors. The Karrar is believed to have an autopilot system with INS and/or GPS guidance, and may have terrain following capability as well. The Karrar is capable of both high and low altitude flight, and of day and night flight. It can follow a pre-programmed flight path, which can also be updated in flight.

The Karrar can carry one 500 lb Mk 82 general-purpose bomb, with claimed precision guidance, on its centerline hardpoint. Alternatively, it can carry two Nasr-1 anti-ship missiles, (Note: (or maybe only one, sources differ; see)) two Kowsar anti-ship missiles, or two 250 pound Mk 81 general-purpose bombs on the underwing stations, or (since 2019) a Balaban satellite-guided glide bomb. It is believed that carrying weapons substantially reduces the Karrar's operating range.

Military experts quickly noted that Karrar bears an obvious resemblance to the US Beechcraft MQM-107 Streaker target drone designed in the 1970s and exported to Iran before the Iranian revolution. According to a report from Denel Dynamics, however, the Karrar is not an exact clone of the MQM-107 Streaker as some design elements have been copied from the Denel Dynamics Skua as well. Technical data on the Skua was reportedly sold by one of the Skua's export customers to Iran. Overall, the Karrar is not an exact copy of the MQM-107, and multiple design changes have been made.

== Operational history ==
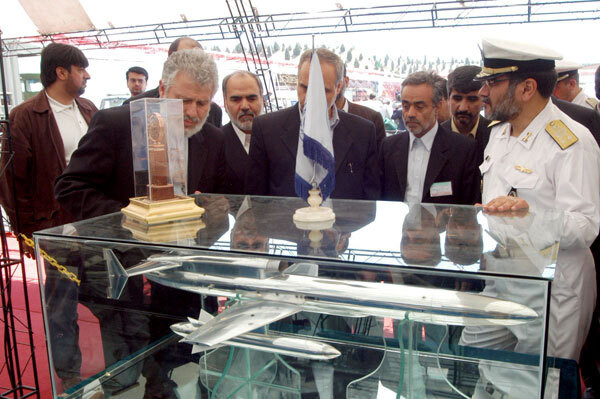
Iranian Minister of Defense Ali Shamkhani inspects a scale model of a Karrar prototype around 2004.

Development of the Karrar was underway as of 2002, possibly under the name "Hadaf-1". A subscale model of the Karrar was also seen around 2004. The Karrar is also known as the "Ababil Jet"; the Ababil is an unrelated UAV also offered by the same manufacturer, HESA. Iran said the Karrar took "500,000 hours" to develop, but independent analysts say this is unlikely.

The Karrar was unveiled on August 23, 2010, one day after the activation of a nuclear reactor in Bushehr, by Iranian president Mahmoud Ahmadinejad. It was framed as a "long-range bomber drone," and is the first long-range UAV manufactured in Iran.

Multiple sources report that the Karrar has been exported to Hezbollah. The Karrar has supposedly been used in the Syrian Civil War.

Defense Update suggests in particular that the Karrar could be useful for using cruise missiles to target ground-based radars and naval ships. In 2018, Daily Beast reporter Adam Rawnsley claimed that the Karrar, despite Iranian claims, does not possess the capacity to deploy weapons and is merely a target drone.

Today, Karrar is regularly used by Iran's air defense force for training. Karrar target drones have been used to test Mersad SAM systems, S-300PMU-2 SAM systems, Sayyad-2 SAM systems, Fakour-90 air-to-air missiles, and Sayyad-3 SAM systems.

Iran reportedly used the Karrar to deploy munitions for the first time in a 2020 exercise.

== Operators ==
- Iran
  - Islamic Republic of Iran Air Defense Force

=== Non-state user ===
- Hezbollah

== Specifications ==

Data from Jane's All the World's Aircraft: Unmanned 2014-2015

General characteristics

- Crew: none
- Capacity: 227 kg (500 lb) payload
- Length: 4 m (13 ft 1 in)
- Wingspan: 2.5 m (8 ft 2 in)
- Max takeoff weight: 700 kg (1,543 lb)
- Powerplant: 1 × Tolloue 5 or Microturbo TRI 60-5 turbojet , 4.2–4.4 kN (940–990 lbf) thrust (est.)

Performance

- Maximum speed: 900 km/h (560 mph, 490 kn)
- Range: 1,000 km (620 mi, 540 nmi)
- Combat range: 500 km (310 mi, 270 nmi)

Armament

- Hardpoints: 3 , with provisions to carry combinations of:
  - Missiles:
    2 × Kowsar
    2 x Nasr-1
  - Bombs:
    1 × Mk 82 PGM on centerline
    2 × 250 pound bomb
  - Other:
    1 × Mark 46 torpedo

== See also ==
- Shahed 129

Aircraft of comparable role, configuration, and era

- Galileo Mirach 150
- Tupolev Tu-300
- Alenia Aeronautica Sky-X
- WZ-2000
- Denel Dynamics Skua
- ADE Lakshya
