= LA 17 =

LA 17, LA-17, La-17 or LA17 may refer to:

- Lavochkin La-17, a Cold War-era Soviet jet unmanned aerial vehicle
- LA17, a postcode district in South Cumbria within the LA postcode area
- Louisiana Highway 17, a north–south route in northeastern Louisiana
- Louisiana's 17th State Senate district, a state senate district representing parts of Acadiana and the Florida Parishes
- Louisiana's 17th House of Representatives District, a district in the Louisiana House of Representatives representing parts of Ouachita Parish
- Constituency LA-17, a constituency of the Azad Jammu and Kashmir Legislative Assembly in Pakistan
