= AQM-128 =

1983–1984 aircraft development program

General information
- Type: Target drone
- National origin: United States
- Primary user: United States Navy
- Number built: 0

The AQM-128 was a short-lived program undertaken by the United States Navy for the development of a subscale target drone, launched from aircraft and capable of supersonic speed. The AQM-128 was intended to use pre-programmed guidance.

The program for development of the new target drone was begun in 1983; in January 1984, the designation YAQM-128A was approved for the program. The program was cancelled in April that year before any designs were selected.
