= SYS =

SYS may indicate:

- SYS (command), a DOS command used to make a medium bootable
- SYS Technologies, an information technology company
- ISO 639-3 code of the Sinyar language
- IATA code of the Saskylakh Airport
- .sys filename extension
- Sun Yat-sen
- Schaaf-Yang syndrome, a rare genetic disorder.
