= Kratos MQM-178 Firejet =

US Air Force aerial target drone

MQM-178 Firejet
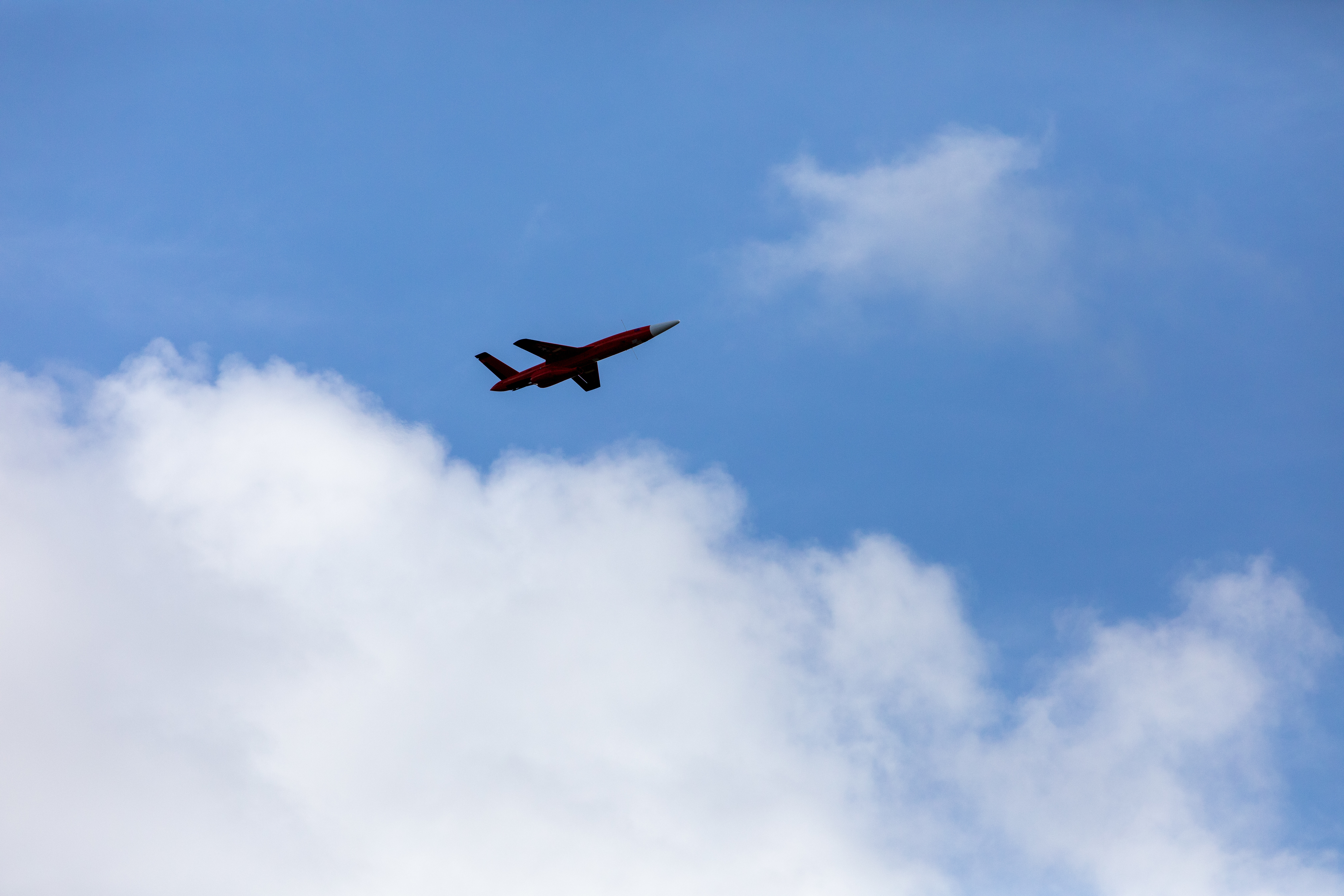

General information
- Type: Unmanned target drone
- National origin: United States
- Manufacturer: Kratos Defense & Security Solutions
- Status: In service
- Primary user: QinetiQ

History
- Introduction date: 2019

The Kratos MQM-178 Firejet is a subsonic aerial target drone for use in training against surface-to-air and air-to-air missiles. It was developed by Kratos Defense & Security Solutions, and is currently in service with several operators worldwide.

== Operational history ==
Pre-production MQM-178As were first used by QinetiQ during the 2017 Formidable Shield exercise; in July 2018 a production contract was signed by QinetiQ for delivery of MQM-178s over a ten-year period. In November 2018, a three-year contract, with an option for another six years, was signed by the Swedish Defence Materiel Administration for MQM-178A deliveries.

== Specifications ==
Data from

General characteristics

- Crew: None
- Length: 10 ft 10 in (3.3 m)
- Wingspan: 6 ft 3 in (1.9 m)
- Height: 2 ft 0 in (0.6 m)
- Empty weight: 130 lb (59 kg)
- Max takeoff weight: 320 lb (145 kg)
- Fuel capacity: 64.4l
- Powerplant: 2 × JetCat C81 turbojets, 81 lbf (0.36 kN) thrust each

Performance

- Maximum speed: Mach 0.69
- Service ceiling: 35,010 ft (10,670 m)
