= Noor (missile) =

- Type: Anti-ship cruise missile

Service history
- Used by: Iran; Syria; Hamas; Hezbollah

Production history
- Manufacturer: Iran

Specifications
- Warhead: 160 kg HE fragmentation Warhead
- Engine: turbojet engine
- Operational range: 30-220km depending on the model
- Flight altitude: Sea-skimming
- Maximum speed: Mach 0.9 (cruise); Mach 1.4 (terminal)
- Guidance system: Inertial navigation/active radar homing terminal guidance
- Launch platform: Ships/Ground-launchers/Planes

The Noor (Persian: نور) is a long-range anti-ship cruise missile manufactured by Iran. The missile is in primary service with the Iranian Navy. The missile is a reverse engineered Chinese C-802 anti-ship missile.

== History ==
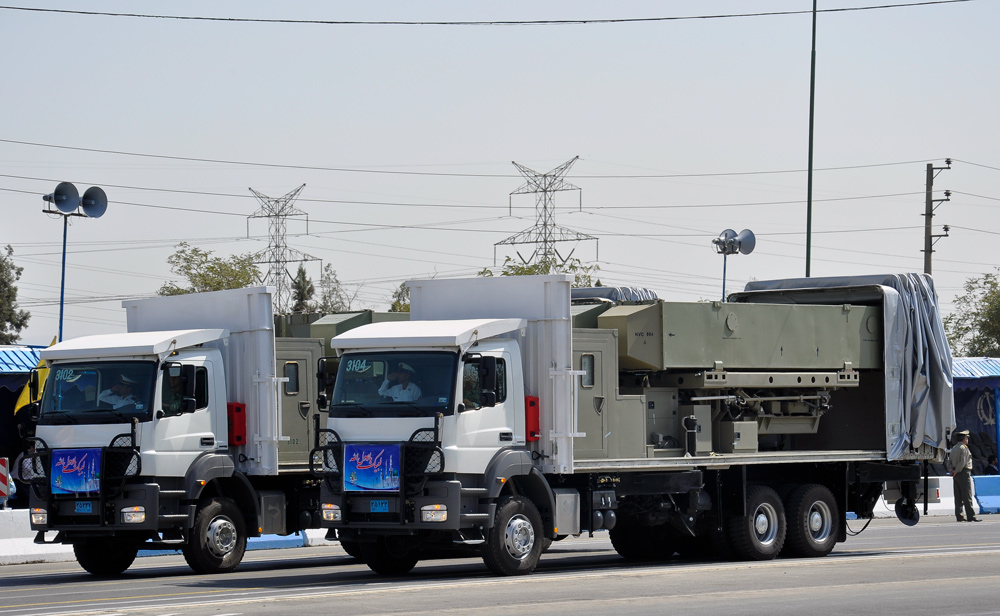
Transporter erector launcher (TELs) for Noor/Qader missiles. The TEL can be disguised as a civilian truck.

Iran was the first export customer of Chinese C-802 missiles. The contract was signed in 1995 but was cancelled due to U.S. pressure after 60 missiles had been delivered. After that, Iran started a program to reverse engineer the C-802.

It is unknown when the programme was finished, but in 2000 and early 2001, Iran tested an upgraded C-802 missile during Unity-79 wargames. Officials said that the range of the missile is increased from 30 to 130 kilometres (19 to 81 mi).

The missile is powered by Toloue-4, an Iranian version of the French Microturbo TRI 60 engine.

In January 2004, Iran announced that it has started manufacturing the DM-3B mono pulse radar for the Noor missile. According to Iranian officials, DM-3B is a millimeter-wave active radar used in the last stage of missile flight to find the target and home-in the missile on it. Because of its frequency, it is very hard to jam the radar, which is located inside the nosecone.

In 2006, it was announced that the missile's range has been increased further to 170 km (110 mi).

In 2011, another variant called Qader was unveiled by Iran with a range of 200 km (120 mi) and the ability to attack coastal targets. A video of the missile hitting its coastal target was published by the Iranian media.

In early 2012, during Velayete-90 wargames, a Noor missile was tested with improvements in electronic systems, a more jam-resistant radar and better target acquisition algorithms. A Qader missile was also tested in the wargame.

On 10 May 2020, the Iranian support vessel Konarak was struck by a Noor missile which was fired from the Jamaran in the Gulf of Oman close to the Strait of Hormuz, killing 19 of its crew and severely damaging the ship.

== Variants ==
- Basic Noor: Initial reverse-engineered missile with a range of 30 km (19 mi).
- Noor Phase 2: Improved version with 130 km (81 mi) range.
- Noor Phase 3: Further increased the range to 170 km (110 mi).
- Noor Phase 4: Better electronics and computer algorithms.
- Qader: An upgraded version with the range of 300 km (190 mi).
- Noor Export Version: A version with the range of 120 km (75 mi).

== Operators ==
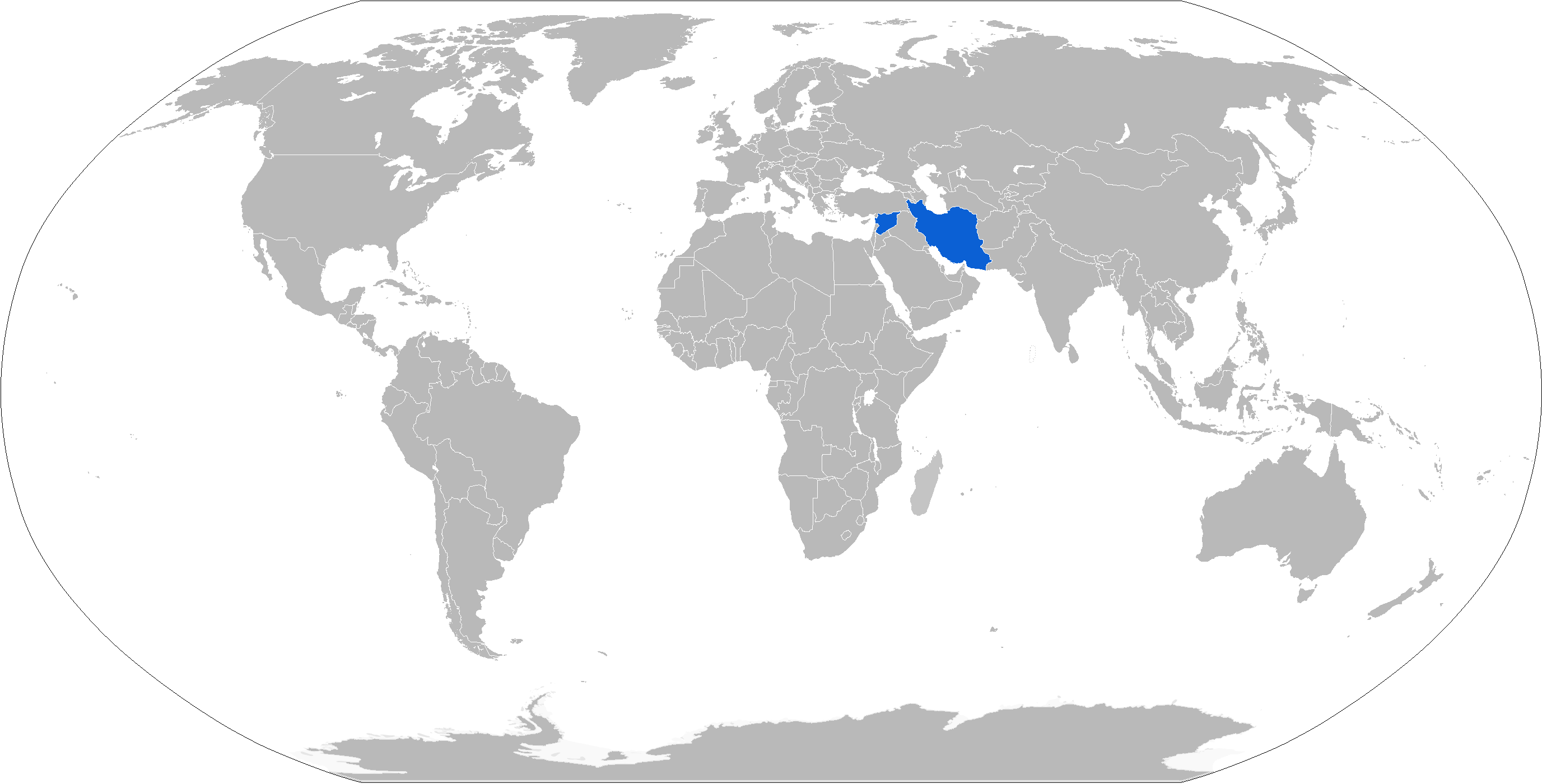
Map with Noor operators in blue

- Iran
- Syria – 25 ordered in 2006 along with 6 Tir II (IPS 18) fast attack craft. 10 delivered between 2009 and 2010.
- Houthis
- Hezbollah – Noor 2

== See also ==
- Defense industry of Iran
- Islamic Republic of Iran Armed Forces
- Islamic Revolutionary Guard Corps Aerospace Force
- List of equipment of the Iranian Army
- SAHA
