= Aérospatiale C.22 =

Aérospatiale C.22 is a subsonic target drone developed and manufactured by Aérospatiale since 1980, and used in testing the MBDA Aster missile. It is powered by a Microturbo TRI 60-02.

To ensure the tests of the Centre d'Essais de Landes in 1995, 74 targets including twenty C22, eleven Nord Aviation CT20 and twenty-seven Fox, were launched. It was last used in France in 2014. It is equipped with a towed target for the training of anti-aircraft gun crews and ground-to-air missile batteries.

== Specifications ==
Data from Jane's All the World's Aircraft 1982–83

General characteristics

- Crew: None
- Length: 5.25 m (17 ft 3 in)
- Wingspan: 2.50 m (8 ft 2 in)
- Height: 1.15 m (3 ft 9 in)
- Empty weight: 255 kg (562 lb)
- Max takeoff weight: 630 kg (1,389 lb) (maximum launching weight)
- Fuel capacity: 235 L (52 imp gal; 62 US gal)
- Powerplant: 1 × Microturbo TRI 60-2 turbojet, 3.4 kN (760 lbf) thrust
- Powerplant: 2 × jettisonable solid-fuel booster rockets , 28.3 kN (6,400 lbf) thrust each

Performance

- Maximum speed: Mach <0.95
- Endurance: 2 hr 30 min at 12,000 m (39,000 ft)
- Service ceiling: 14,000 m (46,000 ft)
- Time to altitude: 12,000 metres (39,000 ft) in less than 6 min
