= Beechcraft BQM-126 =

US Air Force aerial target drone

BQM-126
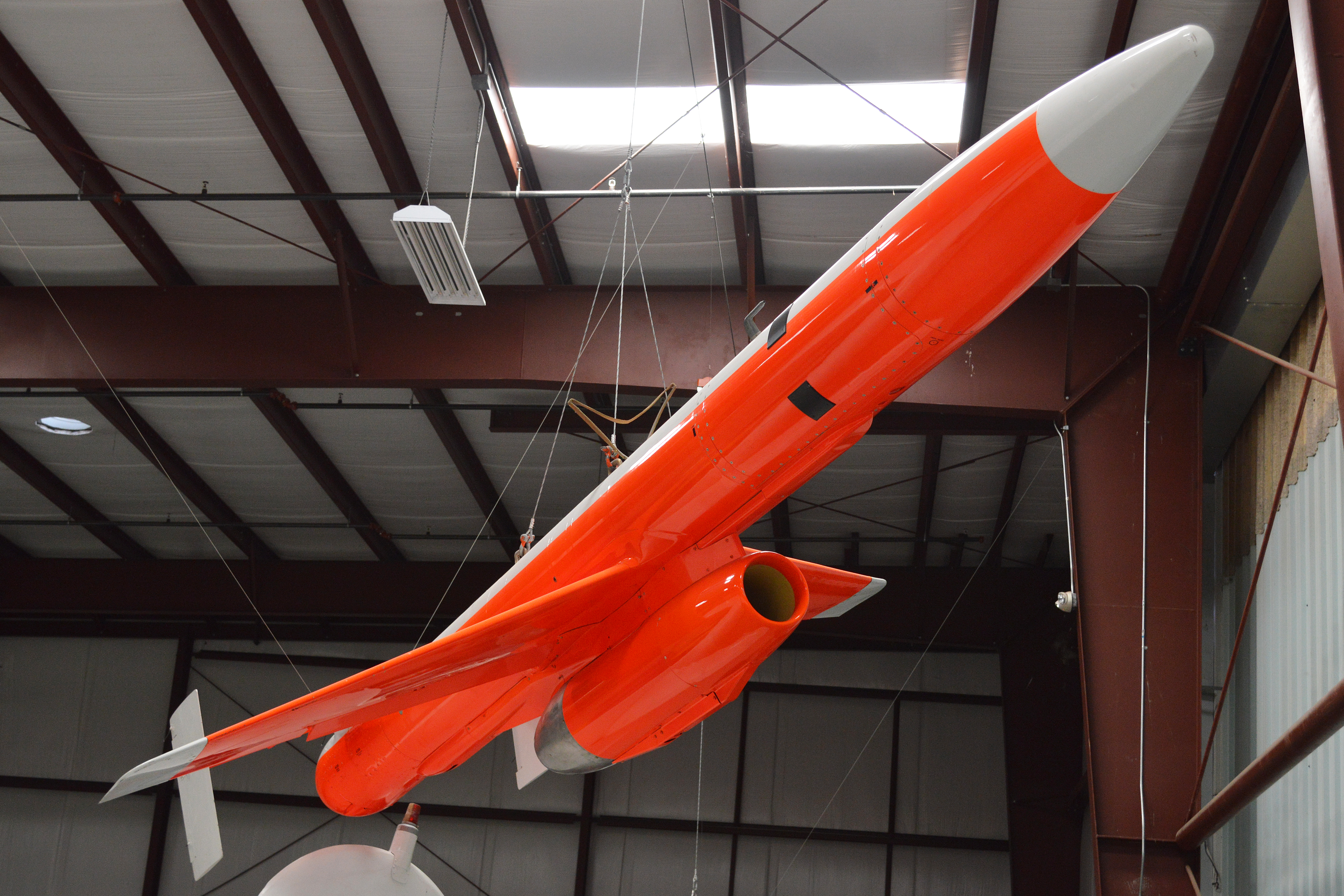
- BQM-126A at the Yanks Air Museum

General information
- Type: Unmanned target drone
- National origin: United States
- Manufacturer: Beechcraft
- Status: cancelled
- Primary user: United States Navy

History
- First flight: March 1984
- Developed from: Beechcraft MQM-107 Streaker

The Beechcraft BQM-126A, also known by the company designation Model 997, is a subsonic aerial target drone developed by Beechcraft for use by the United States Navy. No production of the type was undertaken.

== Design and development ==
The Beechcraft Model 997 was proposed in response to a 1983 United States Navy requirement for a target drone to replace the BQM-34 in service. Based on the Army's MQM-107 Streaker in design, the Model 997 was a low-wing pilotless aircraft, with a twin-tail configuration to reduce its height to assist in carriage by launching aircraft. A Microturbo J403 turbojet provided propulsion. Launch was from a carrier-based aircraft, although it could also be land- or ship-launched through the use of a solid rocket booster; landing, if the drone was not shot down, was by parachute.

== Operational history ==
The first flight of the Model 997 took place in March 1984; in 1985, the Navy ordered the drone into full-scale development, designating it BQM-126A. The first launch of a pre-production BQM-126A took place at the Pacific Missile Test Center on March 30, 1987; testing was delayed due to issues with subsystem designs, as well as Congressional cuts to the program's budget.

The BQM-126A was considered superior to the BQM-34S with regards to threat replication, and was intended to be significantly lower in cost as well. Orders for up to 700 aircraft were planned; however due to budgetary constraints, production of the BQM-126A was cancelled.

== Surviving aircraft ==
One surviving drone is on display at the Yanks Air Museum in Chino, California.

== Specifications ==
Data from

General characteristics

- Crew: None
- Length: 18 ft 6 in (5.64 m)
- Wingspan: 10 ft (3.0 m)
- Diameter: 1 ft 3 in (0.38 m)
- Empty weight: 540 lb (245 kg)
- Gross weight: 1,090 lb (494 kg)
- Max takeoff weight: 1,400 lb (635 kg) including booster
- Powerplant: 1 × Microturbo J403-MT-400 turbojet, 900 lbf (4.0 kN) thrust

Performance

- Maximum speed: 580 kn (670 mph, 1,070 km/h)
- Service ceiling: 40,000 ft (12,000 m)
