= NAI CK-1 =

CK-1

General information
- Type: Target Drone
- National origin: People's Republic of China (PRC)
- Manufacturer: Nanjing Aviation Institute

History
- Introduction date: 1970s
- Developed from: Lavochkin La-17

The NAI CK-1 (Chinese: 长空一号; pinyin: chángkōng yī hào; lit. 'long sky-1') is a target drone, and the first drone, developed by the People's Republic of China. It was derived from the Soviet Lavochkin La-17 unmanned aerial vehicle (UAV). Development started with the People's Liberation Army Air Force (PLAAF) in the early-1960s before being taken over by the Nanjing Aviation Institute (NAI) in 1968. It entered service in the late-1970s.

== Development ==
The PLAAF used Soviet-supplied La-17s for training since the late-1950s. China decided to reverse engineer and produce the UAV as the CK-1 when the Sino-Soviet split ended further supply. Development began in the early-1960s at the PLAAF's Weapon Test and Training Base under General Zhao Xu ("the father of the Chinese UAV".) Work was halted by the Cultural Revolution, and resumed in April 1967 at NAI. The first test launch occurred in late-1969, possible in October or 6 December, with trials completing in 1976. The drone entered the PLAAF's inventory in March 1977 but may not have received design certification until 1979.

The CK-1A radiation reconnaissance drone was developed in response to a March 1977 requirement to replace manned aircraft in the nuclear weapons testing air sampling role. China's 22nd nuclear test on 17 September 1977 was the first live test to use the drone; the drone passed through the mushroom cloud twice and landed safely.

The CK-1B low-altitude target drone for surface-to-air missile training began development in February 1980. It first flew on 18 May 1982 and formally entered the PLAAF's inventory in February 1983.

The CK-1C enhanced manoeuvrability target drone began development in May 1983. It first flew in September 1984 and underwent certification testing in February-March 1985.

== Variants ==
=== CK-1 target drone ===
The CK-1 features a number of changes to the La-17. Domestic autopilot and data link are fitted. The airframe is reinforced, and has revised fuel and electrical systems.

The La-17's RD-900 ramjet could not be reverse engineered. The ramjet is replaced by a non-afterburning variant of the WP-6 turbojet, the Chinese version of the Soviet Tumansky RD-9B used by PLAAF aircraft; this mirrors the development of the La-17M. Fighter engines nearing the end of their lives were converted for drone use.

The CK-1 makes rolling take-offs using a trolley. Later variants reduce the long take-off distance with a solid-propellant rocket booster. For comparison, the La-17 takes off from a launch ramp. The CK-1 uses a parachute recovery system.

=== CK-1A radiation reconnaissance drone ===
The CK-1A has an air sampling pod under each wing. The pods increased mass by 2,160 kilograms (4,760 lb), which was compensated for by increasing engine thrust to 4,960 pounds-force (22,100 N).

=== CK-1B target drone ===
The CK-1B low-altitude target drone is based on the CK-1A. The autopilot is modified to maintain low altitude flight, and fixed 160 litres (35 imp gal; 42 US gal) fuel tanks replace the air sampling pods.

=== CK-1C target drone ===
The CK-1C target drone's control system is modified to permit greater manoeuvrability and the fuel tanks are pressurized with engine bleed air to ensure flow. It demonstrated 4 g turns during testing. The fuselage is identical to the La-17M and has a lengthened engine nacelle.

Two underwing pods modify the drone's infrared signature, and are also equipped with reflectors, and light and smoke tracers. Two external fuel tanks are added.

=== CK-1E target drone ===
The CK-1E ultra-low-altitude target drone simulates terrain-following cruise missiles.

== Specifications (CK-1) ==
General characteristics

- Length: 8.44 m (27 ft 8 in)
- Wingspan: 7.5 m (24 ft 7 in)
- Height: 3 m (9 ft 10 in)
- Wing area: 8.55 m^{2} (92.0 sq ft)
- Gross weight: 2,060 kg (4,542 lb)
- Powerplant: 1 × WP-6 turbojet, 21.1 kN (4,740 lbf) thrust

Performance

- Maximum speed: 910 km/h (570 mph, 490 kn)
- Range: 937 km (582 mi, 506 nmi)
- Endurance: 45-60 minutes (high altitude); 70 minutes (low altitude)
- Service ceiling: 18,000 m (59,000 ft)

== See also ==
Related development

- Lavochkin La-17

Aircraft of comparable role, configuration, and era

- Ryan Firebee

Related lists

- List of unmanned aerial vehicles of the People's Republic of China

== Sources ==
- Gordon, Yefim; Komissarov, Dmitry (2008). Chinese Aircraft: China's aviation industry since 1951. Manchester: Hikoki Publications. ISBN 978-1-902109-04-6.
- Wood, Peter; Stewart, Robert (26 September 2019). China's Aviation Industry: Lumbering Forward (PDF). United States Air Force Air University China Aerospace Studies Institute. ISBN 9781082740404. Archived from the original (PDF) on 2021-06-28.
