= NSRDC BQM-108 =

American VTOL unmanned aerial vehicle

XBQM-108A
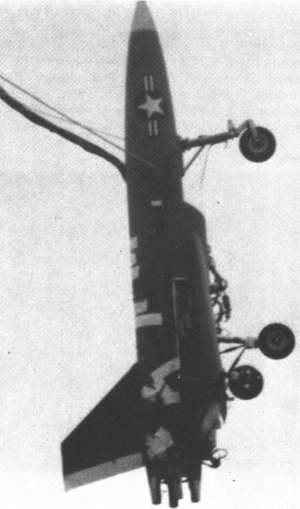

General information
- Type: Unmanned aerial vehicle
- National origin: United States
- Manufacturer: Naval Weapons Center
- Status: Canceled
- Primary user: United States Navy
- Number built: 1

History
- First flight: 29 September 1976
- Developed from: BQM-74 Chukar

The NSRDC XBQM-108A was an experimental VTOL unmanned aerial vehicle developed by the United States Navy during the 1970s. Although the XBQM-108A successfully conducted unmanned, tethered flight tests, the project was canceled before any free flights could be conducted.

== Design and development ==
The XBQM-108 project was initiated in 1975 by the Aviation and Surface Effects Department of the U.S. Navy's David W. Taylor Naval Ship Research and Development Center. The project was intended to demonstrate the practicality of the 'Vertical Attitude Take-Off and Landing' (VATOL), or 'tailsitter' flight profile for remotely piloted vehicles, as the Navy believed the increasing threat posed by cruise missiles required that aviation assets be dispersed among additional ships of the fleet, which would possess limited space for aviation operations as opposed to conventional aircraft carriers.

Based on the MQM-74 Chukar target drone, the XBQM-108A was modified with a revised, delta wing with canard control surfaces. The XBQM-108A was fitted with a thrust vectoring system based on the use of vanes that deflected the engine's exhaust; the aircraft retained the Chukar's recovery parachute and radio guidance system, with the addition of a radar altimeter and midcourse guidance unit based on that of the AGM-84 Harpoon anti-ship missile.

== Operational history ==
The XBQM-108A undertook its first, tethered flight on September 29, 1976. The flight, using fuel supplied through the tether from 42 US gallons (160 L; 35 imp gal) drums, was successful and demonstrated that the VATOL flight profile for unmanned vehicles was practical. However, the project was canceled before further testing could be conducted; the XBQM-108A conducted no free flights, or transitions to horizontal flight.

== Specifications ==
Data from

General characteristics

- Crew: None
- Length: 11 ft 9 in (3.58 m)
- Wingspan: 7 ft 3 in (2.21 m)
- Max takeoff weight: 560 lb (254 kg)
- Powerplant: 1 × Teledyne CAE YJ402-CA-400 turbojet, 660 lbf (2.9 kN) thrust

Performance

- Maximum speed: 400 mph (640 km/h, 350 kn) (estimated)
- Endurance: 30 minutes

== See also ==
Related development

- BQM-74 Chukar

Aircraft of comparable role, configuration, and era

- Ryan X-13 Vertijet

Related lists

- List of experimental aircraft
