= Integral Systems =

Human resource and accounting systems company

Integral Systems, Inc.
- Company type: Subsidiary
- Traded as: Nasdaq: ISYS
- Industry: Satellite ground systems Space communications Military communications
- Founded: 1982; 44 years ago, in Lanham, Maryland, U.S.
- Headquarters: Columbia, Maryland, United States
- Key people: Paul Casner (Interim CEO); William Bambarger (CFO); Peter Gaffney (EVP)
- Products: ABE; Archive Manager; ARES; EPOCH Client; EPOCH Database; EPOCH Triggers & EPOCH Web Server
- Revenue: ▲US$160.17 Million (2008)
- Operating income: ▲US$25.10 Million (2008)
- Net income: ▲US$18.17 Million (2008)
- Total assets: US$147.20 Million (2008)
- Total equity: US$110.04 Million (2008)
- Number of employees: 769 (December 2008)
- Parent: Kratos Defense & Security Solutions (2011–present)
- Website: www.integ.com

Integral Systems, Inc. was an American manufacturer of satellite ground systems founded in 1982, and based in Columbia, Maryland, United States. The company had supported over 205 satellite missions for communications, science, meteorological and earth resource applications. Integral's customers included government/commercial satellite operators, spacecraft/payload manufacturers and aerospace systems integrators. The company offered a commercial off-the-shelf (COTS) software product line for command and control, and employed approximately 769 people in the United States and Europe.

On July 27, 2011, California-based Kratos Defense and Security Solutions completed the acquisition of Integral Systems, with each outstanding share of Integral Systems common stock cancelled and converted into the right to receive (i) $5.00, in cash, without interest, and (ii) 0.588 shares of the Kratos Defense and Security Solutions common stock.

== Company structure ==
Integral Systems operated through four business segments: Ground Systems – Government; Ground Systems – Commercial; Space Communications Systems, and Corporate. The company was involved in contracts with governmental and commercial satellite operators, which included the US Air Force, and Northrop Grumman.

Integral owned five subsidiaries that provide a services and products to the satellite industry. SAT Corporation, a subsidiary of Integral, that provided satellite and terrestrial communications signal monitoring systems to satellite operators. The Newpoint Technologies Inc. subsidiary supplied equipment monitoring and control software to satellite operators and telecommunications firms. Integral Systems’ RT Logic subsidiary built telemetry processing systems for military applications such as tracking stations, control centers, and range operations. Integrals’ Lumistar, Inc., subsidiary primarily designs and manufactures board-level telemetry products for PCI, VME, cPCI, and ISA computer buses. Subsidiary CVG-Avtec built and integrated satellite communication terminals and related equipment, including ground station hardware.

Integral Systems failed to disclose to its shareholders for over seven years that Gary A. Prince (“Prince”), who had previously been convicted of conspiracy to commit securities and bank fraud and enjoined from committing securities fraud in a civil action brought by the Commission, was an executive officer of the Company. Integral Systems failed to disclose Prince’s role at the company and his securities fraud background in its periodic reports and proxy statements filed from 1999 through August 8, 2006

In 2006, Integral's then-CEO and chairman, Steven R. Chamberlain, was convicted of felony sex offenses involving a minor and resigned. Chamberlain died in December 2009, according to U.S. District Court records

Integral built a $992,000 five-story, 125,000 sq. ft. tenant fit-out of a core and shell office building in Columbia Gateway Office Park in Columbia, Maryland. The company relocated from their original Lanham, MD office to the Columbia, MD new corporate headquarters in May 2009. However, by February, 2011, the need to drive down operating costs forced Integral Systems to return to the Lanham facility and sublease the majority of their former headquarters facility.

On July 27, 2011, Integral Systems merged with Kratos Defense & Security Solutions. At the time of the acquisition, the 600 to 700 Integral Systems employees were expected to join the 4,000 employees of Kratos Defense and Security Solutions.

== Subsidiaries ==
- SAT Corporation - supplied of automated RF signal monitoring systems for satellite and terrestrial spectrum management applications.
- Newpoint Technologies - supplied of software and systems for equipment M&C (Monitoring and Control).
- RT Logic - supplied of signal processing systems with applications in satellite test, launch, and on-orbit operation of satellites.
- Lumistar - offered products that process telemetry down-links for the flight, test, airborne, and satellite ground station markets.
- CVG-Avtec - a subsidiary of Integral Systems that focused on deployable satellite communications solutions.

== See also ==
- Kratos Defense & Security Solutions
