= Shahab-e-Saqeb (missile) =

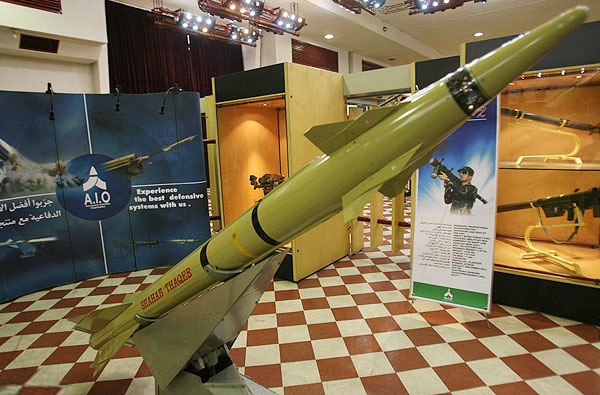
- Type: Low altitude surface-to-air missile, short range air-to-air missile
- Place of origin: Iran

Production history
- Designer: Defense industry of Iran

Specifications
- Mass: 84 kg
- Length: 2.9 m
- Propellant: solid fuel
- Operational range: 500 - 12,000 m
- Maximum speed: 740 m/s

Shahab-e-Saqeb, (Persian: موشک شهاب ثاقب) is an Iranian-made low altitude surface-to-air missile which was designed by Defense industry of Iran. This air defense missile was designed to engage a range of targets at low altitudes.

The Shahab-e-Saqeb uses radio-guidance in the line of sight. It is about 2.9 meters in length, it weighs 84 kilograms and its speed is approximately 740 meters per second. This missile has a range of 10 kilometers against targets travelling at a speed of 300 meters per second and 11 kilometers against helicopters.

"Shahab-Saqib" is launched via systems such as "Ya-Zahra and Herz-9", mobile, short to medium range air defense assets. The Karrar unmanned-aerial jet were recently equipped with this missile in order to engage air targets.

== See also ==
- List of military equipment manufactured in Iran
- Armed Forces of the Islamic Republic of Iran
- Defense industry of Iran
- Karrar
