= TEM Toloue-4 =

Iranian-made turbojet engine

Toloue-4
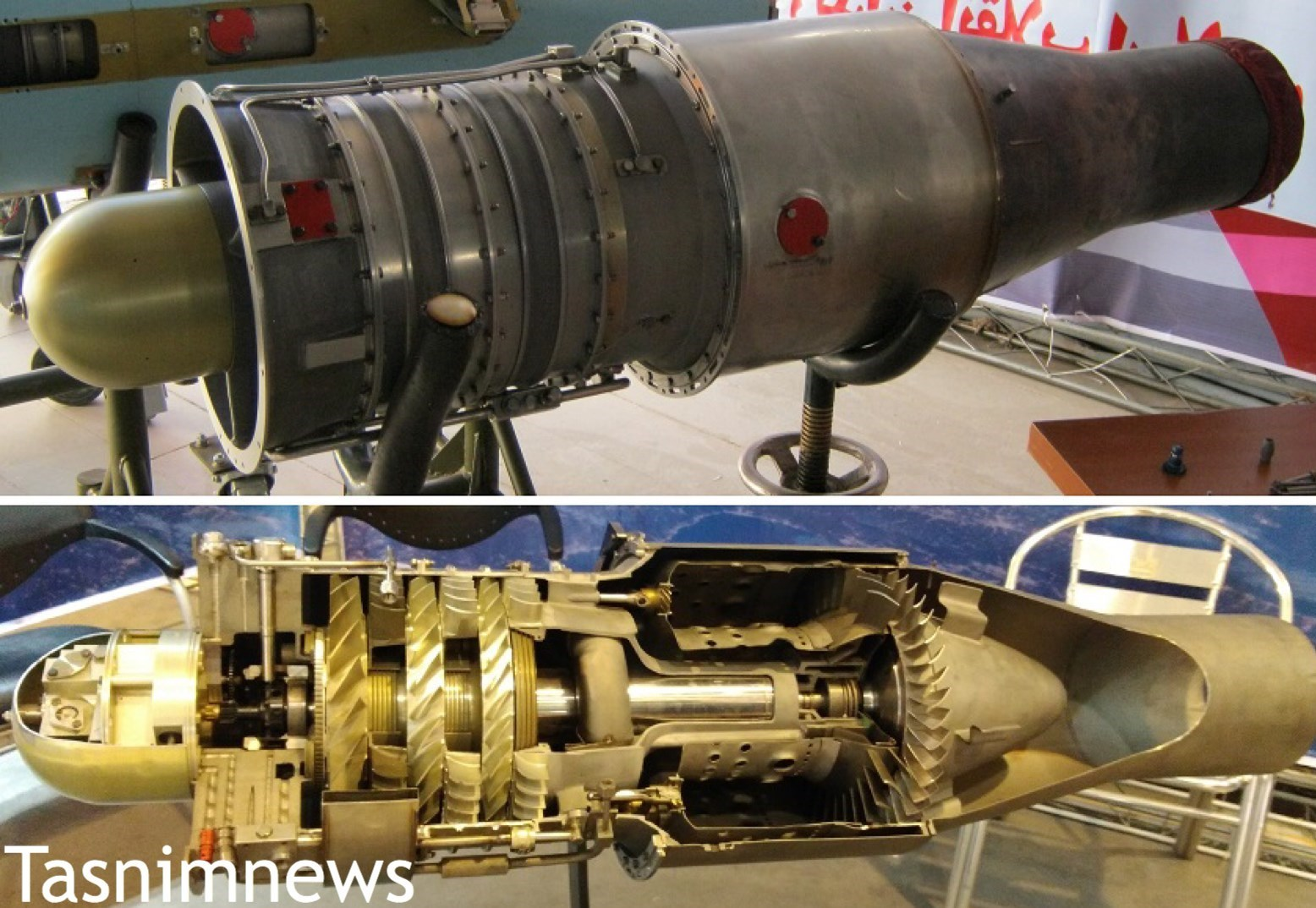
- Type: Turbojet
- National origin: Iran
- Manufacturer: Turbine Engine Manufacturing (TEM)
- Major applications: Noor (missile)
- Developed from: Microturbo TRI 60

The Toloue-4 (Persian: طلوع, Dawn) is one of the first indigenously produced jet engines in Iran. The Toloue-4 mini turbojet is built at Iran Aircraft Industries's (IACI) engine industries (TEM). It represents a significant step in Iran's development of domestic aerospace technology.

== Design ==
The engine is a copy of the French Microturbo TRI 60 engine and is used in Noor anti-ship cruise missiles as well as UAVs. It is a three-stage axial design with a length of 1.3m that can produce 3.7 kN of thrust at 29,500 RPM and weighs 54.7 kg. A throttleable and more durable version named Toloue-5 turbojet engine is a further development with a thrust of 4200-4400 N, i.e. approximately 428-449 kgf

== Specifications ==
- Type: Mini turbojet engine.
- Thrust: Capable of producing 3.7 kN of thrust at 29,500 RPM.
- Dimensions:
  - Length: 1.3 meters.
  - Weight: 54.7 kg.
- Configuration: Three

== See also ==
- IAIO Owj
