= BQM-90 =

Cancelled aircraft

The BQM-90 was an unmanned aircraft proposed for use as a target drone by the United States Armed Forces. Developed during the 1970s, no aircraft were built before the project was cancelled.

== Overview ==
The BQM-90 project was begun in 1970 under the designation ZBQM-90A; the intent of the program was to create a supersonic, high-altitude target drone for use in testing air-to-air and surface-to-air missiles. It was to be launched from the ground or the air, using a turbojet powerplant, and would be controlled by either ground-baser or airborne control stations. The requirements for flight performance were increased during development; eventually the specification called for the BQM-90 to simulate a sea skimming anti-ship missile at Mach 1.3 or a high altitude missile travelling at a speed of Mach 3 and an altitude of 80,000 feet (24,000 m). At the end of a flight the drone was to deploy a parachute, allowing it to be recovered and re-used.

ZBQM-90A program was cancelled in 1973 due to a lack of funding.

== See also ==
- List of missiles
