= BQM-147 Dragon =

Type of reconnaissance drone

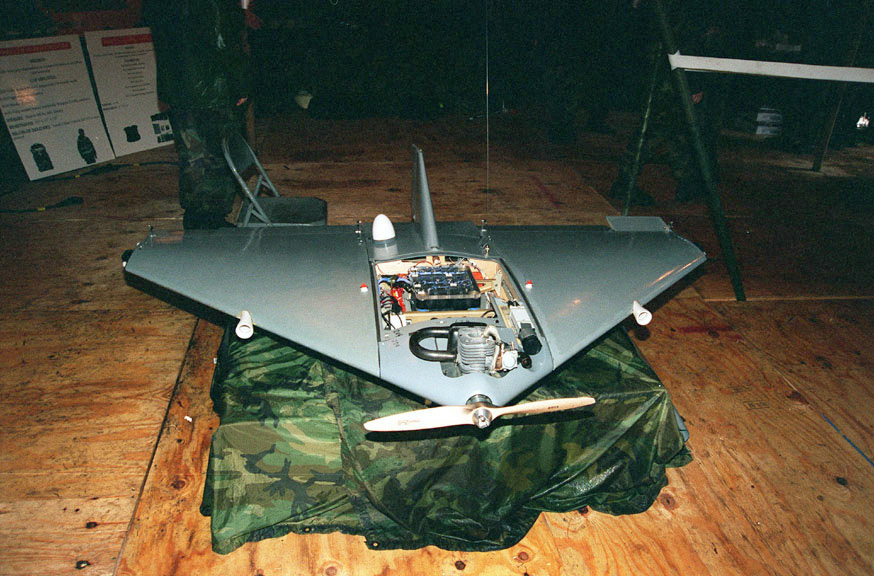

General information
- Type: Reconnaissance drone
- National origin: United States
- Manufacturer: BAI Aerosystems
- Primary user: United States Marine Corps
- Number built: 500+

The BAI Aerosystems (BAIA) BQM-147 Dragon unmanned aerial vehicle is a tactical battlefield UAV operated by the United States Marine Corps. Originally designed as an expendable communication jammers, they were converted into a reconnaissance role with the addition of a camera.

== Development ==
The Dragon began life in 1986, when the US Marines Corps contracted with the Applied Physics Laboratory (APL), an offshoot of Johns Hopkins University in Baltimore, Maryland, that works on government technology development contracts, to build a small piston-powered UAV as an "expendable jammer" for battlefield electronics warfare. The program was logically named "ExJam". BAI Aerosystems was a subcontractor to APL and provided airframe parts.

"Creeping featurism" infected the program as the Marines considered more applications for the little drone, and in 1987 the program was given the new name of BQM-147A "Expendable Drone" or "Exdrone". The communications-jammer configuration of the vehicle was tested in the University of Maryland Glenn L. Martin wind tunnel, and successfully completed developmental flight testing at Naval Air Station Patuxent River and a combined Developmental Test/Operational Test at White Sands Missile Range. However, APL wasn't able to meet the schedule requested by the Marines for fielding the Exdrone, and so the program was passed on to BAI Aerosystems, with the Navy assisting by developing a video imaging system for tactical reconnaissance.

The NASA Langley Flight Research Center also assisted in the development effort, performing wind-tunnel tests and making recommendations for aerodynamic improvements, and after these changes the BQM-147A Exdrone went into service with the Marines in time to help them chase the Iraqis out of Kuwait City. A few years later, the UAV-JPO also bought several hundred Exdrones for demonstrations and training to help get tactical officers in tune with battlefield UAV capabilities.

The current "Dragon Drone" is an improved version of the Exdrone, obtained through a 1996 contract with the Marines. BAI renamed the UAV since the Exdrone wasn't really all that expendable, given that it carried a reasonably sophisticated sensor system and flight avionics. The Dragon Drone is a flying wing with a single tailfin that is symmetrically designed to allow it to fly with either side up.

The Dragon Drone is powered by a small piston engine. It can carry one of three different plug-in turrets, featuring daylight color TV with a laser rangefinder, daylight color TV, or infrared imager. It can also be fitted with an auxiliary fuel tank for increased range.

== Condor ==
The United States Coast Guard is now procuring a "navalized" version of the Dragon Drone under the name "Condor", and intends to use it with Coast Guard cutters and similar small ocean-patrol vessels. The Condor will be useful for missions such as search and rescue or hunting drug traffickers.

Launching and recovering a UAV off such small vessels is troublesome. Naval UAVs have traditionally been launched with a catapult or RATO boosters, and recovered using a net. Not only is this approach unsuited to smaller vessels, it is also not particularly reliable even on large vessels, with catapult launches causing drone damage, catapult failures leading to loss of the drone, and recoveries similarly leading to damage through collisions and unintended ditching.

A Saint Louis, Missouri, company named Advanced Aerospace Technologies Incorporated (AATI) has come up with an alternative scheme for launching and recovering a Dragon Drone or other small UAV from small vessels. The scheme involves the use of a parasail and is referred to the "runway in the sky (RITS)". In AATI demonstrations, a Dragon Drone is attached to a piggyback frame that harnesses the drone to the parasail. The parasail is reeled out into the wind until it reaches an altitude of about 250 meters (820 feet). The drone is then released, diving until it builds up enough speed for the operator to pull it out of the dive and sent it on its mission.

In recovery, the parasail is used to lift a tow line into the sky, with the tow line trailing a series of recovery lines hanging between the parasail and the ship. The drone is flown into the recovery lines, and a snaplock mechanism on the drone's wing grabs onto a line. The drone is then reeled back down to the ship. The tow line has more "give" to it than a recovery net, reducing the likelihood of damage.

The current RITS scheme can handle UAVs weighing up to 180 kilograms (400 pounds), but AATI thinks it can be scaled up to handle larger aircraft. AATI claims the system is inexpensive and easy to use. They also point out that the parasail could also be used to loft an antenna to allow over-the-horizon communications with a UAV. Whether the Coast Guard intends to use this scheme or not is uncertain, but it certainly is an interesting concept.

== Specifications ==
Data from Unmanned Aircraft Systems Roadmap 2002–2027, Office of the Secretary of Defense, p.15

General characteristics

- Crew: None
- Capacity: 15 pounds (6.8 kg)
- Length: 5.25 ft (1.60 m)
- Wingspan: 8.2 ft (2.5 m)
- Empty weight: 90 lb (41 kg)

Performance

- Maximum speed: 80 mph (130 km/h, 70 kn)
- Range: 30 mi (48 km, 26 nmi)
- Endurance: 2.5 hours
- Service ceiling: 10,000 ft (3,000 m)
