= Iran Aircraft Industries =

Iranian aviation company

Iran Aircraft Industries (IACI) or SAHA (صها abbreviated of صنایع هواپیمایی ایران) was established in 1961 mainly for major repair of fighter, passenger, and air support planes. Over time, SAHA became an important part of Iran’s aviation industry. In 1998, Iranian scientists and experts started designing, engineering, and manufacturing complex engine parts, airplane parts, and manufacturing turbine engines like Toloue-4.

SAHA is currently working on turbo prop engines called TV-3 for IrAn-140 planes.

Accomplishments:

- Production of 100% Iranian made turbofan jet engine MD-80 class in 2014, comparable to JT8D-219 jet engine
- MAPNA CFM 56 type
- Mass production of Toloue-4 mini jet engine
- Toloue 10 and 13
- Owj (Zenith) engine, GE J85, J79; PW TF30 maintenance
- Jahesh-700 (Leap) 7 kN 1574 lbf turbofan FJ turbojet
- TV3S, AL-, RD33 93, AI D- MS, D30
- Repairing Dart engines
- Building repair lines to repair heavy engines like Astazo (Turbomeca Astazou), F, and Solar.
- Capability to repair aircraft like Boeing 747

== See also ==
- Iran Aviation Industries Organization
- Iranian Military Industry
- Airlines of Iran
