= SYS Technologies =

Information technology company

- Type: Subsidiary
- Industry: Information Technology
- Founded: 1966
- Headquarters: San Diego, California
- Key people: Clifton L. Cooke Jr., CEO & President; Edward M. Lake, CFO; Kenneth D. Regan, President, Defense Solutions Group; Michael W. Fink, Sr. VP of Fin. and Contracts and Corp. Sec
- Products: Remore Asset Management; Surveillance; Sensor Networking; Finance; Systems engineering Wireless; Security
- Revenue: ▲$45.8 Million (2005)
- Net income: ▲$526,000 (2005)
- Owner: Kratos Defense & Security Solutions (2008 - present)1
- Number of employees: 475 (2006)
- Website: www.systechnologies.com

SYS Technologies (AMEX: SYS), also known simply as SYS, provides information technology products through services and wireless communication systems for the Department of Defense, Department of Homeland Security and various commercial customers. For large commercial customers in the telecommunications, utilities, construction, chemical, and biomedical industries, its products and services are used to manage remote assets. SYS also provides financial and management services, primarily to U.S. government customers. Since the company was founded, it has been based in or around San Diego, California.

== History ==
Founded in 1966 as Systems Associates, Inc., the company became SYS Technologies in 1985.

In recent years, the company has embarked on a strategy of growth through acquisitions. It acquired Polexis in March 2004, and acquired Xsilogy in December 2004. It then bought Antin Engineering in January 2005, Logic Innovations in November 2005, cVideo in December 2005, and Reality Based IT Services, Ltd. in April 2006. Its most recent acquisition was Ai Metrix in October 2006.

On March 3, 2008, SYS Technologies became a wholly owned subsidiary of Kratos Defense & Security Solutions.
