= Lavochkin La-17 =

Target drone family

La-17
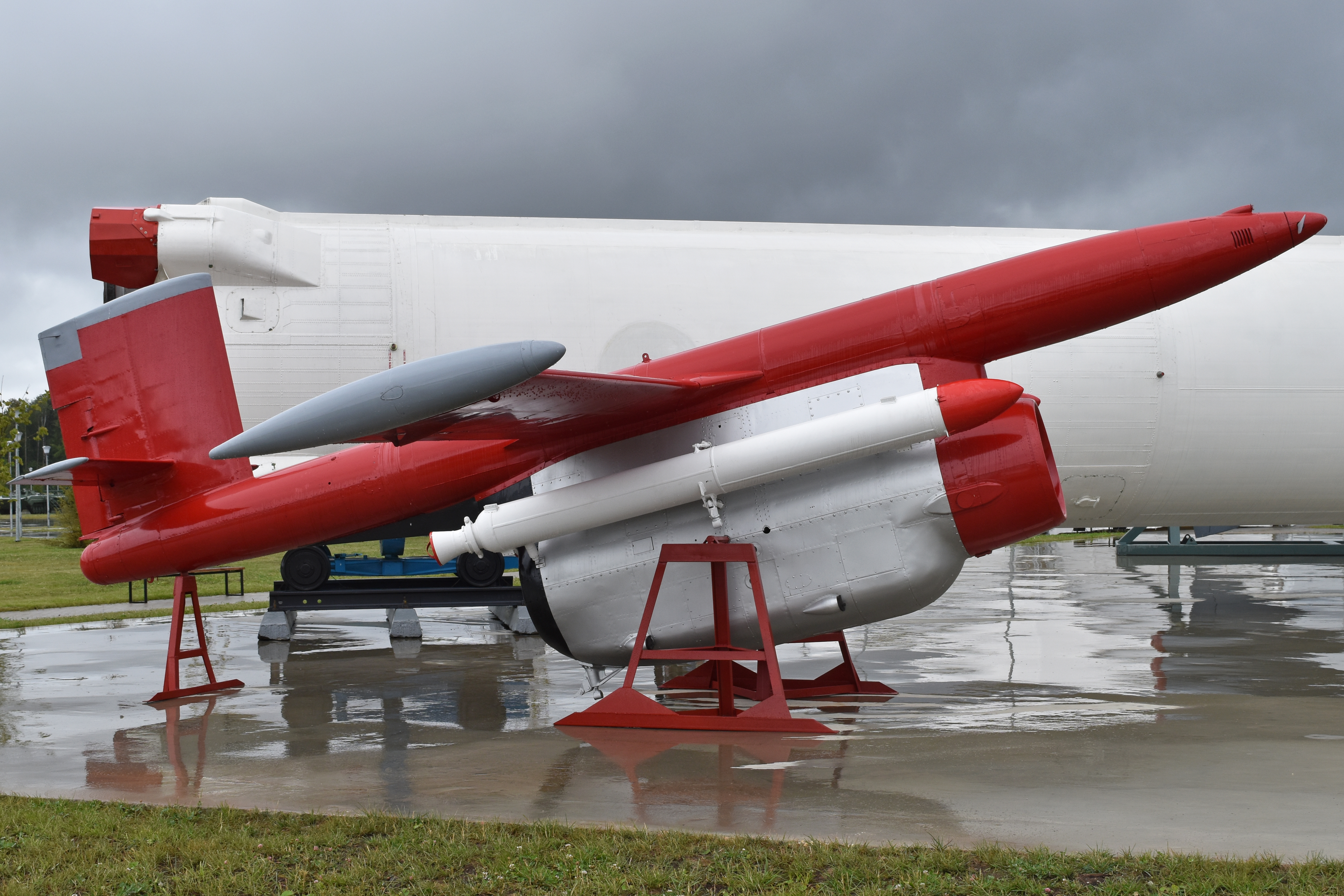
- La-17 on display in Kubinka

General information
- Type: UAV
- National origin: Soviet Union
- Manufacturer: Lavochkin
- Primary user: Soviet Air Force

History
- First flight: 1953

The Lavochkin La-17 was the first Soviet unmanned aerial vehicle (UAV) to reach operational service. The first versions were developed in the early 1950s, and remained in service into the 1980s.

== Early development ==
The La-17 was designed by the Lavochkin design bureau, with work beginning in 1950. Flight tests began in 1953, with prototype drones carried on a Tupolev Tu-4 four-engine bomber. La-17 production began in 1956.

The La-17 was a jet drone of all-metal construction, with straight flight surfaces, and a jet engine carried in a nacelle under the fuselage. The initial variant, which was just known as the "La-17", was air-launched. and powered by a Bondaryuk RD-900 ramjet with 800 kgf (1,760 lbf) thrust. There was a "windmill" type electric generator in the nose, somewhat along the lines of the WW II-era Luftwaffe's Me 163 manned rocket interceptor to provide electric power. The La-17 was directed by radio control and simply "bellied in" to land, with the engine taking the abuse of the touchdown. The ramjet was strictly expendable and easily replaced. The drone could carry Luneburg lenses to give an enhanced radar signature.

== La-17M ==
The original La-17 was only marginally effective, and air launch was expensive and logistically clumsy, making simulations of "mass attacks" with drones difficult at best. The ramjet engine was thirsty, resulting in such short endurance that if a fighter pilot missed the drone on his first pass, it would have run out of fuel before he could come around again. To address these problems, Lavochkin engineers came up with a ground-launched variant, the La-17M, which performed its initial flights in 1959 and went into service in 1960. The La-17M was launched using a RATO booster under each wing root, from a four-wheel towed launcher derived from the carriage of a standard 100 millimeter antiaircraft gun.

The La-17M was powered by a Mikulin RD-9BK turbojet with 1,950 kgf (4,300 lbf) thrust; the RD-9BK was a derated, non-afterburning, and simplified version of the RD-9B engine used on the MiG-19 fighter. There were teardrop fairings on the wingtips used for compressed air that would be fed to the engine to improve the flight ceiling. Flight endurance improved from the 40 minutes of the La-17 to 60 minutes. As with the La-17, the La-17M bellied in to land.

Early production La-17Ms did not have an autopilot, so were quickly replaced by the La-17MA, which did. Later production featured the RD-9BKR engine, with the same performance as the RD-9BK but with some minor changes to permit low-level operation, and a service life improved from 15 to 30 hours. They also featured an improved landing control system that caused the UAV to "nose up" before touchdown, as well as a landing skid under the engine nacelle. These two refinements permitted landings with much less risk of engine damage. These machines were designated La-17MM and went into service in 1964.

A number of old ramjet-powered La-17s were updated for ground launch, with the twin RATO boosters and some airframe reinforcements. These drones were redesignated La-17n.

== La-17R ==
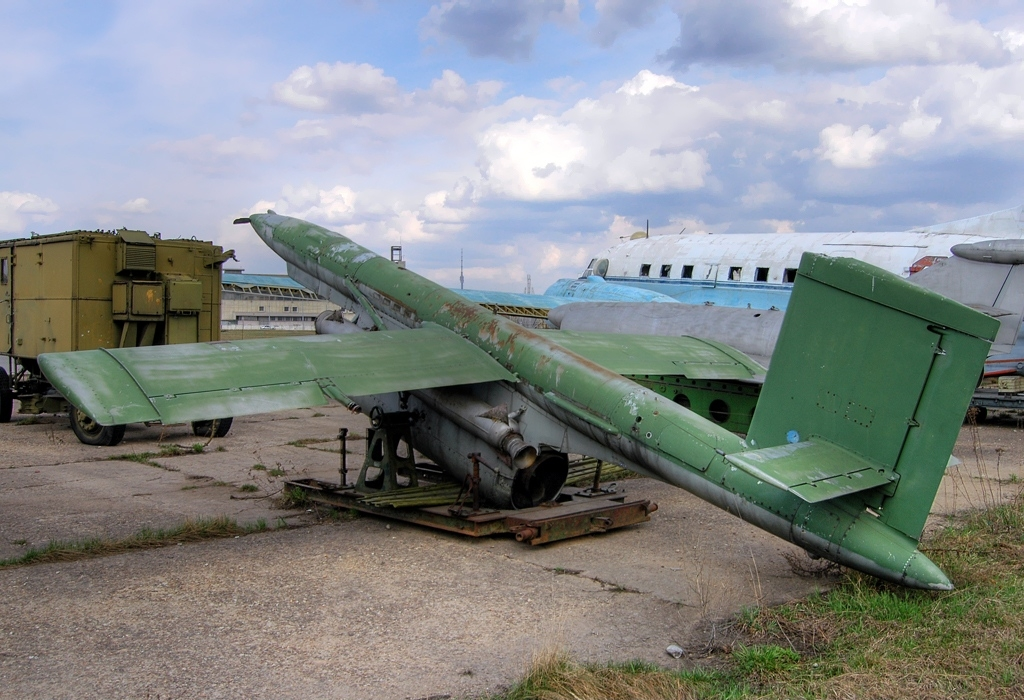
Lavochkin La-17R UAV at Khodynka Field, Moscow

Early on, development work was initiated to use the ramjet-powered La-17 as the basis for an air-launched reconnaissance drone, but because of the model's deficiencies, it did not happen. However, a ground-launched battlefield reconnaissance drone based on the La-17MM, the La-17R, was introduced in 1962. It featured a nose stretched by 54 cm (22 in) to accommodate a reconnaissance payload. Ultimately a number of different payloads were developed, including high resolution or wide area film cameras, a real-time TV camera, and a radiation monitoring instrument. The La-17R did not have the wingtip compressed air pods for high altitude operation. An improved version of the La-17R, the La-17RM, was introduced in 1965, featuring some of the refinements of the La-17MM target drone.

== La-17UM and -17RU ==
The evolution of the target and reconnaissance variants of the La-17 progressed along two paths, with the result that commonality between the two branches of the family diverged. In order to rationalize production and logistics, a target drone designated the La-17UM and a reconnaissance drone designated the La-17RU were manufactured that were designed for the maximum parts commonality.

These were the last La-17s built by the Lavochkin OKB, but not the last La-17s built in the USSR. The Lavochkin OKB became more and more involved in the development of space systems and the production of La-17s proceeded on "autopilot" into the late 1970s, until availability of RD-9BK engines was exhausted, so that it was no longer possible to build the La-17 as it was.

== La-17K ==
A group of Soviet aerospace organizations then came up with the R11K, an expendable non-afterburning version of the Tumanskiy R11F-300 turbojet, used on first-generation Mikoyan MiG-21 fighters, and the La-17 was redesigned to be fitted with this engine. The Sokol design bureau (OKB) began production of this reengined La-17 in the late 1970s. To the armed services it was still an La-17MM, but had an internal OKB designation of La-17K. The R11K engines were rebuilds of retired R11F-300 engines.

The La-17K remained in production into the early 1990s. It apparently remains in lingering use in Russian service.

== Exports ==
It does not appear that the La-17 family was widely exported, though La-17RM reconnaissance drones were exported to Syria in the 1980s.

The Chinese also obtained the La-17, and in fact built it themselves, though not under a license agreement. In the late 1950s, a number of La-17s had been handed over to the People's Republic of China. When stocks began running low in the later half of the 1960s, when relations with the USSR were generally poor due to Sino-Soviet split, an effort was begun to reverse engineer the La-17 and build it in China. The resulting product, the Chang Kong (Blue Sky) CK-1, was introduced to service in 1966. It was powered by the WP-6 engine, which was a Chinese copy of the RD-9B and featured some system changes from the original La-17s used as a pattern. It also featured a parachute recovery system.

The CK-1 was quickly followed by the CK-1A, which had underwing pods for additional kit. A CK-1B was introduced into service in 1983 that was optimized for low-level flight and had non-jettisonable underwing fuel tanks. It was followed by the CK-1C, with a much improved control system to provide much more maneuverability, as well as reinforcement to withstand maneuvering stresses.

A La-17 was under restoration at the National Museum of the U.S. Air Force as of June 2008.

== Operators ==
=== Current operators ===
- China
- Russia
- Turkmenistan

=== Former operators ===
- Soviet Union
- Syria

== Specifications (La-17M) ==
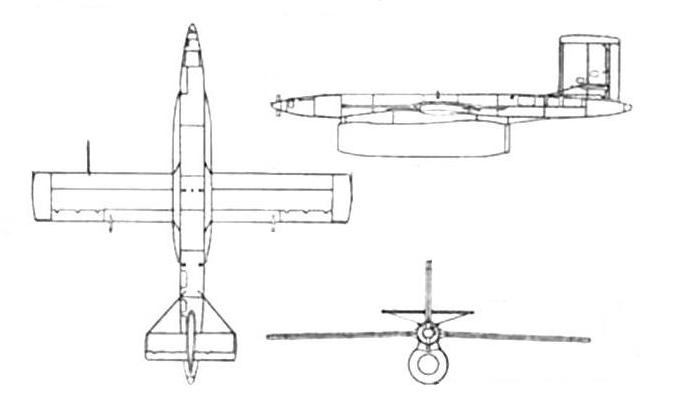

General characteristics

- Crew: None
- Length: 8.44 m (27 ft 9 in)
- Wingspan: 7.50 m (24 ft 7 in)
- Gross weight: 3,065 kg (6,758 lb)
- Powerplant: 1 × Tumansky RD-9BK , 19.2 kN (4,300 lbf) thrust

Performance

- Maximum speed: 900 km/h (560 mph, 490 kn)
- Endurance: 1 hours
- Service ceiling: 17,000 m (55,800 ft)
