= Microturbo TRI 60 =

Turbojet engine for missiles, target drones, and UAVs

Microturbo TRI-60
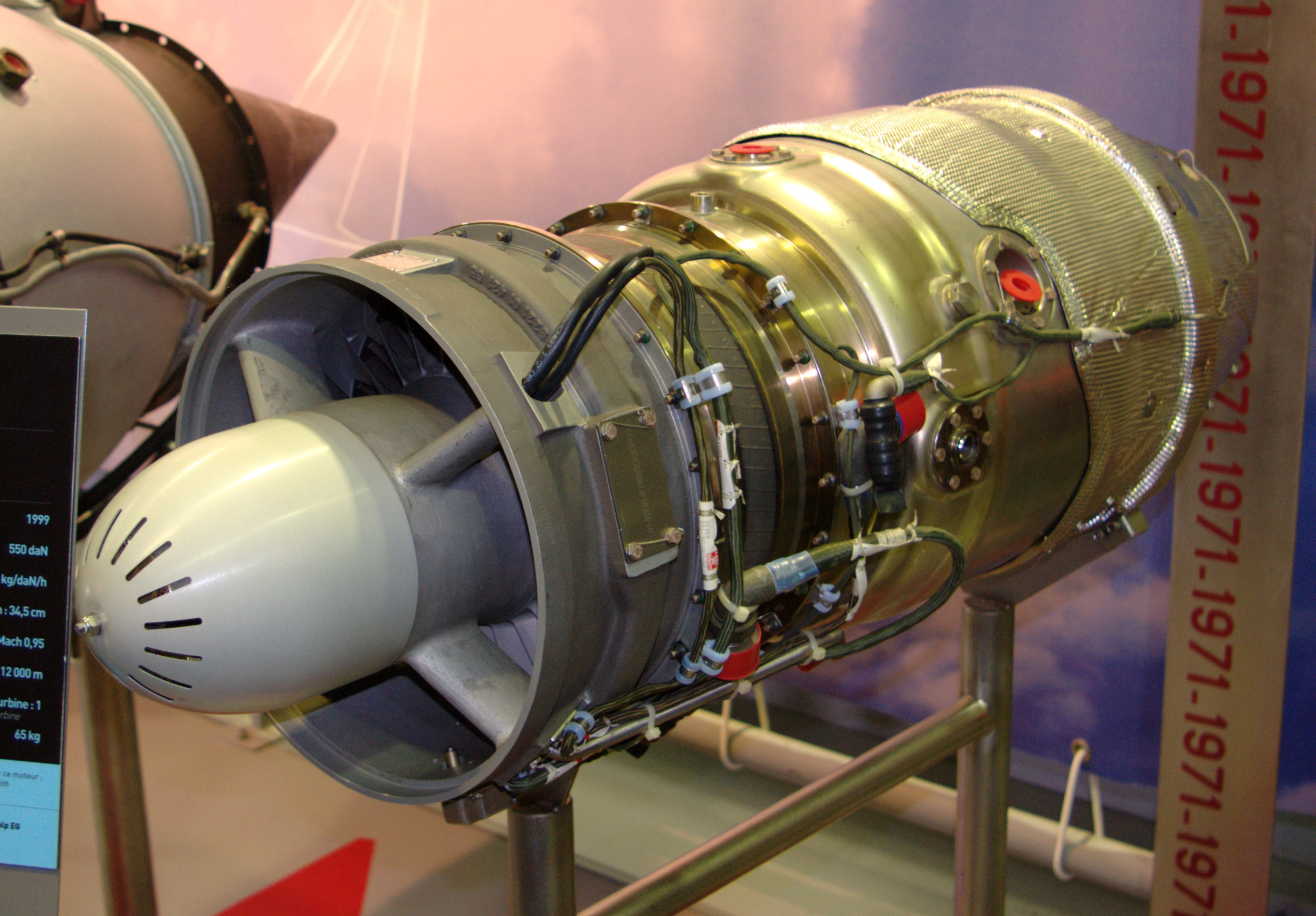
- Type: Single Spool Turbojet
- National origin: France
- Manufacturer: Microturbo
- First run: 6 June 1974.
- Major applications: Storm Shadow / SCALP EG; RBS-15
- Variants: Microturbo TRI-40

The Microturbo TRI 60 is a small, expendable turbojet engine developed for use in cruise missiles, target drones, and other small unmanned air vehicles. Variants of this engine produce from 3.5 to 5.3 kN (790 to 1,190 lbf) of thrust. The engine first ran in 1974.

== Development and design ==
=== Tri-Axial ===
The TRI 60 engine was developed in the 1970s to meet the need for a small, inexpensive, reliable, and expendable jet engine for use in cruise missiles and other small unmanned air vehicles. This need was broken down into the key requirements for high production at low cost and a high thrust-to-weight ratio. The first generation of engines, the "tri-axial" engines, were named that way because they featured only three simple compressor sections. The engine overall only has 20 major components. These first engines, the "-1", "-2", and "-3" variants, were used in many different applications (list below in the "Variants" section).

The latest version of the tri-axial engine, the "-5" and the "-5+" variants are the only tri-axial models still in production. One significant change from the early models to these later ones is the use of an ECU to monitor the performance of the engine and adjust fuel flow accordingly.

=== Quadri-Axial ===
In the late 1980s there was a need for a similar but more powerful engine for the next generation of the cruise missiles and drones. Microturbo addressed this by developing the "Quadri-axial" class of TRI 60 engines. They increased the air flow through the engine and added a fourth compressor stage (hence the name).

There are two variants in the "Quadri-axial" class, the "-20" and the "-30". The "-30" is aimed at cruise missile applications, and the "-20" is aimed at drone/UAV applications. The only major difference between the two is that the "-20" is slightly derated in thrust to increase engine life.

== Variants ==
There are many variants of this engine and it is used in many missiles and UAVs, as listed below. Aside from the known uses listed below, it is widely speculated that Iran illegally purchased many TRI 60 engines from Microturbo to assemble C-802 cruise missiles purchased from China. It is unclear which variant was purchased. Iran also reverse-engineered this engine as the Toloue-4 turbojet engine. Toloue-4 is used in several Iranian military equipment including Iran's copy of C-802, the Noor missile.

=== TRI 60-1 ===
This variant produces 3.5 kN (790 lbf) of thrust, and is predicted to power the Meteor Mirach 300 and Meteor Mirach 600 remotely piloted vehicles.

- TRI 60-1 067: This variant (same performance as the plain "60-1" model) powers the P3T Sea Eagle anti-ship missile.

=== TRI 60-2 ===
This variant is an uprated model of the 60-1 engines, with thrust increased to 3.7 kN (830 lbf).

- TRI 60-2 071: This model powers the Aérospatiale C.22 target drone, and is slight uprated to 4.0 kN (900 lbf).
- TRI 60-2 074: This model powers several versions of the MQM-107 Streaker drone.
- TRI 60-2 077: This model powers the RBS-15 anti-ship missile.
- TRI 60-2 080: This model powered early Lakshya PTA drones.
- TRI 60-2 088: This model powered the flight test vehicles of the Northrop NV-144 next-generation drone.
- TRI 60-2 089: This model powers the RBS-15 anti-ship missile.
- TRI 60-2 206: This model powers the Aerospatiale C.22 target drone, and is slight uprated to 4.0 kN (900 lbf).
- TRI 60-2 227: This model powers the RBS-15 anti-ship missile.

=== TRI 60-3 ===
This variant produced 4.0 kN (900 lbf) of thrust, and was chosen to power the now-canceled Beech BQM-126 target drone. This variant of the engine was designated J403-MT-400 by the United States Navy.

=== TRI 60-5 ===
This variant produces 4.4 kN (990 lbf) of thrust at a compression ratio of 4.1:1. It powers the Mk. III variant of the RBS-15 anti-ship missile as well as the Alenia Sky-X unmanned aircraft. This engine also powered (or was an option to power) the "D" and "E" variants of the MQM-107 target drone. The "5+" variant powers the BQM-167 Skeeter target drone. The 5+ model also demonstrated the engine's supersonic flight capability in 2007. As of 2008, this is the last three-compressor-stage variant of the TRI 60 in production.

=== TRI 60-20 ===
This variant features a 4-stage compressor (like the 60-30 variant below). It is aimed at target drone aircraft, and is essentially identical to the 60-30 except for being de-rated to 5.4 kN (1,200 lbf) to extend the engine's life. As of 2008, it only existed as a prototype and was tested on a MQM-107 drone.

=== TRI 60-30 ===
Like the TRI 60-20, the -30 variant features a 4-stage compressor that increased the compression ratio to 6.3:1 and increases rated thrust to 5.7 kN (1,300 lbf). This engine is used in the MBDA Apache and Storm Shadow / SCALP EG cruise missiles.

== Specifications (TRI-60-30) ==
Data from

==== General characteristics ====
- Type: single spool turbojet
- Length: 841 mm (33.1 in)
- Diameter: 343 mm (13.5 in)
- Dry weight: 61.2 kg (135 lb)

==== Components ====
- Compressor: 4 stage axial
- Combustors: annular
- Turbine: single stage

==== Performance ====
- Maximum thrust: 5.7 kN (1,300 lbf)
- Overall pressure ratio: 6.3:1
- Air mass flow: 8.14 kg/s (17.9 lb/s)
- Specific fuel consumption: 29 g/(kN⋅s) or 1.0 lb/(lbf⋅h)
- Thrust-to-weight ratio: 9.53

== See also ==
Related development

- Microturbo TRI-40

Comparable engines

- Teledyne CAE F106
- Williams F107

Related lists

- List of aircraft engines
