= Composite Engineering BQM-167 Skeeter =

US Air Force aerial target drone

BQM-167 Skeeter
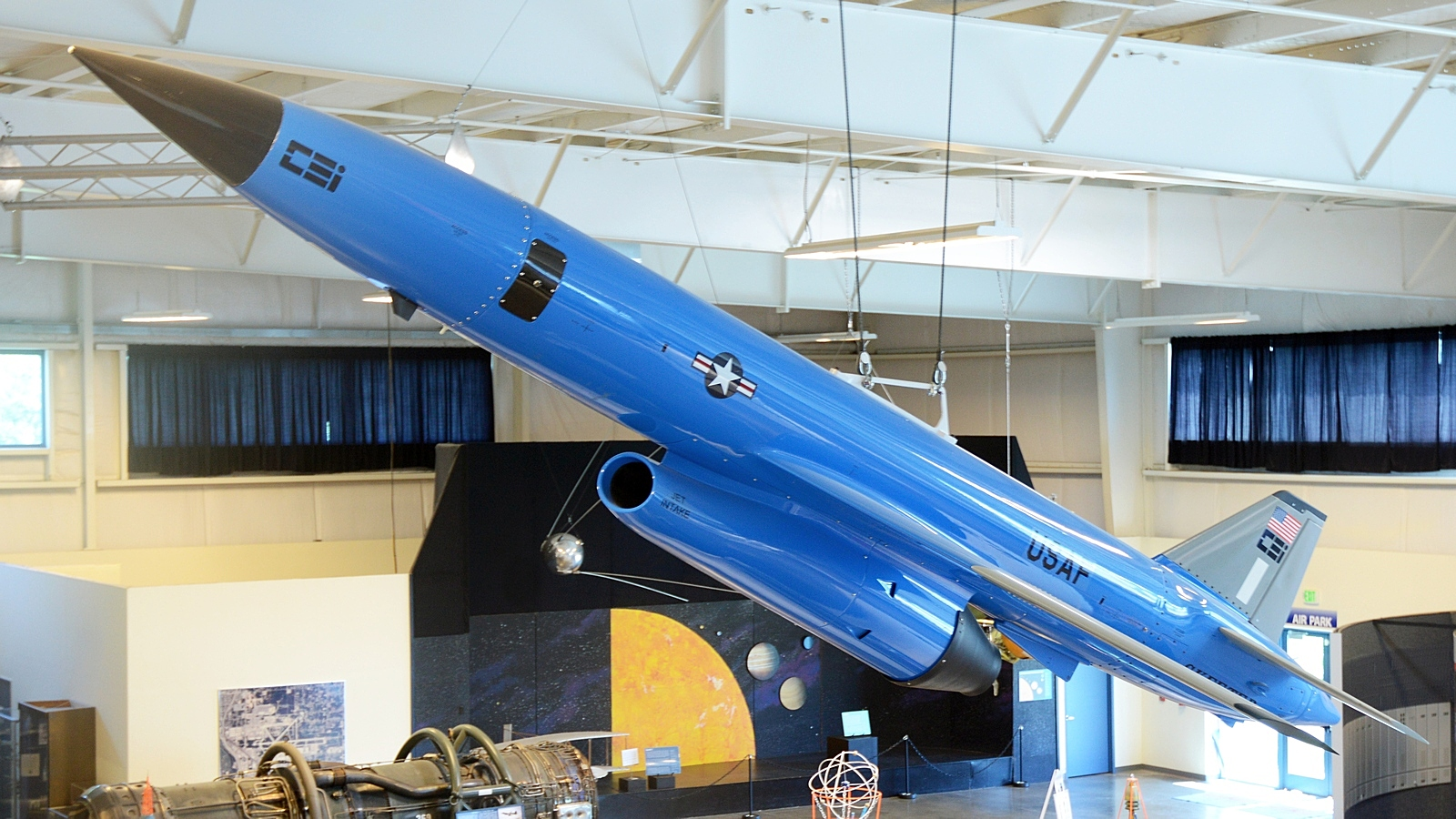
- BQM-167 Skeeter target drone

General information
- Type: Unmanned target drone
- National origin: United States
- Manufacturer: Composite Engineering Inc. Kratos Defense & Security Solutions
- Status: In service
- Primary user: United States Air Force
- Number built: 37

History
- Developed into: Kratos BQM-177

The Composite Engineering BQM-167 Skeeter is a subscale aerial target (drone) developed and manufactured by Composite Engineering Inc. (acquired by Kratos Defense & Security Solutions) and operated by the United States Air Force and certain international customer air forces (designation BQM-167i). It replaced the Beechcraft MQM-107 Streaker.

== Design and development ==
The BQM-167 was developed and manufactured by Composite Engineering Inc. (now part of Kratos Defense & Security Solutions), and is constructed of carbon fiber and epoxy-based materials.

Two prototype targets were built and test flown in 2001. The BQM-167A was selected as the next-generation Air Force subscale aerial target in July 2002. A total of six targets were built for use during the flight performance demonstration (FPD) phase with its first flight 8 December 2004. A total of 13 FPD launches were made into March 2006.

First acceptance testing was completed in August 2006, then pre-operational testing consisted of 13 test flights using production targets from August 2006 - June 2007. The first BQM-167 air-to-air missile live-fire mission took place 7 February 2007. Initial Operational Capability was achieved in 2008. Each target cost US$570,000.

== Operational history ==
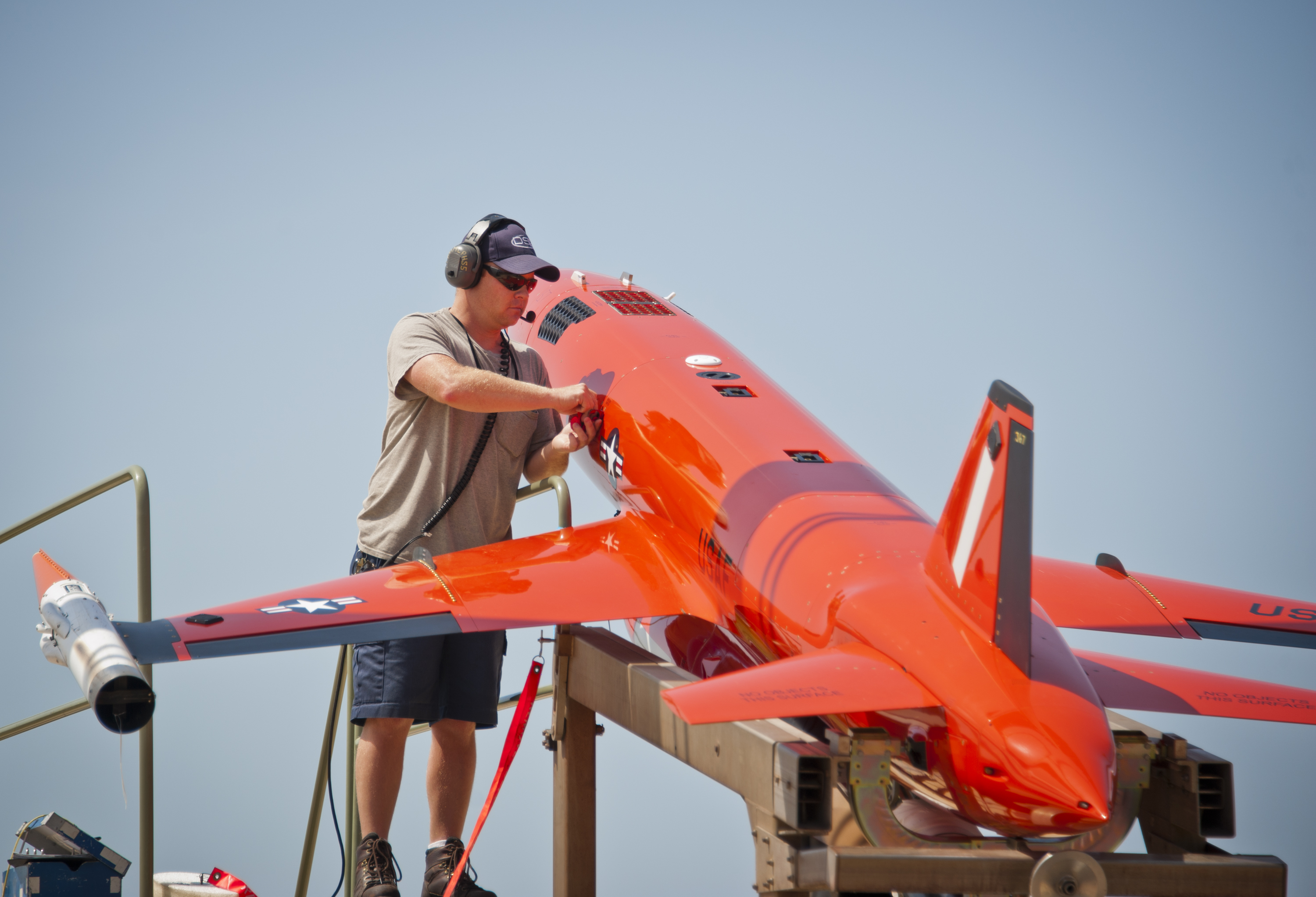
BQM-167 being prepared for launch

The 82nd Aerial Targets Squadron operates and maintains the target at Tyndall Air Force Base, Florida.

The drone is land-launched using a rocket-assisted takeoff and launched from a rail system, and recovered on land or sea using a parachute system. After assessment and refurbishment, the drone is placed back into service.

The USAF has had 37 in inventory.

On 19 March 2021, a BQM-167 washed ashore in Boynton Beach, Florida after a weapon systems evaluation.

== Variants ==
=== UTAP-22 Mako ===
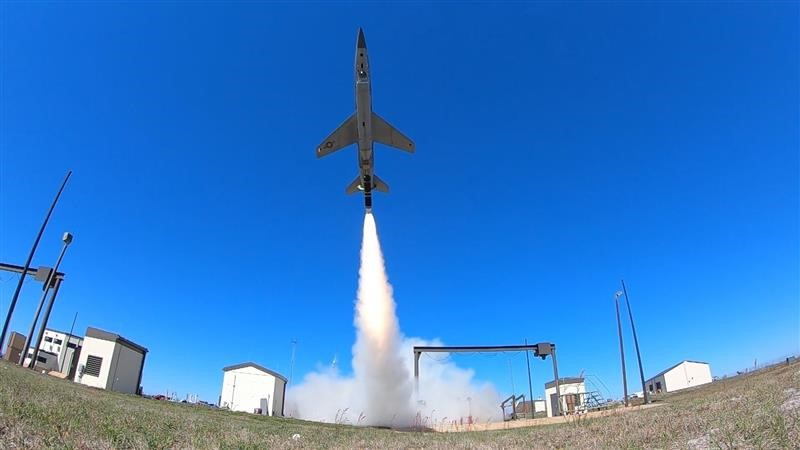
Launch of a UTAP-22 tactical unmanned vehicle in April 2021

On 23 November 2015, Kratos completed the second flight of its self-funded Unmanned Tactical Aerial Platform (UTAP-22), a development of the BQM-167A converted into a low-cost unmanned combat aerial vehicle (UCAV). The test involved collaborative airborne operations with a manned AV-8B Harrier fighter for 94 minutes demonstrating command and control through a tactical data-link, autonomous formation flying with the AV-8B, and transfer of UTAP-22 control between operators in a tactical network and then to an independent control link. The 6.1 m (21 ft)-long turbojet-powered aircraft can travel at Mach 0.91 (693 mph; 1,115 km/h) up to an altitude of 50,000 ft (15,000 m) with a maximum range of 1,400 nmi (1,600 mi; 2,600 km) and an endurance of three hours. It can carry a 159 kg (351 lb) internal payload, a 227 kg (500 lb) external payload, and has a 45 kg (99 lb)-capable weapon hardpoint on each wing. The platform is recoverable on land or at sea using a parachute system. In May 2017, the UTAP-22 received the official name Mako. The aircraft costs between $2-$3 million.

== Operators ==
United States

- United States Air Force

Singapore

- Republic of Singapore Air Force

Sweden

- Swedish Defence Materiel Administration

== Specifications ==
Data from
• US Air Force - Fact Sheet, BQM-167A
• Kratos Unmanned Systems - Quick Facs, BQM-167A

General characteristics

- Crew: None
- Length: 20 ft 0 in (6.1 m)
- Wingspan: 10 ft 6 in (3.2 m)
- Height: 4 ft 0 in (1.2 m)
- Empty weight: 690 lb (313 kg)
- Max takeoff weight: 2,050 lb (930 kg)
- Powerplant: 1 × 1x MicroTurbo Tri 60-5+ turbojet, 990 lbf (4.4 kN) thrust

Performance

- Maximum speed: 600 kn (690 mph, 1,100 km/h) (sea level)
- Cruise speed: 230 kn (260 mph, 430 km/h) (sea level)
- Service ceiling: 50,000 ft (15,000 m) MSL 50 ft AGL min. / 8 m min.
  9 G turns; recovered by a parachute recovery system either from land or water

Avionics
IR and RF Tow Targets; IR and RF Wing Pods; Chaff / Flare Dispensing; Vector & Scalar Scoring
