= BQMS =

BQMS may refer to:

- Battalion Quartermaster Sergeant, a rank in the Irish Defence Forces, also used in the United States during World War I
- Battery Quartermaster Sergeant, a staff sergeant appointment in the Royal Artillery (UK), Royal Canadian Artillery and Irish Army; also used in the United States from 1861 through World War I
