= Kratos Defense & Security Solutions =

U.S. military contractor

Kratos Defense & Security Solutions, Inc.
- Formerly: Wireless Facilities Incorporated (1994–2007)
- Type: Public
- Traded as: Nasdaq: KTOS; S&P 400 component
- Industry: Arms industry; Cybersecurity
- Founded: 1994; 32 years ago
- Founders: Massih Tayebi; Masood Tayebi
- Headquarters: San Diego, California, U.S.
- Products: Directed-energy weapons, electronics, unmanned aerial vehicles
- Revenue: ▲US$1.2 billion (2024)
- Operating income: ▲US$250 million (2024)
- Net income: ▲US$225 million (2024)
- Total assets: ▲US$1.55 billion (2024)
- Total equity: ▲US$4 billion (2024)
- Number of employees: 3,600 (December 2024)
- Website: kratosdefense.com

Kratos Defense & Security Solutions, Inc. is an American technology company with manufacturing concentrations in weapons and military electronics. It is headquartered in San Diego, California, United States. Customers include the U.S. federal government, foreign governments, commercial enterprises and state and local government agencies. The company is divided into 6 divisions.

Some of Kratos' most recent products are part of a Pentagon effort to invest in businesses in Silicon Valley.

== History ==
Kratos Defense & Security Solutions was founded as Wireless Facilities Incorporated (WFI), a company whose primary market was the building and support of the telecommunications infrastructure and networks. In 2004, the company primarily sold its services to the US Government, mostly the U.S. Department of Defense.

From 2004 to 2009, the company acquired several companies in the federal services business. Acquisitions included several small public safety firms and mid-sized professional services firms such as:

- High Technology Solutions (HTS), communications systems engineering and operational network outsourcing.
- Madison Research (MRD): engineering and information technology services.
- Haverstick Consulting (Haverstick): engineering and program management, and government outsourcing
- SYS Technologies (SYS): information technology products (dopplerVUE and NeuralStar), services and wireless communication systems for the United States Department of Defense, Department of Homeland Security and various industrial customers.
- Digital Fusion, Inc (DFI)

In September 2007, the company's name was changed to Kratos Defense & Security Solutions.

=== Merger with Integral Systems ===
On July 27, 2011, Integral Systems merged with Kratos. Integral Systems provided services regarding the handling of data from space and terrestrial-based platforms into networks for military, government, and commercial satellite and aerospace customers.

Integral Systems employed about 800 people in 14 locations, and had 6 subsidiaries:

- Integral Systems, Inc.: central holding company.
- Integral Systems Europe: European branch.
- Lumistar: telemetry products for PCI, VME, cPCI, and ISA computer buses.
- Newpoint Technologies: communications infrastructure management.
- RT Logic: signal processing systems for the space and aerospace communications industry.
- SAT Corporation: SAT Corporation bought CVG, Inc. and changed its name to SATCOM Solutions. Less than a year later, Kratos bought Integral Systems, and changed SATCOM Solutions back to CVG, Inc.
- CVG, Inc.: satellite-based communication services. Its subsidiaries include Avtec Systems, Inc. and Sophia Wireless.

In February 2019, Kratos purchased Florida Turbine Technologies.

=== Technical Directions Inc. (TDI) ===
On February 24, 2020, Kratos bought small turbojet manufacturer, Technical Directions Inc. (TDI), based in Detroit, Michigan. Their smallest TDI-J45 powered the AFRL LOCAAS program of Lockheed Martin, a late 1990s endeavor to build a cheap anti-tank missile, which was since cancelled. It was selected by starting an engine using a leaf blower: TDI achieved ignition at 5% engine speed. TDI engines typically operate at 200–534 kn (370–989 km/h) and at altitudes of 20,000-30,000 ft; they run the fuel through the mechanical bearings to avoid oil lubrication.

Model	TDI-J45	TDI-J5	TDI-J7	TDI-J85
Diameter	4.50 in (114 mm)	5.73 in (146 mm)	7.08 in (180 mm)	8.81 in (224 mm)
Thrust (idle – max)	6-30 lbf (27-133 N)	7-55 lbf (31-245 N)	10-100 lbf (44-445 N)	20-200 lbf (88-890 N)
Airflow	.70 lb/s (0.32 kg/s)	1.00 lb/s (0.45 kg/s)	2.00 lb/s (0.91 kg/s)	2.00 lb/s (0.91 kg/s)
Weight	6.1 lb (3.5 kg)	6.3 lb (3.5 kg)	16 lb (7.2 kg)	28 lb (12.7 kg)
Generator	1.2 kW			

The TDI-J85 powers the US AFRL’s Gray Wolf, a low-cost cruise missile built by Northrop Grumman with a range of at least 250 nm (463 km). In March 2020, the Gray Wolf was tested with high altitude operation and multiple inflight engine starts. The Gray Wolf may be used in a networked swarm, like the AFRL Golden Horde initiative to be demonstrated in late 2020 with a modified Small Diameter Bomb I and a modified Miniature Air-Launched Decoy, coordinated against a simulated target in a fall 2021 demonstration.

Kratos is expected in 2026 to open a new jet engine production line in Bristow, Oklahoma, initially creating 60 jobs.

== Products ==
- AN/SEQ-3 Laser Weapon System
- Kratos XQ-58 Valkyrie
- Composite Engineering BQM-167 Skeeter
- "Demogorgon", or "Off-Board Sensing Station" drone (OBSS program)
- Clone Ranger UCAV
- Ragnarök (926 km range cruise missile)

== See also ==
- Titan Corporation
