= Target drone =

Unmanned aircraft used for target practice

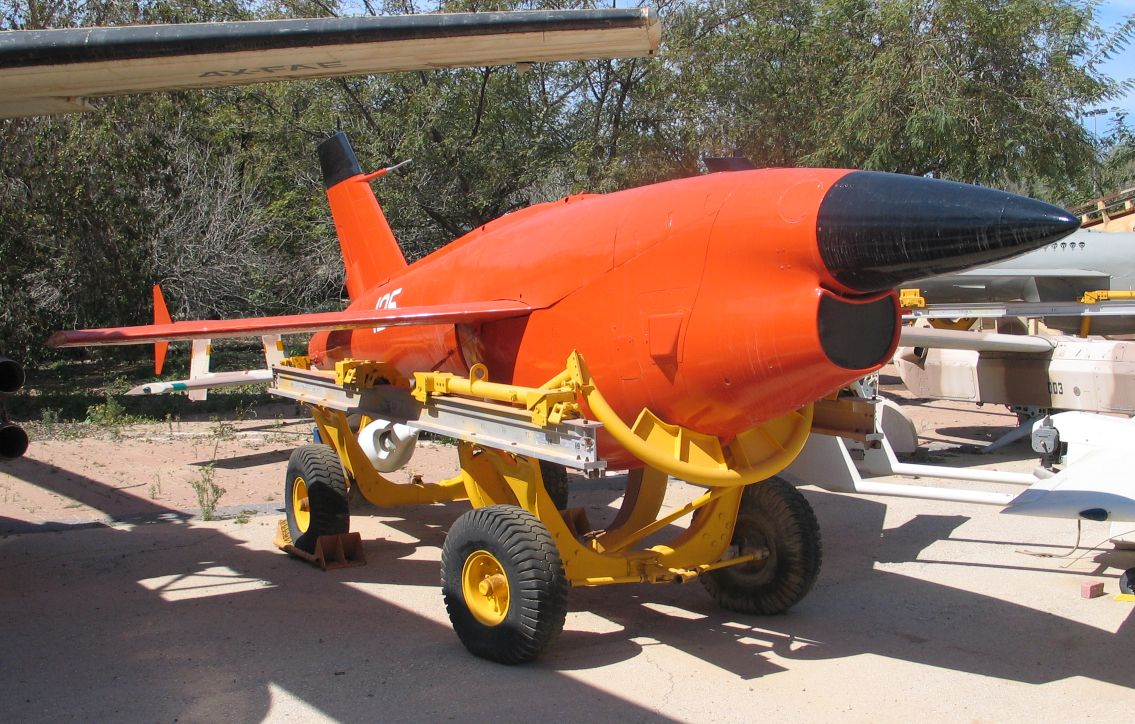
Ryan BQM-34 Firebee jet-propelled drone, used as a target drone

A target drone is an unmanned aerial vehicle, generally remote controlled, usually used in the training of anti-aircraft crews.

One of the earliest drones was the British DH.82 Queen Bee, a variant of the Tiger Moth trainer aircraft operational from 1935. Its name led to the present term "drone".

In their simplest form, target drones often resemble radio-controlled model aircraft. More modern drones may use countermeasures, radar, and similar systems to mimic manned aircraft.

More advanced drones are made from large, older missiles which have had their warheads removed.

In the United Kingdom, obsolete Royal Air Force and Royal Navy jet and propeller-powered aircraft (such as the Fairey Firefly, Gloster Meteor and de Havilland Sea Vixen used at RAE Llanbedr between the 1950s and 1990s) have also been modified into remote-controlled drones, but such modifications are costly. With a much larger budget, the U.S. military has been more likely to convert retired aircraft or older versions of still serving aircraft (e.g., QF-4 Phantom II and QF-16 Fighting Falcon) into remotely piloted targets for US Air Force, US Navy and US Marine Corps use as Full-Scale Aerial Targets.

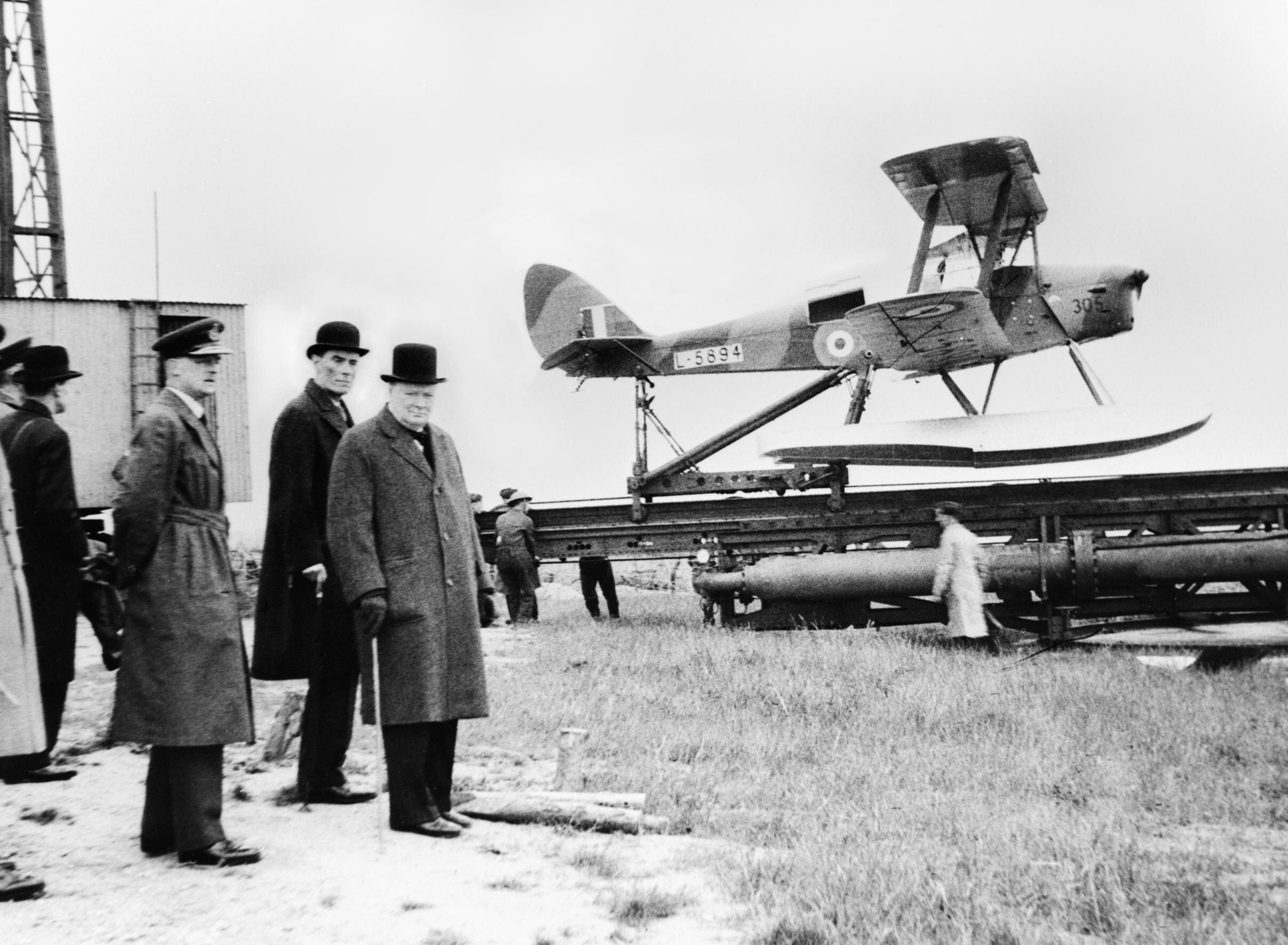
Winston Churchill and the Secretary of State for War waiting to see the launch of a de Havilland Queen Bee radio-controlled target drone, 6 June 1941.

== List of target drones ==
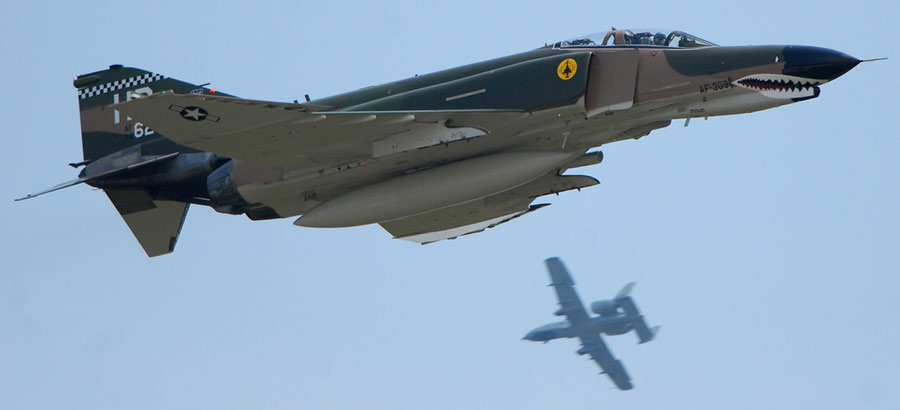
QF-4E from the 82d Aerial Targets Squadron detachment at Holloman AFB, flying manned at a McGuire AFB air show in May 2007 with an A-10A in the background

=== Purpose built ===
- Aerial Target
- Airspeed Queen Wasp
- AQM-127 SLAT
- Aviolanda AT-21
- de Havilland Queen Bee
- DRDO Abhyas
- DRDO Fluffy
- DRDO Lakshya
- DRDO Ulka
- Denel Dynamics Skua
- Meggitt Banshee
- Aisheng Drone-2
- GAF Jindivik
- GAF Turana
- HESA Karrar
- Mirach 100/5
- MQM-170
- TAI Şimşek
- TAI Turna
- Lockheed AQM-60 Kingfisher
- QinetiQ Banshee
- BQM-34 Firebee
- BQM-74 Chukar
- BQM-167 Skeeter
- Kratos BQM-177
- Kratos MQM-178 Firejet
- NAI CK-1
- Nord CT41
- Karrar (UCAV)
- NCSIST Spark

=== Conversions ===
- Curtiss Queen Seamew
- Douglas BT-2BR and BT-2BG
- de Havilland Vampire
- Fairey Queen
- Firefly U.Mk 8 and U.Mk 9
- Meteor U.15, 16, and 21
- MiG-15V
- Mil Mi-4UM
- Miles Queen Martinet
- F4U-4K Corsair
- F6F-5K Hellcat
- Ilyushin Il-28M
- PQ-8 Cadet
- PQ-13 Ercoupe
- PQ-14 Cadet
- QAH-1S Cobra
- QP-4B Privateer
- QB-17 Flying Fortress
- QT-33 Shooting Star
- QB-47 Stratojet
- QF-80 Shooting Star
- QF-86 Sabre
- QF-100 Super Sabre
- QF-102 and PQM-102 Delta Dagger
- QF-104 and UF-104J Starfighter
- QF-106 Delta Dart
- QF-4 Phantom II
- QF-16 Fighting Falcon
- QF-9 Cougar
