= HESA Ababil =

Iranian unmanned aerial vehicle

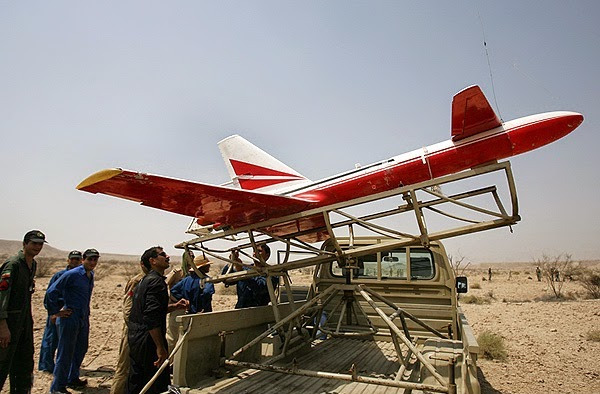
- An Iranian Ababil-B on a JATO launcher.

General information
- Type: Ababil-1: Loitering munition: Ababil-2; Ababil-B: Target drone; Ababil-S: Surveillance and reconnaissance; Qasef-1: Loitering munition; Ababil-3, Ababil-4 and Ababil-5: Surveillance and reconnaissance; Armed variant: Combat drone
- National origin: Iran
- Manufacturer: HESA Isfahan factory Syrian Scientific Studies and Research Center (Ababil-3)
- Designer: Iran Aircraft Manufacturing Industrial Company
- Status: In service
- Primary user: Iran; Houthi; Syria (Historical)
- Number built: Unknown (Hundreds)

History
- Manufactured: 1980s–present
- Introduction date: disputed
- First flight: 1986

The HESA Ababil (Persian: ابابیل) is an Iranian family of single-engine multirole tactical unmanned aerial vehicles manufactured by Iran Aircraft Manufacturing Industrial Company (HESA). The Ababil comes in four main lines, the Ababil-2, 3, 4 and 5, of which the Ababil-2 has a number of variants. It is considered a long-range, cost effective, low-technology drone.

The Ababil program was begun during the Iran–Iraq War. The Ababil-2, developed in the 1990s, has rudimentary surveillance capabilities and can be used as a loitering munition, but is mainly used as a target drone. The larger and more capable Ababil-3, introduced in the 2000s, was designed for Intelligence, surveillance and reconnaissance use and has improved surveillance capabilities. There is little information about Ababil-4 but it was seen in the 2022 Army Day for the first time. Ababil-5 is the most recent member of this family. It has a greater range and carries more ammunition. Overall, the Ababil has been described "a pretty rough-and-ready system" because of its cheapness, simplicity, and ease of use.

The Ababil-2 and Ababil-3 have been widely exported to governments and paramilitaries in the Middle East and elsewhere. The Ababil has been used in the 2006 Lebanon War, the Iraq War, and the Sudanese, Syrian, Iraqi, and Yemeni civil wars. Meanwhile, Ababil-4 and Ababil-5 (both unveiled in 2022) are only seen in Iranian service.

== Development ==
The early history of the Ababil is unclear. Jane's reports that the Ababil program was begun at Qods Aviation Industries in 1986 and the first delivery was in 1993. Iranian military expert Galen Wright writes that the program began at Iran Electronics Industries in the mid-1980s and began mass production in 1986, with possible use in the Iran–Iraq War.

== Variants ==
The Ababil is built in a number of poorly documented variants. (Note: A number of sources report a spurious "Ababil-5" designation based on a misreading of the name Ababil-S.)

=== Ababil-1 ===
The Ababil-1 was an obscure loitering munition built in the 1980s. Its specifications are not known, there are no known photographs, and it is unknown if it was ever used in combat. It is believed to be out of service.

One source writes that the Ababil-1 was essentially a prototype or preproduction version of the Ababil-2. It is described as a suicide drone with 40 kg of explosives.

=== Ababil-2 ===
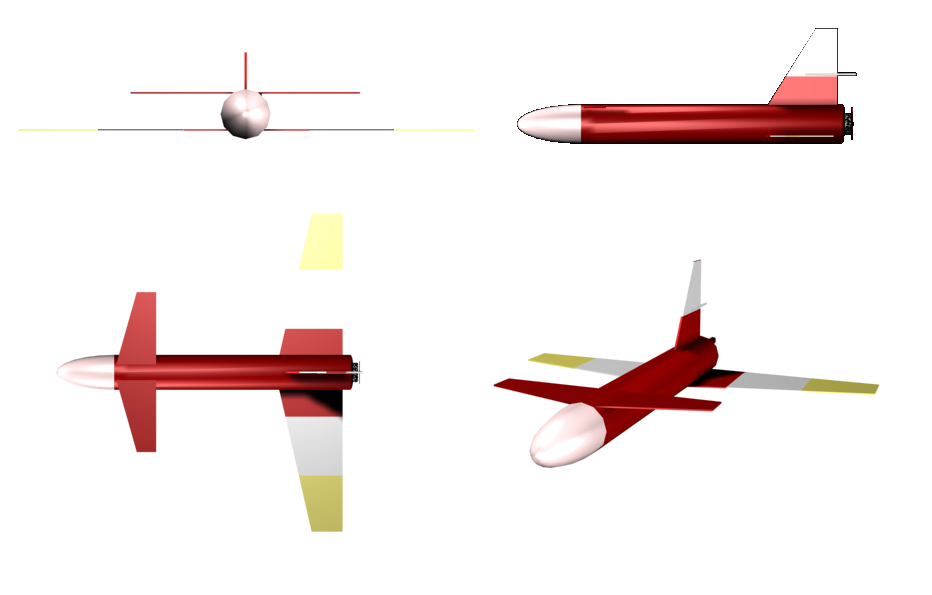
Artist's impression of Ababil-2

The Ababil-2 has an improved flight-control system. Jane's reports that the Ababil-2 had its first flight in 1997 while Galen Wright writes that it entered production in 1992. Both sources agree the Ababil-2 was publicly revealed in 1999. Some sources also designate the Ababil-2 as the Ababil-II.

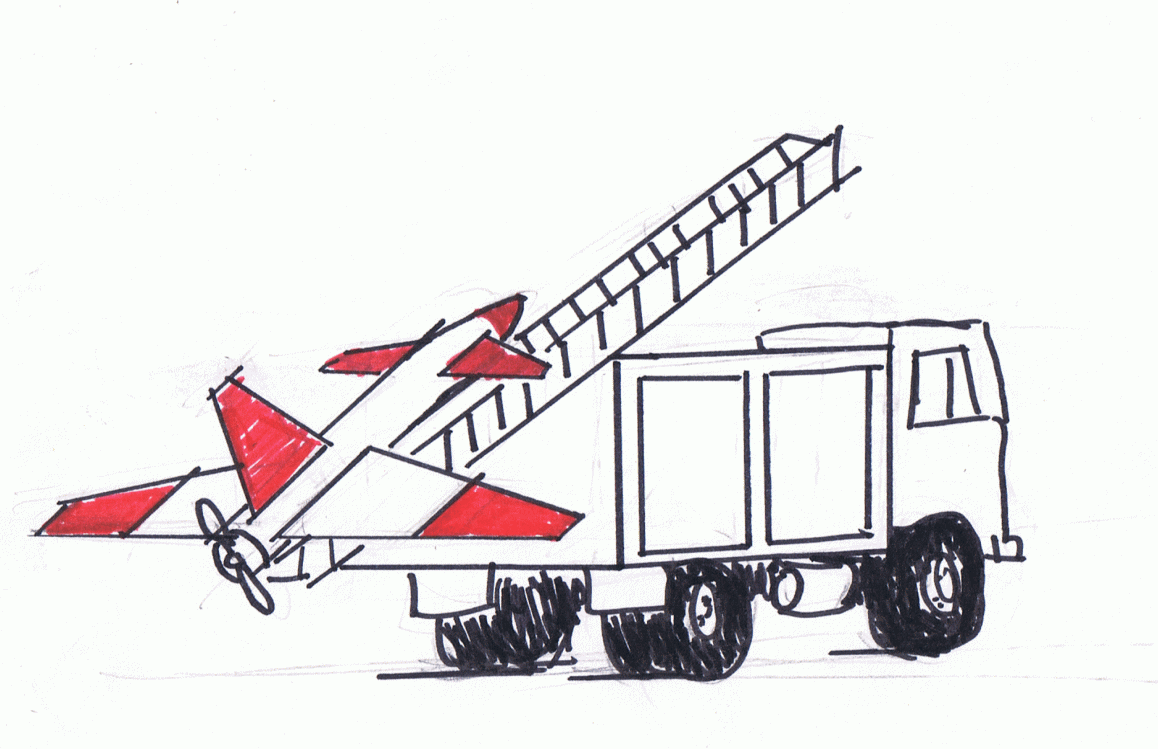
Artist's impression of an Ababil-R being launched from a pneumatic truck launcher.

The Ababil-2 has a cylindrical fuselage, a sweptback vertical fin, and a pusher engine. It is powered by a simple two-bladed pusher propeller with a rear-mounted wing and a front canard for good stall, stability and maneuverability characteristics. All variants have a range of over 100 km and all variants have all-metal construction, except for the Ababil-T, which is composite (fiberglass).

The Ababil-2 can be launched from a zero-length JATO platform or a Mercedes Benz 911 pneumatic truck launcher. The rocket launch system can be used from a ship deck and can be assembled or broken down for portability. For recovery, a parachute provides a descent rate of 4 m/s, or skids can be used for conventional landings on a runway or field. Some airframes have also been seen with landing gear.

==== Target drone ====
The most common Ababil-2 variant is a target drone variant used for training air-defense crews. The name of Ababil variants is unclear, but Jane's reports that this variant is called the Ababil-B. The Ababil-B's mission payloads are acoustic miss-distance-indicators, Infrared devices, and radar reflectors. This variant is the oldest Ababil-2 variant and it apparently entered service in 2001.

==== Surveillance ====
The name of the Ababil-2 surveillance variant is similarly unclear, but Jane's reports that this is called the Ababil-S. Some sources may also designate this the Ababil-R. Galen Wright assesses it as having "only rudimentary" surveillance capabilities in contrast to other intelligence, surveillance and reconnaissance UAVs.

==== Twin-tail variant ====
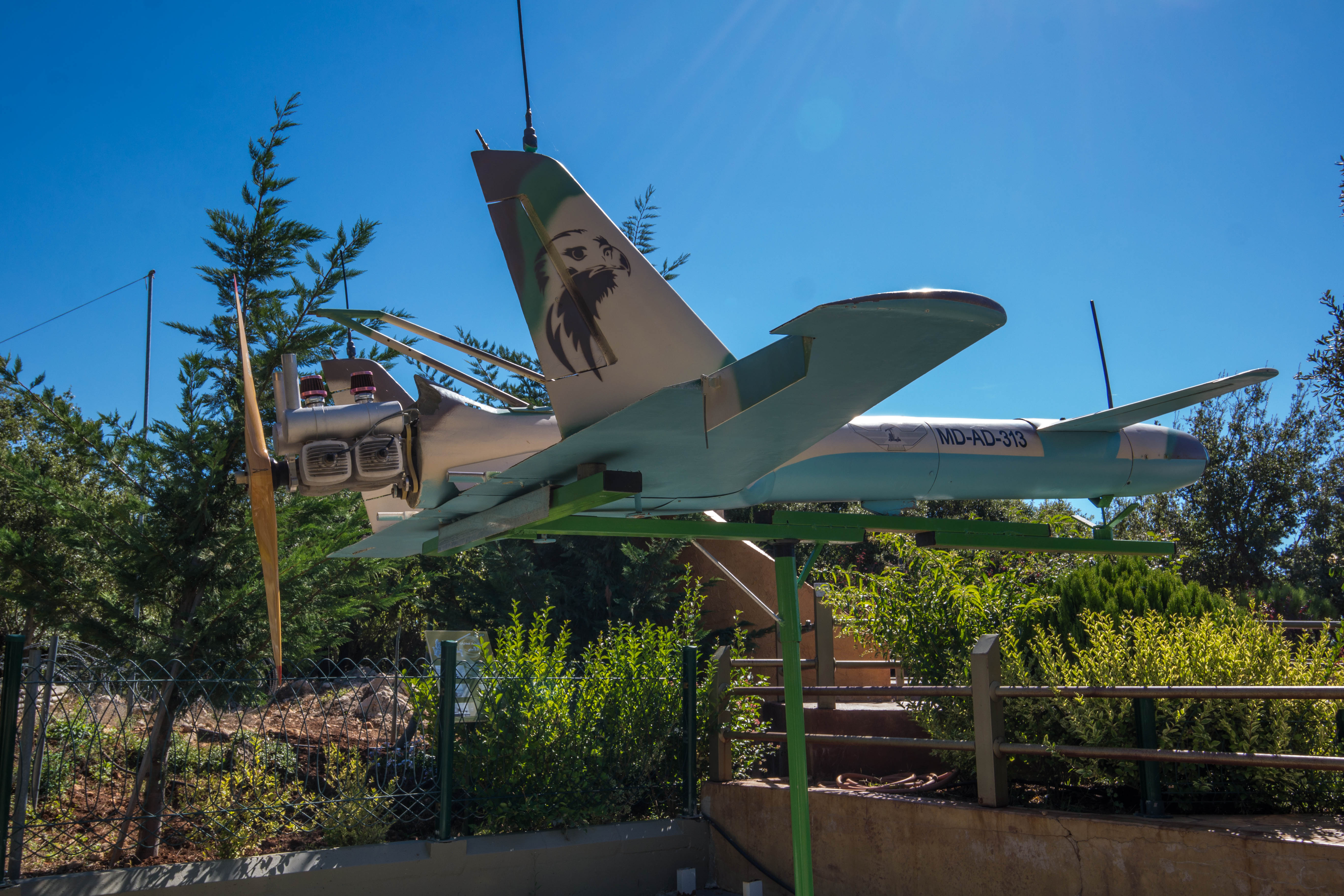
A Hezbollah Ababil-2 UAV, twin-tail variant with surveillance payload, on display at Mleeta, Lebanon. This specific drone is described as a Mirsad-1.

The Ababil-2 also exists in a twin-tail short/medium-range attack variant, which some (but not all) sources name the Ababil-T. This variant can be fitted with surveillance, target drone, or disposable strike munition payloads. It is probably coterminous with the Mirsad-1 UAV operated by Hezbollah and may have been renamed Qasef-1 in Houthi service.

==== Ababil-CH ====
The Ababil-CH has two rear tails, like the Ababil-T, but is used as a target drone like the Ababil-B. It is slightly larger than the Ababil-T.

==== Qasef-1 ====
The Qasef-1 and Qasef-2K loitering munition versions are based on the Ababil-2 airframe and has a 30-kg warhead. It has been solely operated by Yemeni Houthis, who have mostly used it to attack the radar components of MIM-104 Patriot surface-to-air missiles. The Qasef-1 has been in use since late 2016 and some examples have been intercepted in transit to Yemen. It is possibly a renamed or modified Ababil-T with an installed explosive charge or a warhead.

The Houthis claim that they manufacture Qasef-1s themselves, but this claim has been disputed and there is widespread suspicion that it is Iranian-built.

=== Ababil-3 ===
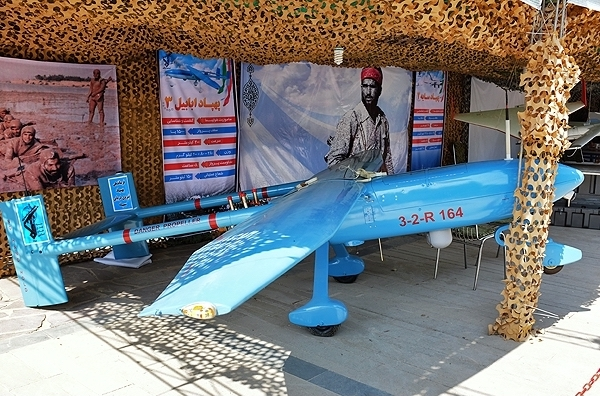
An Iranian Ababil-3. Note that with a mid-body wing, twin tailbooms, and horizontal tail, the Ababil-3 is very different from other Ababils.

The Ababil-3 is a complete redesign of the Ababil with an improved airframe used solely for surveillance: it carries better equipment and can stay aloft for longer. Some sources also designate the Ababil-3 as the Ababil-III. The Ababil-3 is thought to be based on the South African Denel Dynamics Seeker, and possibly the Seeker-2D model in particular. It is more widely exported than the Ababil-2, and is known to have entered production by 2008, with specific parts manufactured by 2006. It was officially unveiled in 2010.

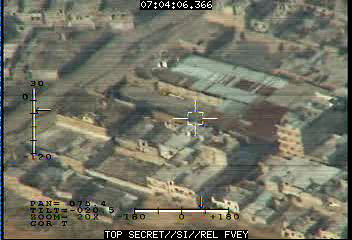
The Ababil-3 can collect real-time video.

The Ababil-3 has a cylindrical body, with wings mounted on top while at the end of the body is an H-shaped twin boom. The wing design is a rectangle which after half its lengths tapers toward the wing tips. The Ababil-3's wingspan is about 7 meters, compared to 3 meters for the Ababil-2. It uses an engine from German company Limbach Flugmotoren. Other sources suggest the Ababil-3 is powered by Chinese or Iranian clones of the L550. Other particular parts inside the Ababil-3 were sourced from Irish defense contractors.

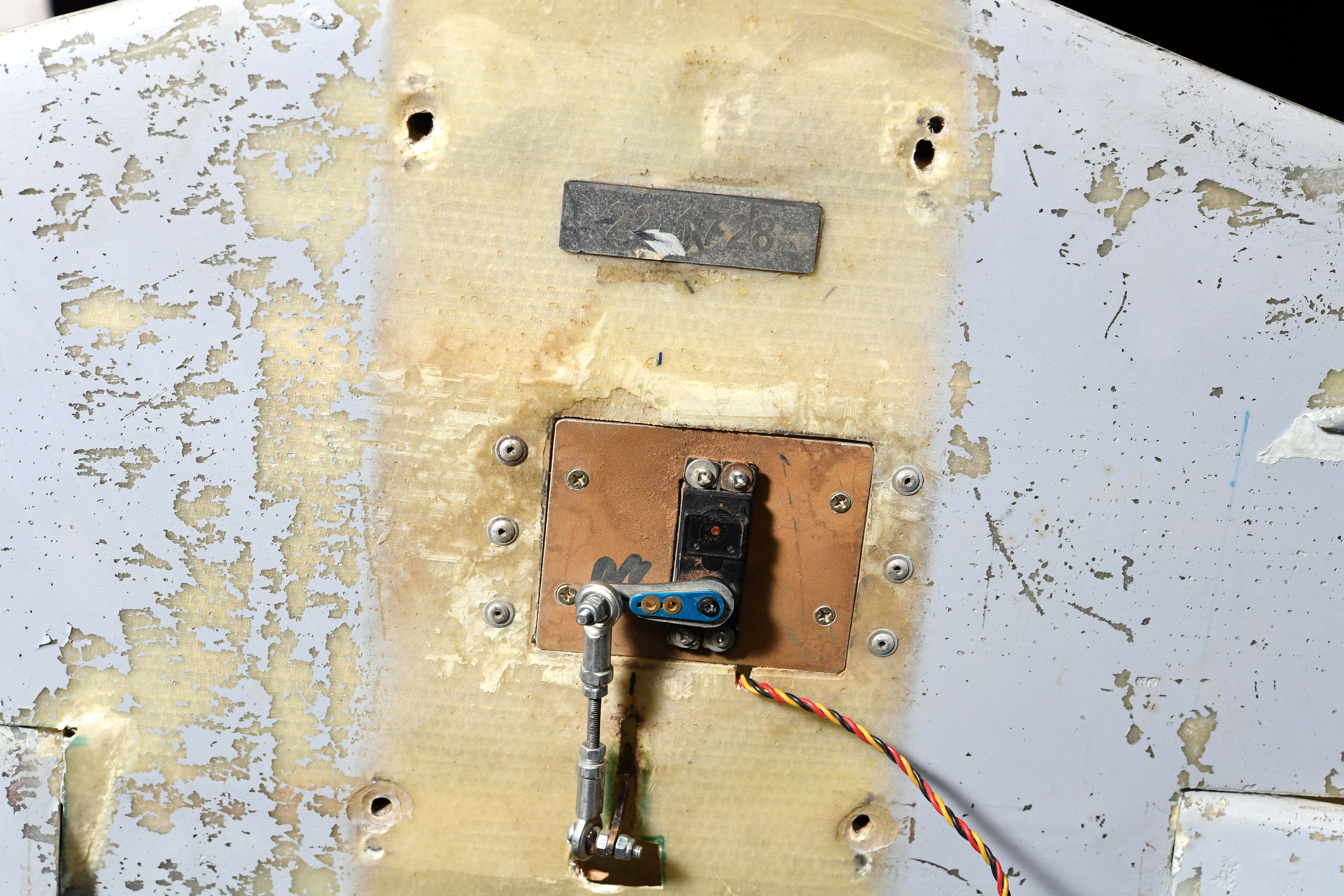
The Ababil-T's fiberglass construction, seen here in a Qasef-1 recovered from Houthis in Yemen, is clearly visible.

Analysis of an Ababil-3 downed over ISIS-held territory in Iraq, apparently due to mechanical failure, finds that the Ababil-3 is built out of composite materials. The powerplant had plain-surfaced cylinder heads; it was unclear if the engine was manufactured in Iran or China. Overall, the manufacture was "very economical" and the Ababil-3 was designed for low cost. There were also a number of defects in the downed Ababil-3 model, which could suggest poor manufacture or handling in the field.

Ababil-3s are based at an airstrip outside of Minab, a town near Bandar Abbas. Ababil-3s are also known to be based at Bandar Abbas International Airport. The Ababil-3 is comparable with the RQ-2.

The Ababil-3's max airspeed is 200 km/h (120 mph), its range is 100 km (62 mi) (roundtrip), and it has a service ceiling of 5,000 m (16,000 ft). It has an endurance of 4 hours. An estimated 217 Ababil-3s have been built as of July 2019.

In 2014 Iran announced that they had developed night vision capabilities for the Ababil-3. Previous Ababil variants were most effective in daytime. As of 2020, Iran has armed versions of the Ababil-3 drone.

Ababil-3s have been extensively used in the Syrian Civil War. Syrian Armed Forces use it for targeting high-precision heavy artillery strikes with Krasnopol, and multiple ISTAR or combat drone roles. Also, they have been produced under license by the Syrian Scientific Studies and Research Center.

An Ababil-3 crashed or was brought down in Pakistani territory in July 2019.

=== Ababil-4 ===
By 2022, Iran was using Ababil-4 in military exercises and military parades but released little information about it. This drone has longer range and duration than Ababil-3 and is used in reconnaissance and surveillance or combat roles.

=== Ababil-5 ===
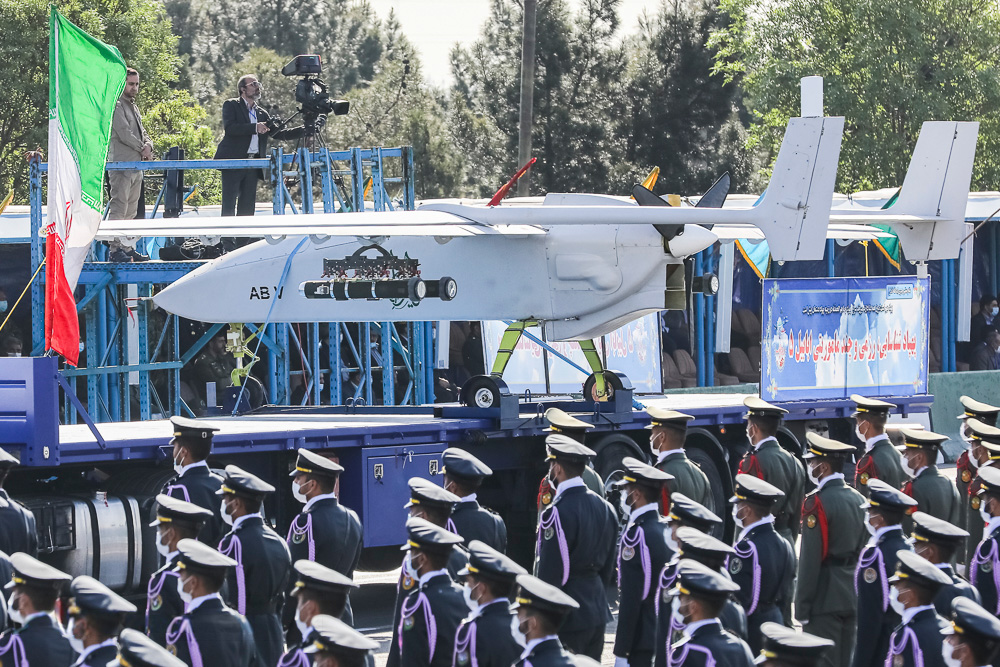
Ababil-5

Ababil-5 was first unveiled on April 18, 2022 during the Iran Army Day. It has a Rotax-915 engine (or a similar model) with 141 horsepower. The Ababil-5 drone boasts a flight duration of 12 hours in combat mode, and up to 24 hours in reconnaissance mode. It can carry four guided anti-tank missiles (Almas series) with a range of 10 kilometers or six Qaem-1 precision-guided bombs (Qaem series) weighing 12.5 kilograms with a range of 40 kilometers or four Qaem-5 weighing 20 kilograms with a range of 40 kilometers. The drone is used in reconnaissance and surveillance or combat roles.

== Operational history ==
=== Lebanon ===
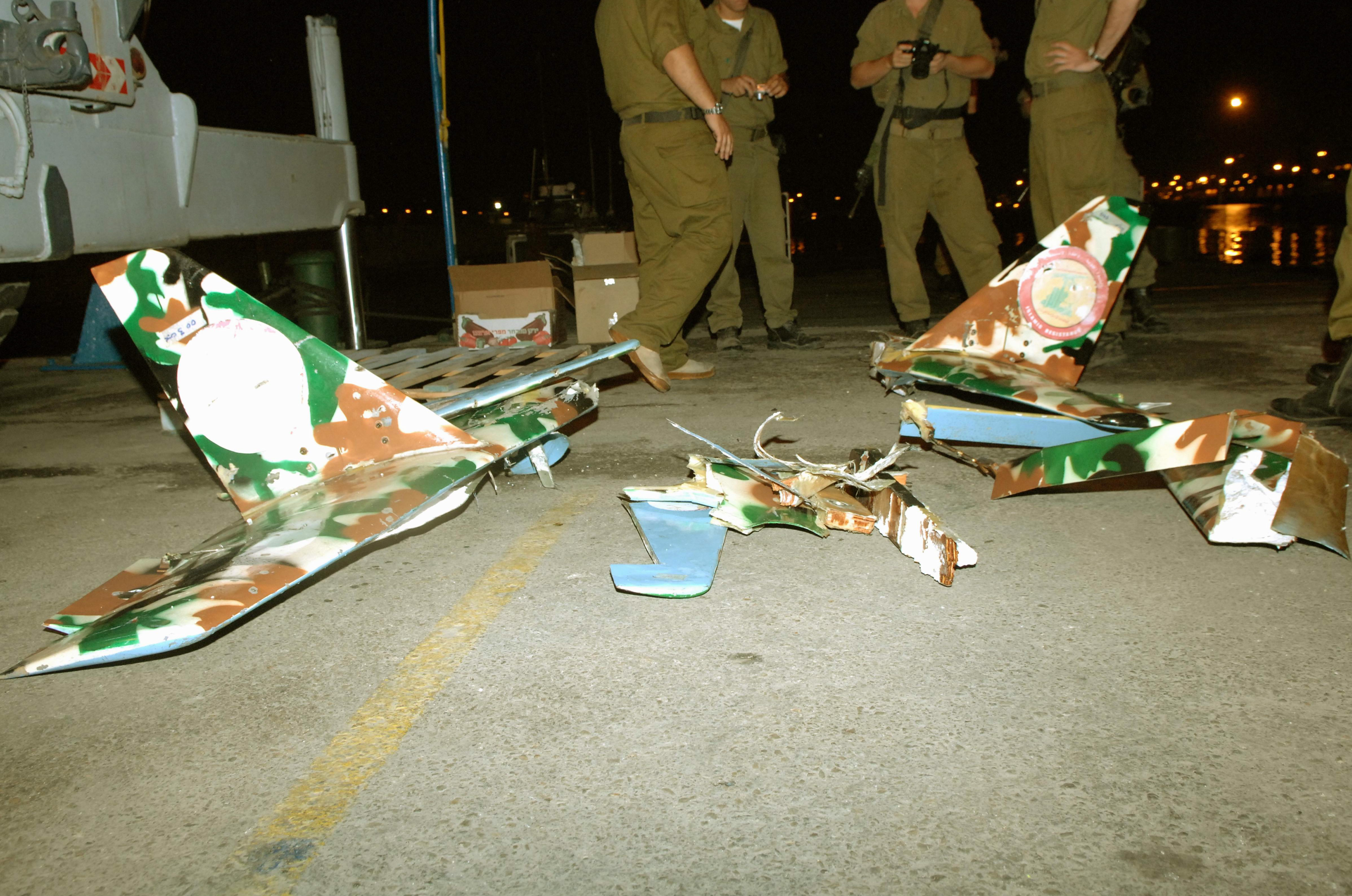
Wreckage of the Hezbollah Ababil-2 launched August 7, 2006.

Hezbollah acquired Ababil-2 drones (twin-tail variant) in 2002, and operated them under the Mirsad-1 designation. Israel has said that Hezbollah received at least 12 Ababils before the 2006 Lebanon War. Three Ababils were launched during the conflict.

The first Ababil was shot down by an Israeli F-16 on 7 August 2006 off the coast of Northern Israel. The second Ababil crashed inside Lebanon on 13 August. The third Ababil deployed by Hezbollah was shot down by another F-16 hours later just inside Israel's northern border. Hezbollah was assessed as having several Ababil UAVs in 2009, although other estimates have ranged from 12 to 24–30. By 2018, Hezbollah stated that the Mirsad-1 had been retired from service.

Hezbollah has also built a large airstrip in Lebanon's Bekaa Valley. There is speculation that the airstrip could support larger, runway-launched Ababil-3 UAVs. Hezbollah is not definitively known to operate the Ababil-3.

=== Sudan ===
The Ababil-3 is in service with Sudan. In 2008, an Ababil-3 crashed or was shot down while on a surveillance mission.

On March 13, 2012, another Sudanese Ababil was lost in action near Toroji, South Kordofan. Sudanese rebels of the SPLA-N said they downed it using ground fire, while the Sudanese government said it was due to mechanical failure.

=== Iraq ===
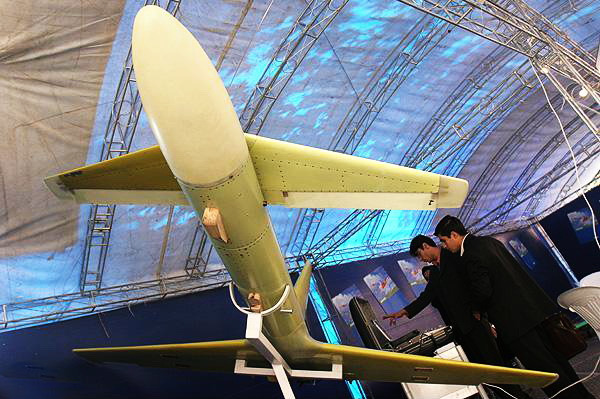
The underside of an Ababil-2.

On 16 March 2009, an American F-16 operating in Iraq shot down an Iranian Ababil 3 drone on 25 February 2009 that had been flying through Iraqi airspace for "almost an hour and 10 minutes." The drone crashed about 60 miles northeast of Baghdad, 12 miles inside Iraqi territory near the town of Balad Ruz in Diyala Governorate. Officials at Iraq's Defence and Interior ministries suggested that the drone might have been scouting for routes to smuggle Iranian weapons into the country. The New York Times, however, speculated that the drone was monitoring Iranian dissidents in Iraq, such as those at Camp Ashraf, which is located near where the drone crashed. Abdul Aziz Mohammed Jassim, head of military operations at the Iraqi defence ministry stated that since the drone, "crossed 10 km into Iraq, it's most likely that its entrance was a mistake."

More recently, Ababil-3 UAVs have been used extensively in the Iraqi Civil War. Their use began in summer 2014, shortly after the Fall of Mosul, from Rasheed Air Base.

=== Iran ===
Iran is the primary operator of Ababil UAVs. Iran operates large numbers of Ababil-2 UAVs, mostly for training air defense crews, and operates Ababil-3 UAVs for surveillance use.

=== Syria ===
Ababil-3 UAVs have been used in the Syrian Civil War since 2012. They have been used by Syrian Army and are some of the most commonly used UAVs in the war. They are especially commonly seen over Damascus.

=== Gaza ===
On 14 December 2014, Hamas militants flew an unmanned air vehicle over a parade in the Gaza Strip marking the 27th anniversary of the organization's establishment. Israeli sources identified the aircraft as an Iranian-made Ababil. Also used in the 2021 conflict.

=== Yemen ===
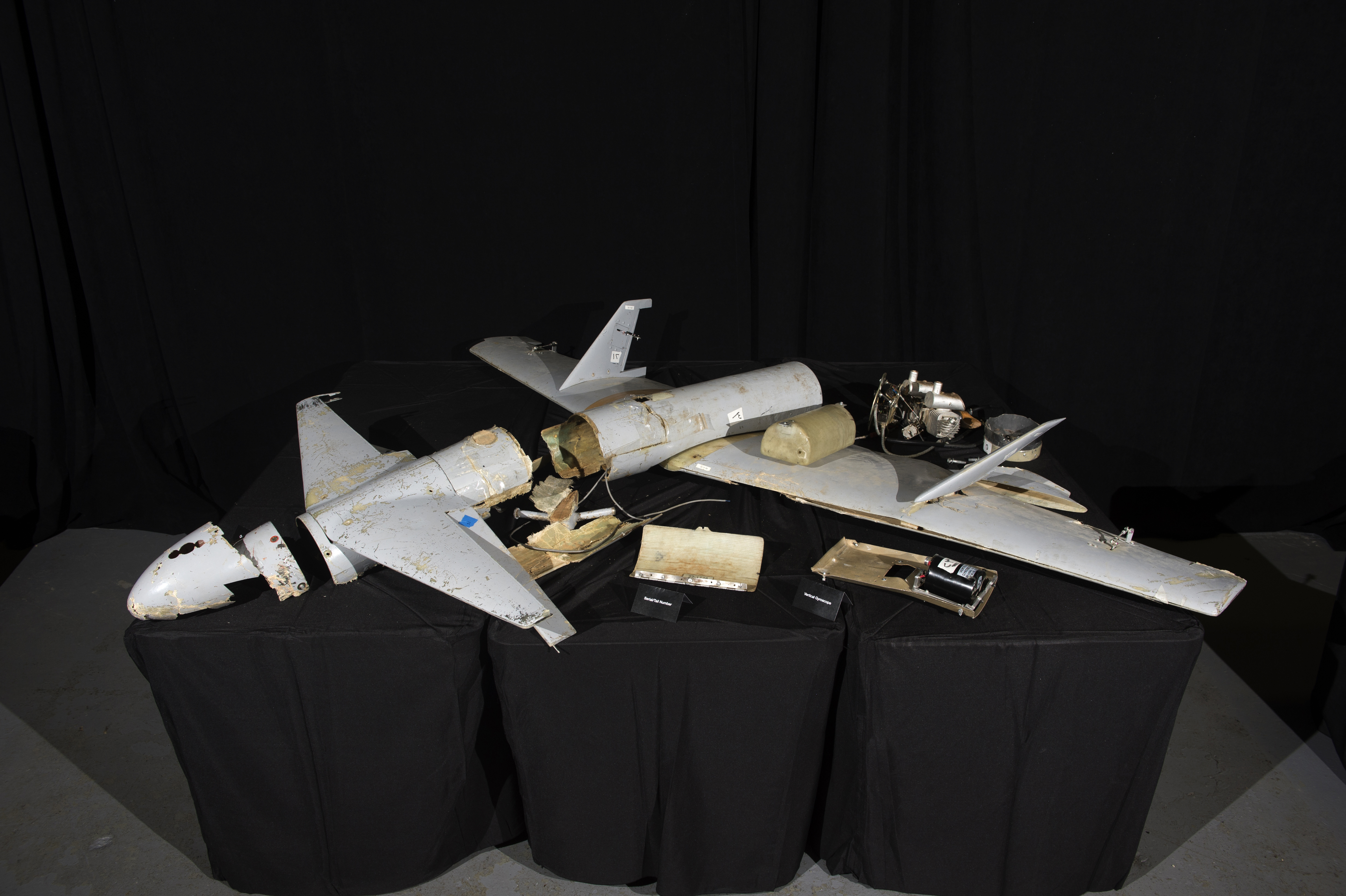
Wreckage of a Qasef-1 from Yemen.

Houthi rebels have operated Ababil-T loitering munitions under the name "Qasef-1" to target Saudi and Emirati radar batteries. According to the Houthis, a new variant of the drone named "Qasef-2K" has been designed to explode from a height of 20 meters in the air and rain shrapnel down on its target and has been used to kill 6 people in the coalition controlled Al Anad Air Base in Yemen. Najran, 840 km southwest of Riyadh on the Saudi-Yemen border also has been receiving Houthi drone attacks.

After the Houthi attack on Saudi oil infrastructure on 14 September 2019, Saudi Arabia tasked F-15 fighter jets armed with missiles to intercept low flying drones, difficult to intercept with ground based high altitude missile systems like the MIM-104 Patriot with several drones being downed since then. On 7 March 2021, during a Houthi attack at several Saudi oil installations, Saudi F-15s shot down several attacking drones shot down using heatseeking AIM-9 Sidewinder missiles, with video evidence showing at least two Samad-3 UAVs and one Qasef-2K downed. On 30 March 2021, a video made by Saudi border guards showed a Saudi F-15 shooting down a Houthi Quasef-2K drone with an AIM-120 AMRAAM fired at short range.

== Operators ==
=== Current ===
- Iran
  - Islamic Revolutionary Guard Corps Aerospace Force: Ababil-3
  - Islamic Revolutionary Guard Corps Navy: Ababil-3, Ababil-4, Ababil-T
  - Islamic Republic of Iran Air Force: Ababil-4, Ababil-5
  - Islamic Republic of Iran Army: Ababil-3, Ababil-4, Ababil-T
- Iraq:
  - Popular Mobilization Forces: Ababil-T
- Sovereignty Council of Sudan: Ababil-3, rebranded as "Zagil III-B"

=== Former ===
- Republic of Sudan (1985–2019)
- Ba'athist Syria
  - Syrian Arab Army: Ababil-3

=== Non-state ===
- Hamas
- Houthis: Ababil-T, rebranded as "Qasef-1".
- Hezbollah: Ababil-2, Ababil-T (rebranded as "Mirsad-1")
- Kataib Hezbollah: Ababil-3, rebranded as "Basir-1".
- (Libya) Libyan National Army: Ababil-2.

== Specifications (Ababil-2) ==
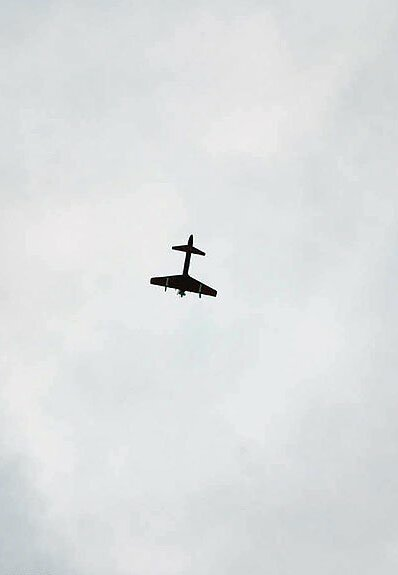
An Ababil-2 as seen from the ground.

Data from Jane's

General characteristics

- Crew: none
- Capacity: 40 kg payload
- Length: 2.88 m (9 ft 5 in)
- Wingspan: 3.25 m (10 ft 8 in)
- Height: 0.91 m (3 ft 0 in)
- Wing area: 1.76 m^{2} (18.9 sq ft)
- Empty weight: 30 kg (66 lb) approx.
- Max takeoff weight: 83 kg (183 lb)
- Fuel capacity: 16 liters
- Powerplant: 1 × WAE-342 twin-cylinder piston engine, 19 kW (25 hp)
- Propellers: 2-bladed

Performance

- Maximum speed: 370 km/h (230 mph, 200 kn) in level flight
- Cruise speed: 250–305 km/h (155–190 mph, 135–165 kn)
- Combat range: 120 km (75 mi, 65 nmi)
- Endurance: 1 ¼ – 2 hr
- Service ceiling: 3,000 m (9,800 ft) or higher

== See also ==
- Equipment of the Iranian Army

Aircraft of comparable role, configuration, and era

- Qods Mohajer (Note: The Ababil-2 compares with the Mohajer-2; the Ababil-3 compares with the Mohajer-4.)
- SAGEM Crecerelle
- Altec MART/Altec S-MART
- Aerosonde Mk 4.7
