= Qods Mohajer =

Iranian tactical UAV (1980s–present)

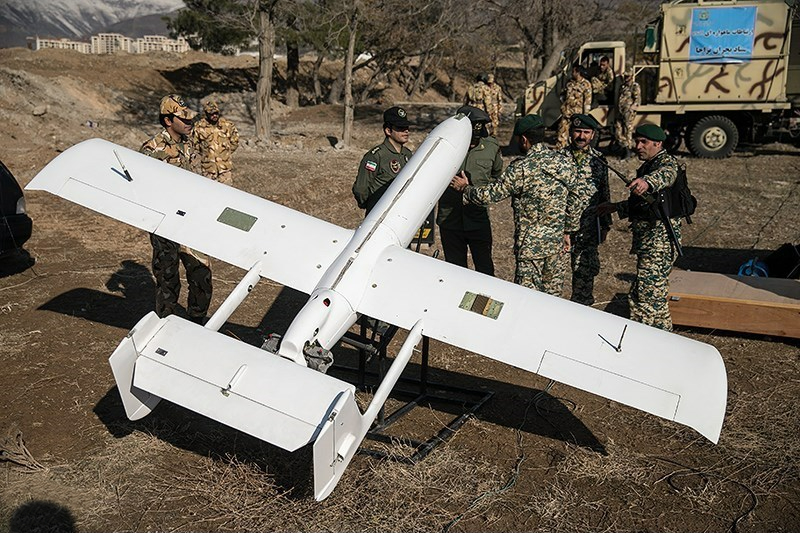
- An Iranian Mohajer-2 in 2014

General information
- Type: Light/medium intelligence, surveillance, and reconnaissance (ISR)
- National origin: Iran
- Manufacturer: Qods Aviation Industry Company, Tehran
- Designer: Qods Aviation Industry Company
- Status: In service
- Primary users: Iran Syria; Venezuela; Hezbollah
- Number built: 253 (mid-2000s)

History
- Manufactured: 1980s–present
- Introduction date: February 1986
- First flight: 1985

The Qods Mohajer (Persian: مهاجر, "Immigrant") is an Iranian single-engine tactical unmanned aerial vehicle (UAV) built by the Qods Aviation Industry Company in four main variants from the 1980s to the present day. The Mohajer family is primarily used for reconnaissance, and is among the most mature and well-known Iranian UAVs.

The Mohajer-1 was used during the Iran–Iraq War for battlefield surveillance. The Mohajer-2 was developed in the 1990s with improved avionics and range, and remains in service today. The Mohajer-4 is another evolutionary improvement with again improved range, endurance, and surveillance. The last major variant, the Mohajer-6 (UAV), is an unmanned combat aerial vehicle that carries two munitions.

The Mohajer is used by both the Iranian Army and the Islamic Revolutionary Guards Corps (IRGC). It has been exported to Iranian allies in the Middle East and has been used in the Syrian and Iraqi civil wars. In addition, the Mohajer-2 is license-built in Venezuela as the Arpia.

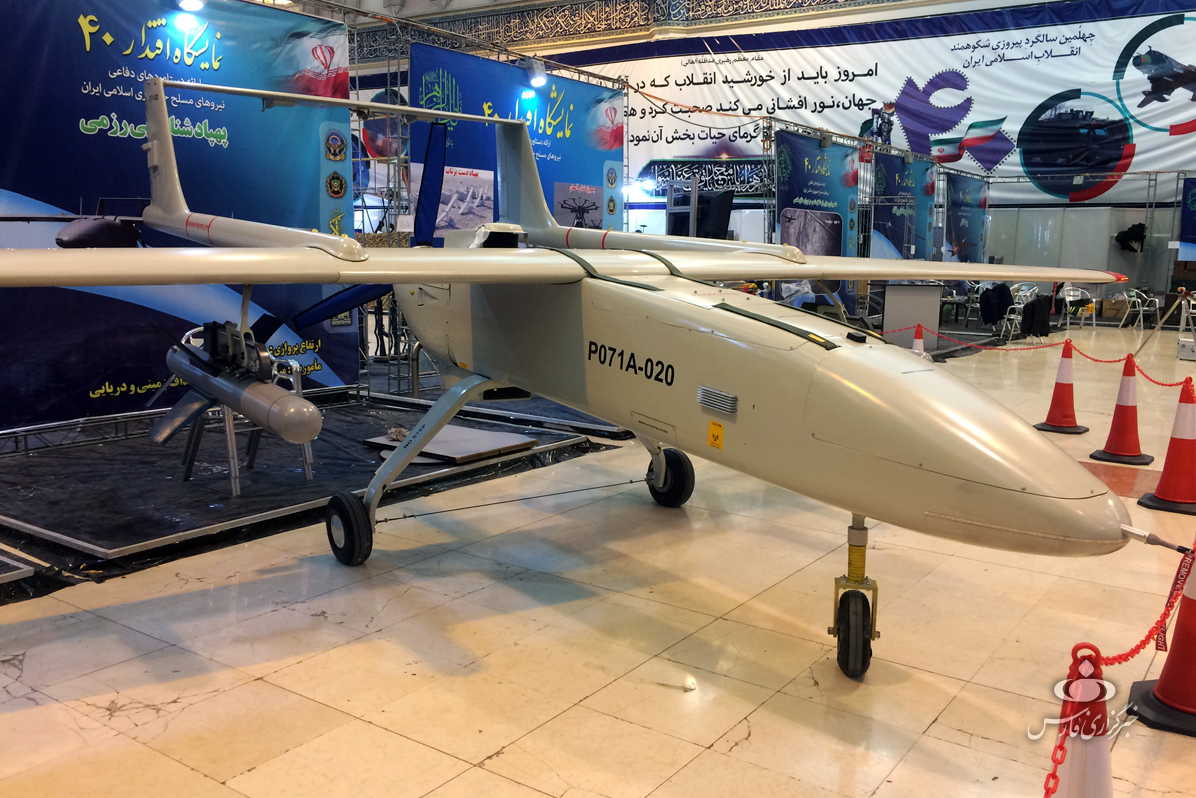
Qods Mohajer-6 UAV

== Mohajer-1 ==
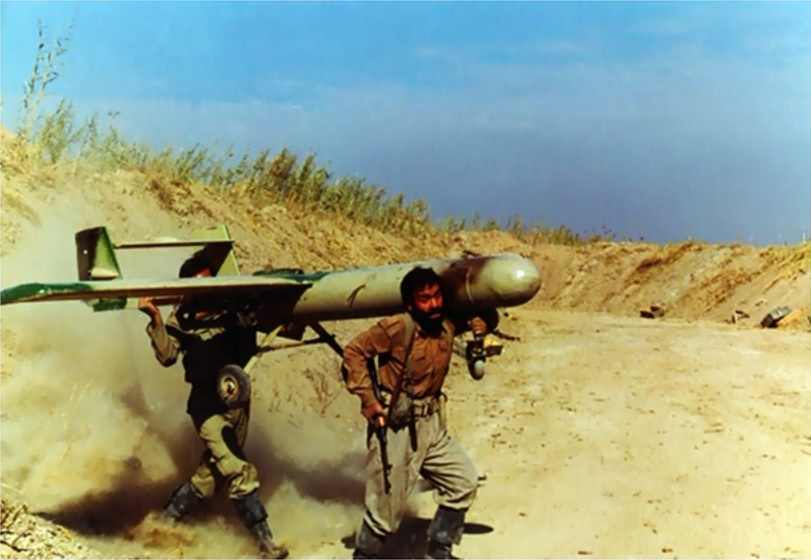
A Mohajer-1

The Mohajer was Iran's first drone to enter series production and was used during the Iran–Iraq War. The Mohajer-1 was known simply as "Mohajer" through the 80s and 90s, when it was re-designated "Mohajer-1" as other Mohajer variants had been developed.

=== Design ===
The Mohajer-1 had a narrow cylindrical fuselage, twin tailbooms, and straight wings mounted high and to the rear of the body. It had a single engine (unknown model) in a pusher configuration, and was guided by ailerons on the wings, an elevator on the horizontal stabilizer, and rudders on the tailbooms. The Mohajer-1 had three fixed landing gear for launch and recovery. It could also be recovered by parachute. The Mohajer-1 was about 8 feet long and had a wingspan of about 10 feet.

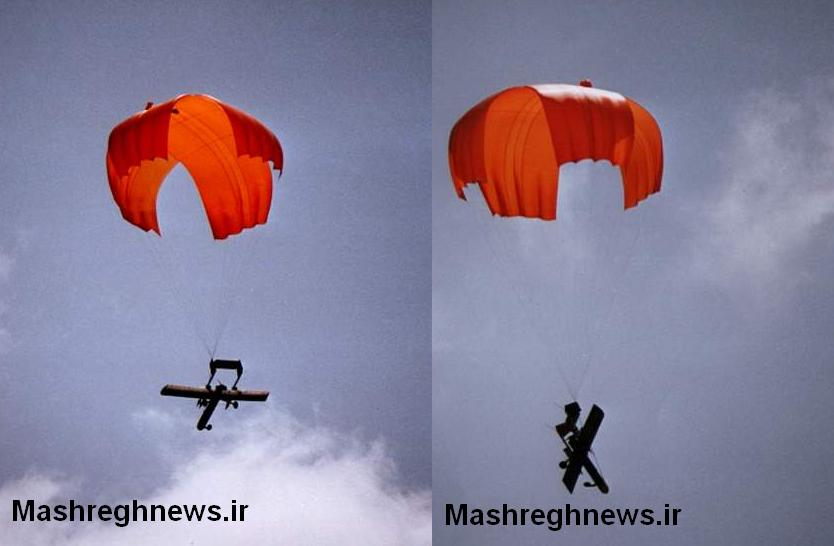
Parachute recovery of a Mohajer-1

The Mohajer-1 carried a single still camera, probably carrying photographic film developed after the drone landed. It was controlled by hobby-class radio, which was easily jammed. In addition, Iran attempted to arm it with six RPG-7 rockets, three under each wing, though this was not very successful.

=== Performance ===
The Mohajer-1's range is not definitively known, but was severely limited by the hobbyist radio link and lack of an autopilot system, which meant that the aircraft could only surveil Iraqi positions when operated from the Iranian front lines. One source suggests the Mohajer-1 was only able to penetrate 3 km into Iraqi lines. On the other hand, another source says the Mohajer-1 had a range of 50 km, and still another source lists a range of 30 km; this may reflect a difference between the aircraft's theoretical range and its real-world performance. There are no details on the Mohajer-1's airspeed, endurance, or ceiling.

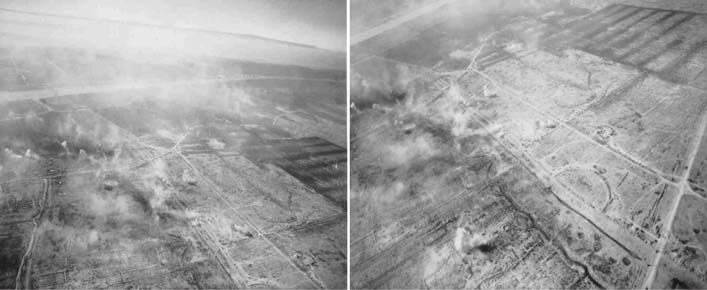
These photos, taken by a Mohajer-1, were used by Iran to spot artillery fire during Operation Karbala 5.

=== Operational history ===
Qods Aviation was formed in 1985 and four Mohajer-1s were built that year. The Mohajer-1 was operated by the IRGC's Raad Brigade and was used to correct artillery fire and photograph enemy positions. The Mohajer-1's first known use was in Operation Dawn 8 in 1986. It was also used in Karbala 5 in 1987. Mohajer UAVs photographed Iraqi lines until the end of the war and completed 619 sorties by the war's end, taking 53,772 photographs in total. The Mohajer-1 is out of service today.

Though the Mohjajer-1 is primitive by today's standards and was essentially a hobbyist-class drone, the Iranians were satisfied with its performance, as it was one of only two Iranian surveillance assets in the war, along with RF-4s.

== Mohajer-2 ==
Following the successful use of the Mohajer-1, Iran wanted a version with more range and endurance. This version, which would later be named the Mohajer-2, also had an auto pilot system to fly beyond the line-of-control of its command center. The Mohajer-2 was developed in the 1990s and first seen in 1996. It was designed for surveillance use and as of 2011 more than 200 Mohajer-2s had been built.

=== Design ===
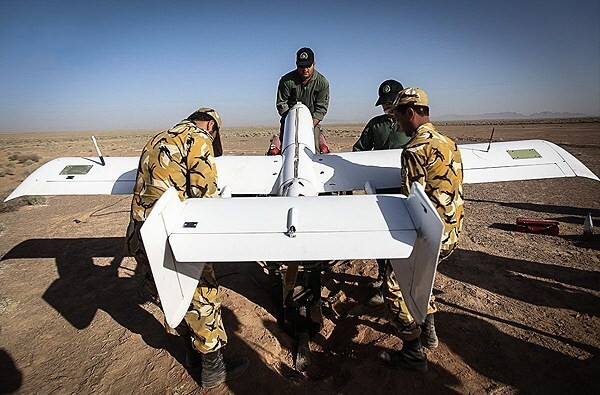
Iranian personnel prepare a Mohajer-2 for launch.

The Mohajer-2 has a bullet-shaped fuselage, mid-mounted, untapered wings, twin tailbooms, twin rudders, belly skids, and a horizontal tail. The belly skids are non-retractable, but can compress on landing to reduce shock. Apart from the skids, it is essentially a refinement of the Mohajer-1 design. Its airframe is composed substantially of composite materials. The Mohajer-2 is 2.91m long and has a wingspan of 3.8 meters. It is powered by a 25 hp WAE-342 two-cylinder engine.

The Mohajer-2 has an autopilot system, which is able to maintain airspeed, altitude, and stability in flight. The autopilot system can control the aircraft's course via waypoints, or it can be controlled in real time from a ground control station. Like other Iranian drones, the Mohajer-2 lacks over-the-horizon guidance. The Mohajer-2 has a still or video (color or monochrome) camera, either fixed downwards for aerial surveying or mounted on a gimbal for surveillance. In addition, it has a fixed forwards-facing camera for navigation. (Note: Early Mohajer-2s lack this camera.) There is no evidence the Mohajer-2 has been fitted with an infrared camera. It has an onboard digital processor and can downlink sensor imagery. The Mohajer-2 has two stub antenna in the under 10 GHz range, one on each wing, for real-time control. Prototype Mohajer-2s were fitted with two rocket pods for 12 RPG-7 rockets, similar to the Mohajer-1's, but this model did not enter production. The Mohajer-2 has a GPS guidance system.

The Mohajer-2 is launched from a PL3 pneumatic catapult, which can be truck-mounted, wheeled, or ship-mounted. It can also be launched from a JATO platform, though this is uncommon. It is recovered by skid landing or parachute.

=== Performance ===
Has an endurance of 1.5 hours and range of 50 km. The Mohajer-2 is about ten feet long and has a wingspan of about 12 feet. The tail wingspan is exactly 3 ft.

=== Operational history ===
During the 1990s Afghan civil war, Mohajer drones reportedly monitored the situation. A Mohajer (unknown variant) may have been shot down over Iraq on 19 April 2001. The Mohajer-2 is also known to be operated by Hezbollah. Mohajer-2s have been extensively used by the Syrian Arab Army against rebels during the Syrian civil war.

In addition to its military use, the Mohajer-2 can also be used for weather reporting.

It is possible, but unconfirmed, that the Raad-85 is a variant of the Mohajer-2.

=== Arpia ===
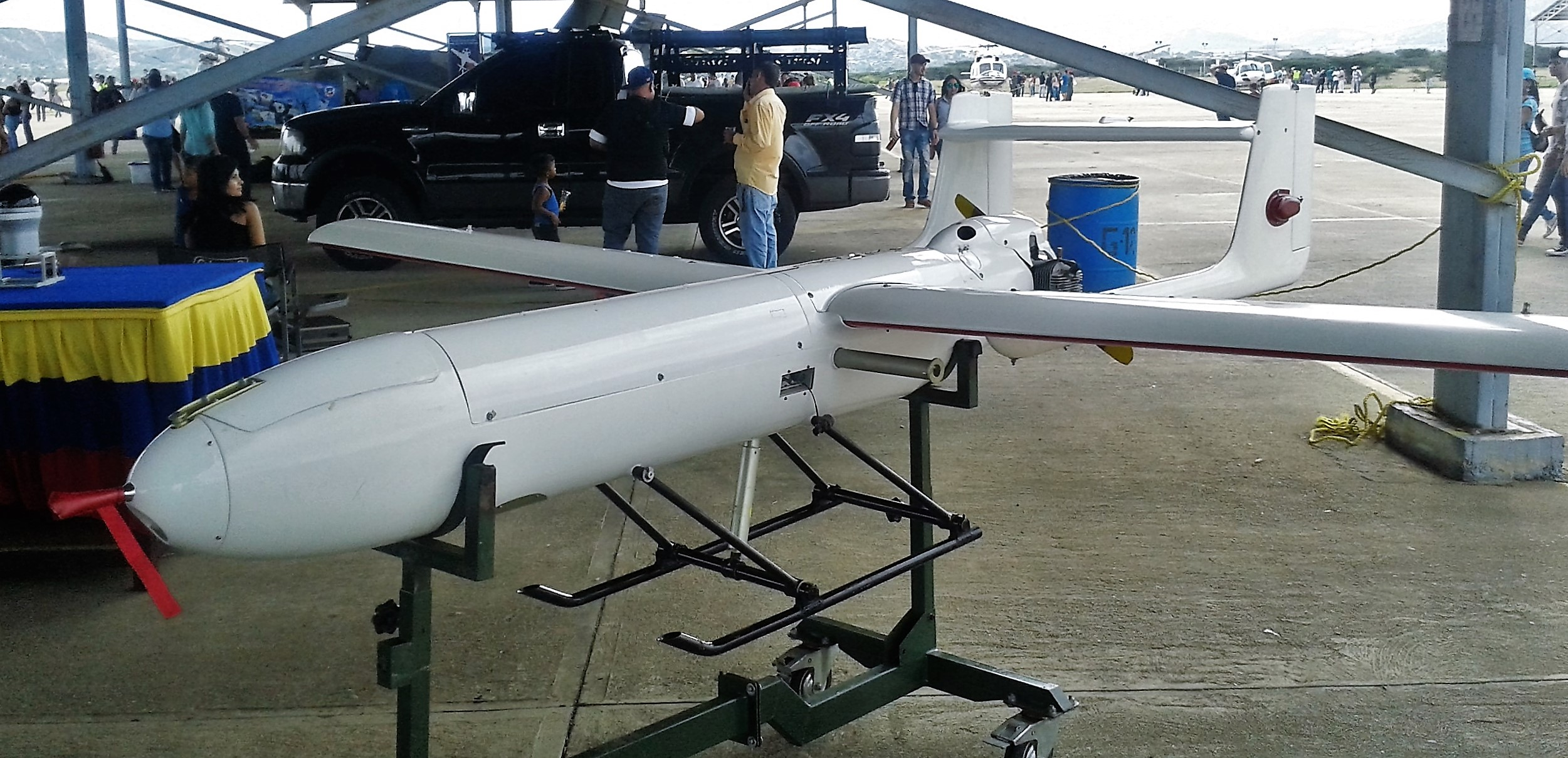
Venezuelan Arpia, a license-built copy of the Mohajer-2

In 2007, Venezuela signed an agreement with Iran to assemble 12 Mohajer-2 UAVs from knock-down kits supplied by Quds. Venezuelan state-owned defense contractor CAVIM began assembling the drones by 2009. US satellite imagery revealed the facility manufacturing the drones in 2010, and they were unveiled to the public as the CAVIM Arpia in 2012. Venezuela signed a $28 million contract to manufacture the UAVs, though it is unclear why, because this far exceeds the drones' value.

These are reportedly known as the ANSU-100.

=== Mohajer-2N ===
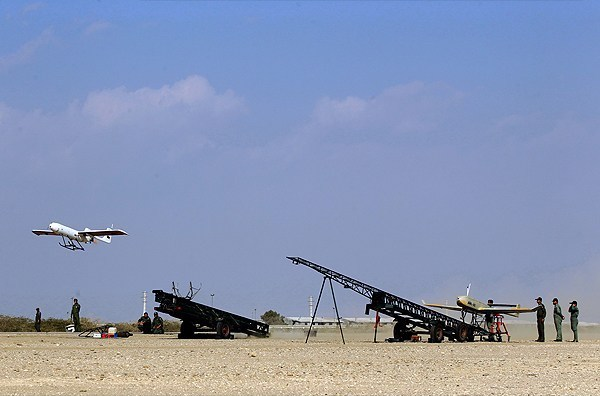
A Mohajer-2N in flight.

In 2014, Iran introduced the Mohajer-2N, which shares the same design as the Mohajer-2 but has far improved performance. The Mohajer-2N replaces the electronics of the Mohajer-2 with more modern versions and also has improved flight characteristics. The Mohajer-2N has a range of 150 km and flight endurance of 6 hours. It is believed this is accomplished through fuel tanks in the wings combined with weight savings elsewhere. Cruise speed is 180 km/h. Body material is composite. The Mohajer-2N is also capable of transmitting imagery in real time. Like most Mohajer-2s, the Mohajer-2N has two cameras; one under the nose for navigation, and a second on a gimbal under the body for surveillance.

Visually, the Mohajer-2N is nearly identical to the Mohajer-2. It is mainly "distinguished" by being 1 cm longer, having a wingspan 2 cm wider, and being five kg heavier. It can be fitted with the Mohajer-2's landing skids or with wheeled landing gear. The Mohajer-2N is recovered by skid landing or parachute.

== Mohajer-3 ==
The Mohajer-3, also known as the Dorna, was designed with a new airframe for better performance. It had a square body and featured a low-mounted horizontal stabilizer flush with the main wing, the only member of the Mohajer family configured this way. The Mohajer-3 could be fitted with fixed landing gear, for a runway takeoff, or with skids for a JATO launch. It was recovered by parachute or skid landing. It was powered by an unidentified 25 hp (18.6 kW) piston engine. The Mohajer-3 was announced in 1999.

The Mohajer-3 had a color/monochrome still or video camera, and was able to send images in real time. and It had a range of 100 km, an endurance of 2–3 hours, and a cruise speed of 180 km/h. It did not have GPS guidance.

It was developed contemporaneously with the Mohajer-4 and did not enter service.

== Mohajer-4 ==
A Mohajer-4

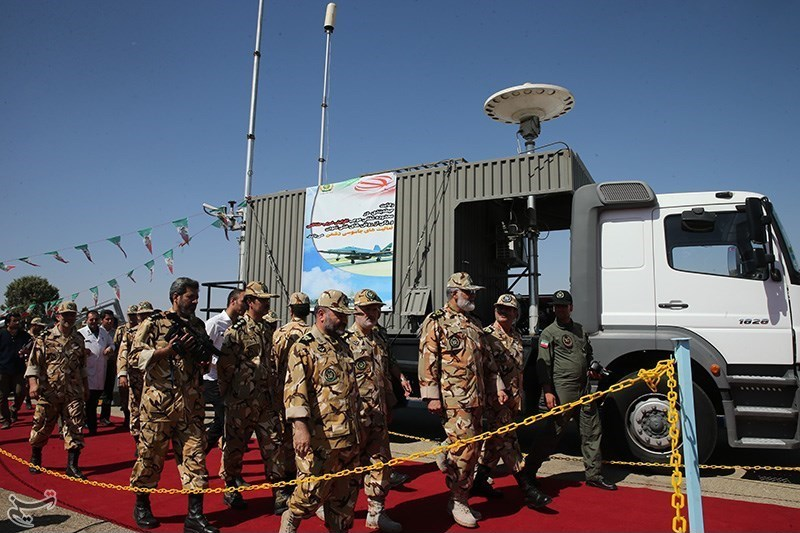
The Mohajer-4's ground control station

The Mohajer-4 was designed for both the Iranian Army and the IRGC and entered service in late 1997. It may have entered mass production in 1999. It was first documented in 2003. Sources differ slightly on how many have been built; one sources says that 40 have been built as of 2006, while another says that as of the mid-2000s, 34 had been built.

=== Design ===
The Mohajer-4 features a squarish body and low-mounted trapezoidal wings with upward-canted wingtips to lessen drag. It is powered by a two-bladed Limbach L550E four-cylinder, two-stroke 50 hp engine in a pusher configuration. (Note: Some prototypes were equipped with different engines.) The Mohajer-4 is constructed of composite material. It is 3.64 m long and has a wingspan of 5.3 m. The Mohajer-4 has a modular design, and components such as the body, wings, and tailbooms can be detached and recombined.

It has three landing skids. The Mohajer-4 can land via landing gear or a parachute.

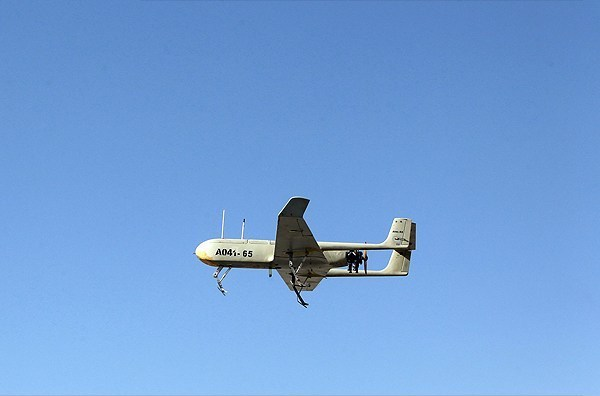
An Iranian Mohajer-4 in flight

The Mohajer-4 has a Hyarat 3 guidance and control system, which includes GPS navigation. It normally follows a preprogrammed flight path, but its mission profile can also be updated in flight via radio uplink. The Mohajer-4 has a fixed forward-facing camera for navigation and either a downward-facing camera for aerial surveying or a gimbal-mounted video camera for surveillance. Sources disagree on whether the Mojajer-4 can carry an infrared camera. Like the Mohajer-2, it has an onboard digital processor and can downlink sensor imagery. The Mohajer-4 is also reportedly capable of being fitted for communications relay and has an 'impressive' electronic warfare capability.

=== Performance ===
Operational range is increased to 150 km, altitude to 18000 feet and endurance to 7 hours. With a MTOW of 175 kg, the Mohajer-4 is almost double the weight of older versions.

The Mohajer-4 and 4B are operated by a crew of 5-7 men, including two operators. One operator controls the UAV's camera and the ground control station's directional antenna for real time video transfer. The other operator controls the UAV's flight using a software program called FliteMap, which is COTS American software.

In common with other Qods Aviation products, the Mohajer-4 can be ineffectively armed with unguided rockets, in this case a total of two Hydra 70 rockets under the wings.

=== Operational history ===
On November 7, 2004, Hezbollah flew a UAV over northern Israel for about 5 minutes. The UAV entered Israeli airspace at more than 100 knots and an altitude of about 1,000 feet, flew briefly over the seaside city of Nahariya, and fell into the sea. Some sources have identified the UAV as a Mohajer-4. There are reports that Iran sold eight Mohajer-4s to Hezbollah.

Mohajer-4s have been extensively used by the Syrian Army during the Syrian civil war. On 16 May 2015, the Turkish Air Force shot down a Mohajer-4 that violated its airspace. Mohajer-4s have also crashed, or been shot down, over Islamic State-held territories. A Mohajer-4 in Iraqi markings was downed over Iraq, but it is not clear if the UAV was actually being operated by the Iraqi Armed Forces.

Mohajer-4s are located at Iran's Konorak Air Base and at Bandar Jask. There is a designation of the Mohajer-4 called "Shahin", which may be a sub-variant with unknown differences, or a designation for the Mohajer-4 in Iranian Army Ground service. There is also another sub-variant with unknown differences called the "Hodhod A/100".

In addition, Mohajer-4s are used by Iran's border guard to interdict drug smuggling.

=== Mohajer-4B ===
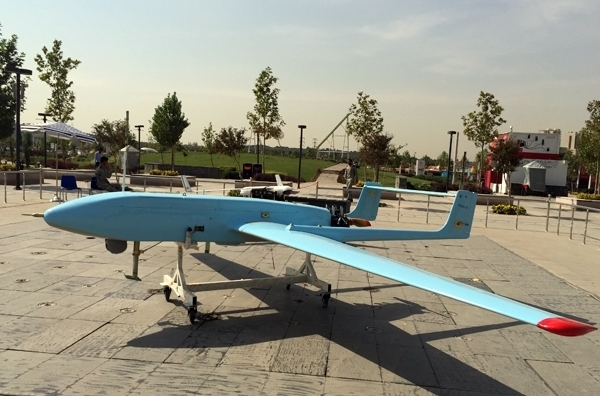
Mohajer-4B variant.

Also known as the Sadiq, the Mohajer-4B is a significant evolution of the Mohajer-4 platform with a square fuselage, twin tailbooms, a top-mounted horizontal stabilizer, uncanted wingtips, new landing skids, and straight wings mounted high and to the mid of the body. It was introduced in late 2014. All serial numbers begin "P062A–".

The Mohajer-4B was designed for reconnaissance and has a fixed, forward-facing camera for navigation. With an expanded payload bay, it can carry an IR/EO sensor mounted on a gimbal and a downward-facing surveying camera at the same time, unlike the Mohajer-2 and Mohajer-4, which could only carry one at a time. The Mohajer-4B has a flight ceiling of 15,000 feet, a (max) speed of 200 km/h, and an operational radius of 200 km. It weighs 242 kg and has an endurance of 6 hours. It may have a wingspan of approximately 7 meters.

An estimated 36 Mohajer-4Bs have been built as of 2015. Mohajer-4Bs have been used over Syria. A Mohajer-4B flew over, and was reportedly shot down by, the USS Boxer on 18 July 2019.

=== Sadegh-1 ===
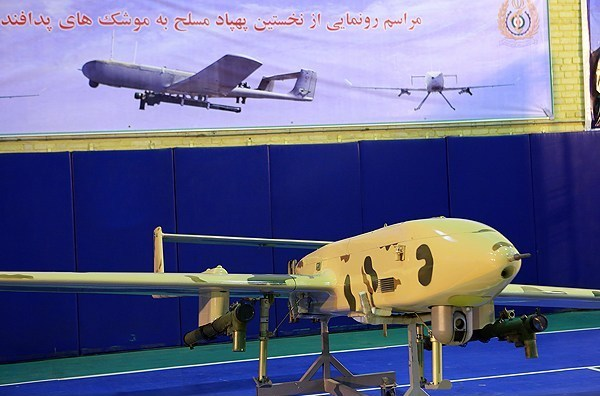
A Sadegh-1

The Sadegh-1 ("Honest-1"), also known as the QOM-1, is simply a Mohajer-4B with two MANPADS mounted on pylons. It was tested in late 2014 and was used to harass a US Navy jet fighter in 2017. The integration work is believed to be performed by Shahid Shah Abhady Industrial Complex. Western assessments of the Sadgh-1 range from "it probably doesn't work very well" to "fakery." Another source speculates it might be useful for air defense for Iranian-backed militia groups in Lebanon and Gaza.

== Mohajer-6 ==
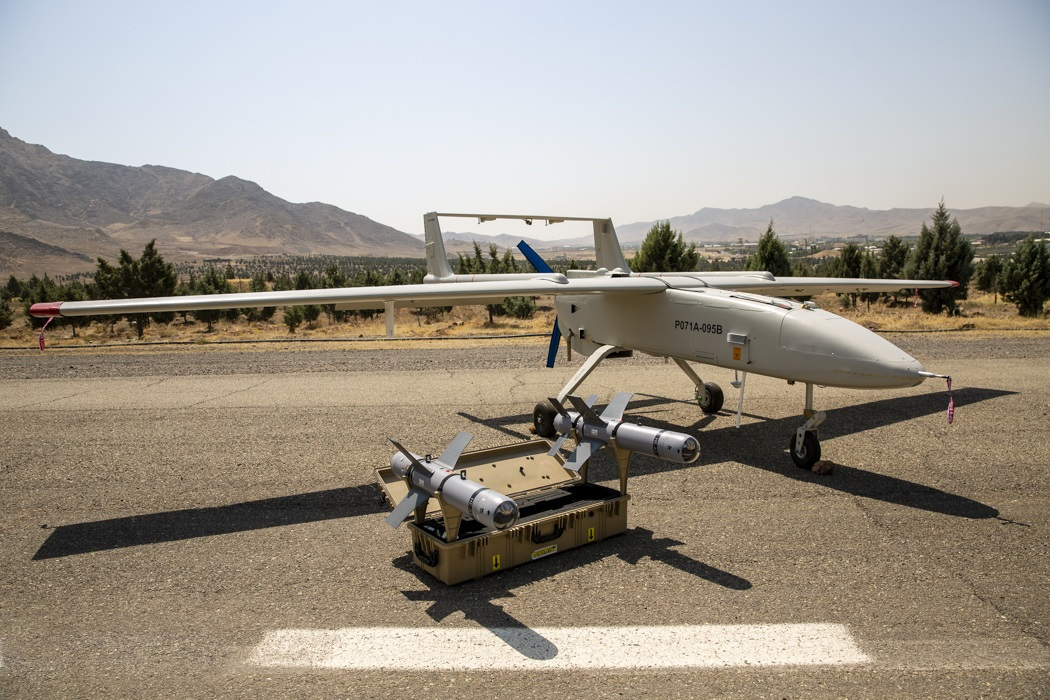
A Mohajer-6 drone in 2021

The Mohajer-6 (Persian: پهپاد مهاجر-6) retains the same form as prior Mohajer versions, but is significantly larger. It is capable of carrying guided bombs and more advanced surveillance equipment. It has been used in combat by Iran and exported to several Iranian allies.

== Operators ==
- Iran
  - IRGC: Mohajer-1 (former) Mohajer-4, Mohajer-6 and Sadegh-1.
    - IRGC Ground Forces: Mohajer-2, Mohajer-4 and Mohajer-6.
  - Islamic Republic of Iran Army Ground Forces: Mohajer-2 Mohajer-2N, Mohajer-4, Mohajer-4B and Mohajer-6
  - Islamic Republic of Iran Air Force: Mohajer-4, Mohajer-6.
  - Islamic Republic of Iran Border Guard Command: Mohajer-2, Mohajer-4
- Tajikistan: Mohajer-2
- Venezuela: Licensed design of the Mohajer-2, known locally as Arpia. 12 were acquired.
  - PDVSA
  - Venezuelan Air Force, Mohajer-1 (former) Mohajer-4, Mohajer-6 , 83rd UAV Squadron Also used by the No. 8 Intelligence Air Group.

=== Non-state operators ===
- Hezbollah: Mohajer-2 and Mohajer-4
- Libyan National Army: Mohajer-2
- Al Wehda: Mohajer-4, Mohajer-6

=== Former operators ===
- Ba'athist Syria: Mohajer-2 and Mohajer-4.

== Specifications (Mohajer-2) ==
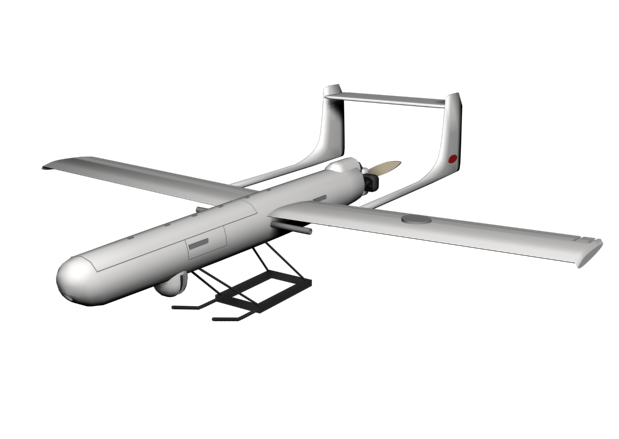

Data from Galen Wright

General characteristics

- Crew: none
- Capacity: 15 kg payload
- Length: 2.91 m (9 ft 7 in)
- Wingspan: 3.8 m (12 ft 6 in)
- Empty weight: 70 kg (154 lb)
- Max takeoff weight: 85 kg (187 lb)
- Powerplant: 1 × WAE-342 twin-cylinder piston engine, 19 kW (25 hp)
- Propellers: 2-bladed

Performance

- Maximum speed: 200 km/h (120 mph, 110 kn)
- Range: 50 km (31 mi, 27 nmi)
- Endurance: 1.5h
- Service ceiling: 3,350 m (10,990 ft)

== See also ==
- Shahed 129

Aircraft of comparable role, configuration, and era

- HESA Ababil (Note: The Ababil-2 compares with the Mohajer-2; the Ababil-3 compares with the Mohajer-4.)
- SAGEM Crecerelle
- Altec MART/Altec S-MART
- Aerosonde Mk 4.7
