= QinetiQ Banshee =

Series of British target drones

Banshee
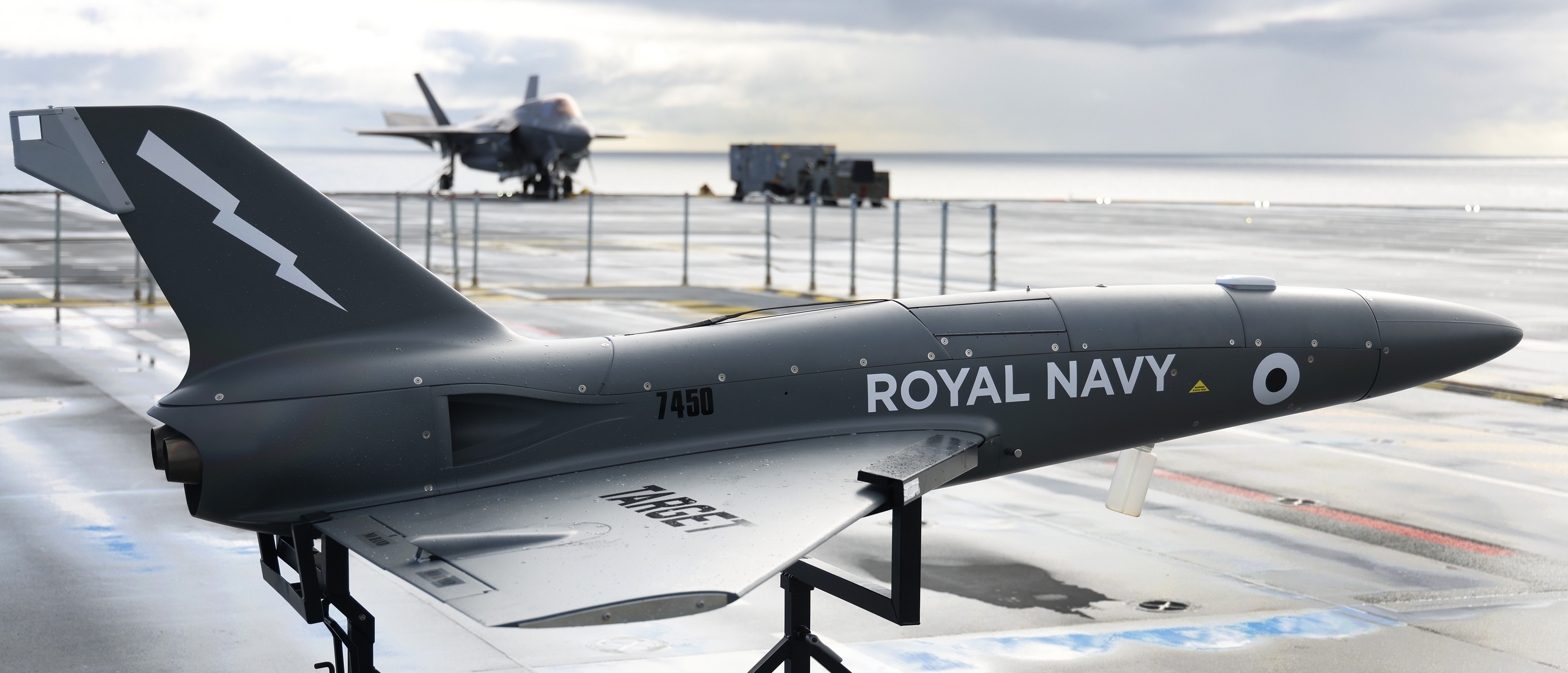
- A Banshee Jet 80 onboard HMS Prince of Wales

General information
- Type: Target Drone, Reconnaissance
- National origin: United Kingdom
- Manufacturer: QinetiQ
- Status: In service
- Primary user: Worldwide
- Number built: over 10,000 in 2025 ("over 6,000" before 2011, "over 8,000" in 2014)

History
- Introduction date: 1984
- First flight: 1983
- Developed into: SAGEM Crecerelle

The Banshee, formerly the Target Technology Banshee or BTT3 Banshee, then Meggitt Banshee, is a series of British target drones developed from the 1980s for air defence system training. In December 2016, Meggitt's target drone subsidiary, Meggitt Target Systems, was sold to QinetiQ for £57.5 million and versions of the drone are now simply named after "Banshee". The most recent common version is the 2021 Banshee Jet 80+.

== Design and development ==
=== Propeller versions ===
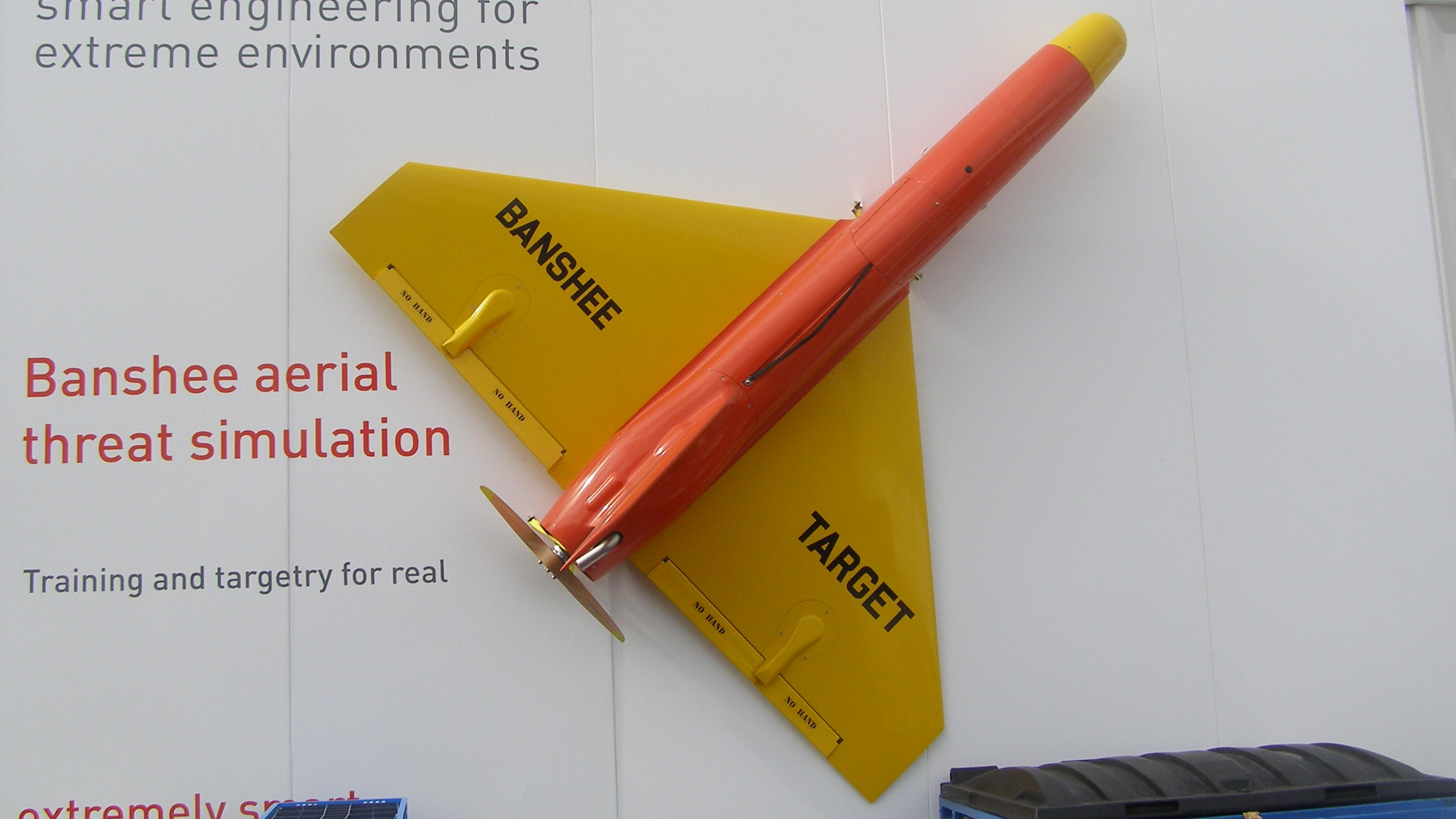
Meggitt Banshee on display in 2010

The Banshee was originally developed by Target Technology Ltd. The company had been specialising in lightweight engines for drones and had developed its own design in 1983.

Banshee is built mostly out of composite material (Kevlar and glass-reinforced plastic) with a tailless delta wing planform. The first models used a 26 hp 342 cc Normalair-Garrett two-cylinder two-stroke driving a pusher propeller. Performance was 35 to 185 knots (65 to 343 km/h; 40 to 213 mph) with an endurance from one to three hours. Flight control is by two elevons.

Later models used Norton P73 wankel engines. Some versions of the Banshee can be used for reconnaissance.

The Banshee Whirlwind is a currently marketed remotely piloted version using a 40 kg thrust rotary engine, with a typical mission endurance of 90 minutes and a parachute for recovery.

=== Jet versions ===
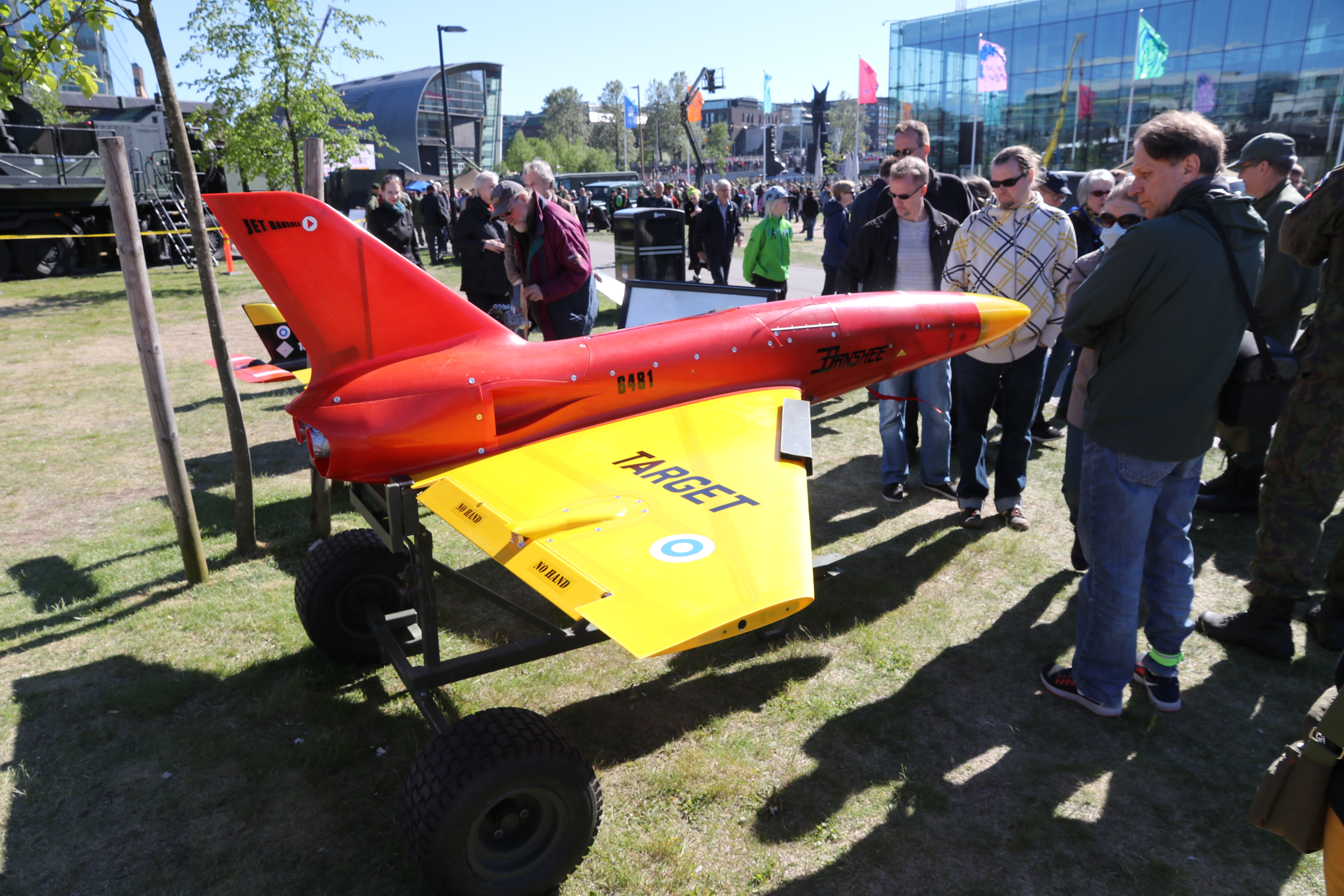
Banshee Jet 80 on display in 2017

A single jet engine version with 40 kg of thrust was developed and entered service in 2010, later named the Banshee Jet 40. It was improved into the Banshee Jet 40+, which is still marketed in 2024.

A faster twin-jet engine version called the Banshee Jet 80 entered service in 2014, with a forward and side-looking infrared source in the nose to create, alongside the jet engines, a realistic rearward infrared target. It has a maximum airspeed of 180 m/s (650 km/h), and with an auxiliary fuel tank it has an endurance of over 45 minutes.

In September 2021 the Royal Navy trialed an improved variant called the Banshee Jet 80+. This version has a typical endurance in excess of 45 minutes, a maximum airspeed of 200 m/s (720 km/h), an operating range in excess of 100 km and altitude range of 5–9,144 m (16–30,000 ft). Target characteristics can be changed by using plug-in modules. On 9 April 2025, the Royal Navy 700X Naval Air Squadron two year trial came to a close, and it was retired from trials service. It will continue to be used as a target drone elsewhere in the British military.

As of 2019, QinetiQ was developing the Banshee Next Generation (NG).

From 2022 to 2024 the US Department of Defense and QinetiQ were developing the Rattler Supersonic Target MkI, conducted the first test flights at White Sands Missile Range High Energy Laser Systems Test Facility (HELSTF) in March 2024. The Rattler ST is carried aloft by a Banshee Jet 80+, and emulate a variety of advanced missile threats at speeds up to Mach 2.6.

== Operational history ==
Banshee entered service with the British Army in the mid-1980s as an aerial target for the Short Blowpipe and Javelin shoulder-launched missiles.

Banshee has been deployed in over 40 countries. Early versions were tested against Blowpipe, Chaparral, Crotale, Javelin, Phalanx, Rapier, Hisar (including Hisar O+ and Siper), Sea Sparrow, QRSAM, Akash SAM (including Akash-NG) and Barak 8 SAM systems.

In 2023, the US Army Threat Systems Management Office (TSMO) purchased a specialised version of its Banshee Jet 80+ known as the MQM-185B, compatible with its Army Ground Aerial Target Control System (AGATCS).

In April 2024, QinetiQ collaborated with the UK Ministry of Defence to demonstrate the UK's first teaming between a crewed aircraft and an autonomous drone. The drone used in the trials was a Banshee Jet 80 which was controlled by the crewed aircraft to conduct a mission assignment.

In October 2025 a Ukrainian military delegation visited Denmark and successfully demonstrated their Sting interceptor drone against a Banshee drone.

=== Russo-Ukrainian War ===
In May 2023, the UK reportedly supplied Ukraine with Banshees which had been modified as one-way attack drones. The remains of a Banshee were discovered, equipped with a 7 kg warhead, by Russians in Donetsk in February 2024. The drone is either a Meggitt Banshee drone or a copy of one. Jet powered, it has a 7 kg explosive warhead and a range of 100 kilometres (62 mi).

In 2024, Ukrainian media reported that the British government had decided in May 2023 to give strike-adapted Banshee Jet 80+ drones to Ukraine, with a one-way range of up to 200 kilometres (120 mi).

== Operators ==
- Brunei Darussalam
- Brazil
- Denmark - operated by the Inter Service Drone Section
- Egypt
- Finland
- France
- Germany
- Hungary
- Indonesia
- Italy
- Norway
- Oman
- Turkey
- United Kingdom
- United States
- Ukraine

== Variants ==
- Banshee 300 - (1988)
- Banshee 400 - Reconnaissance (2001)
- Banshee 500 - First model to include all epoxy based composite construction
- Banshee 600 - Evolution of the 500 variant
- Banshee Whirlwind - Rotary engine
- Banshee Jet 40 - Single turbine (2010)
- Banshee Jet 40+ - Single turbine
- Banshee Jet 80 - Twin turbine (2014)
- Banshee Jet 80+ - Twin turbine (2021)

The French SAGEM Crecerelle reconnaissance UAV is based on the Meggitt Banshee (now Banshee 300/400).

== Specifications Meggitt BTT-3 Banshee ==
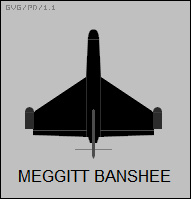
Banshee top-view silhouette

Data from Meggitt

General characteristics

- Crew: None
- Length: 2.84 m (9 ft 4 in)
- Wingspan: 2.49 m (8 ft 2 in)
- Height: 0.86 m (2 ft 10 in)
- Empty weight: 39 kg (85 lb)
- Gross weight: 73 kg (160 lb)
- Powerplant: 1 × Norton P73 Wankel rotary engine, 28 kW (38 hp)

Performance

- Maximum speed: 200 km/h (120 mph, 110 kn)
- Endurance: 1 hour 15 minutes
- Service ceiling: 7,000 m (23,000 ft)

== On Display ==
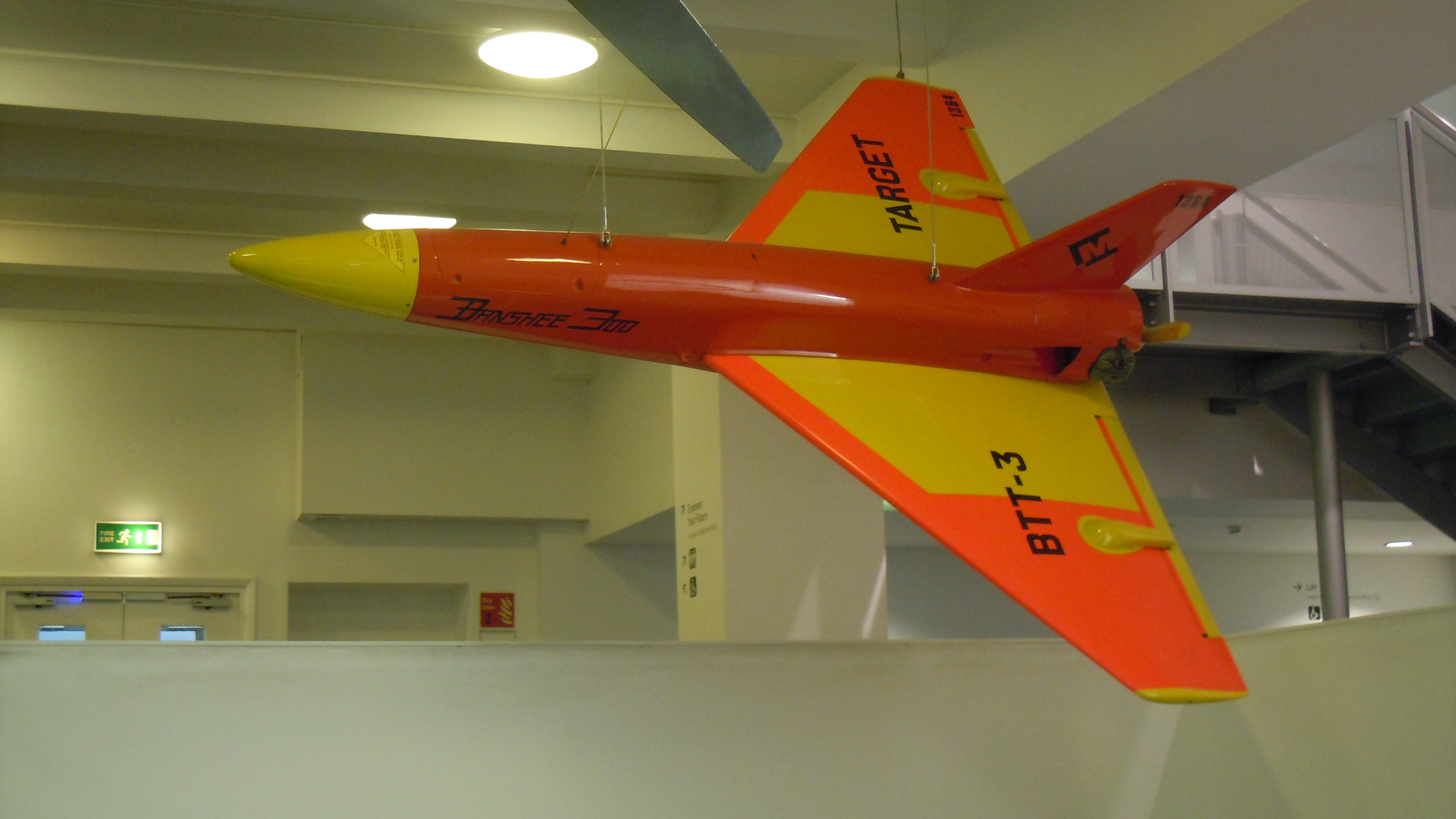
Meggitt Banshee target drone at the Science Museum, London (2017)

- Serial 1364 - Science Museum, London
- Serial 3088 - City of Norwich Aviation Museum
