= Qods Talash =

Iranian unmanned aerial vehicle

Talash (UAV)
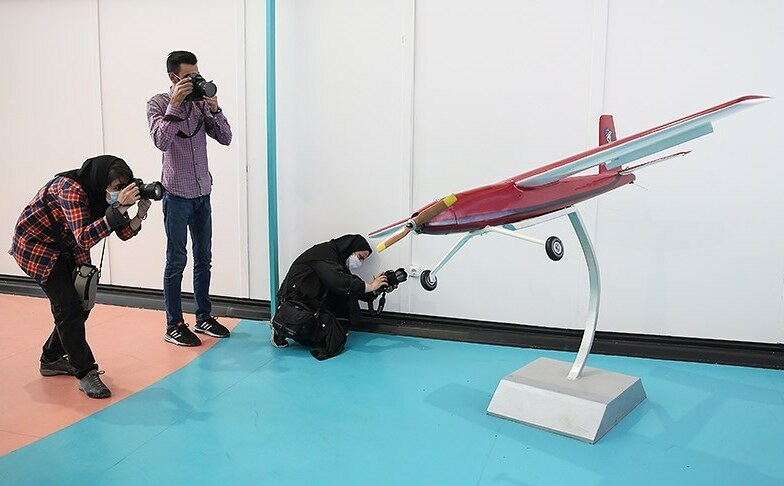
- Talash-2 UAV

General information
- Type: Training UAV
- National origin: Iran
- Manufacturer: Qods Aviation Industry Company, Tehran
- Designer: Academic Center for Education, Culture and Research of Isfahan Academic Center for Education, Culture and Research of Isfahan (Designer)
- Status: In service
- Number built: Not mentioned

History
- Manufactured: Qods Aviation Industry Company

Talash (Persian: تلاش) or "Hadaf (Target) UAV" is a simple Iranian unmanned aerial vehicle (UAV). It is the first drone produced by Iranian drone maker Quds Air Industries, and achieves a maximum speed of 140 km/h.

The Talash is based on plans drawn up by Isfahan Academic Center for Education, Culture and Research (Isfahan University Jihad) researchers in 1985. The Talash UAV has small dimensions, is controlled by pulse-code modulation (PCM) radio control, and can perform a variety of in-flight maneuvers, including rolls and turns.

There are 2 models of the Talash, namely Talash-1 and Talash-2, which have several differences. The speed of the first model (Talash-1) is 120 km/h, whereas Talash-2's speed is 140 km/h. Talash-1 has landing gear (wheels) for takeoff and landing. Talash-2 drone has more speed/maneuverability than the first model. This model of drone is utilized to get up from the JATO launcher (compressed gas launcher) and to recover from the parachute. The flight ceiling of the "Talash-2 unmanned aerial vehicle" is 2,700 meters, and the flight duration of the UAV is about 45 minutes. The Talash 2 can be identified by a longer nose and raked wingtips. Both versions are powered by a 30 cc two-stroke single-cylinder engine. Control of the Talash is limited to just 0.5 km.

The Talash-1 is a training UAV used to train ground operators in close-range remote piloting techniques. The Talash 2 was designed as a basic training target for anti-aircraft systems. Talash drones have a secondary purpose of harassing the enemy, who may believe it is a threat and take cover.

== See also ==
- Islamic Republic of Iran Armed Forces
- Defense industry of Iran
- List of military equipment manufactured in Iran
- Islamic Republic of Iran Army Ground Forces
