= Mirsad-1 =

Hezbollah unmanned aerial vehicle designation

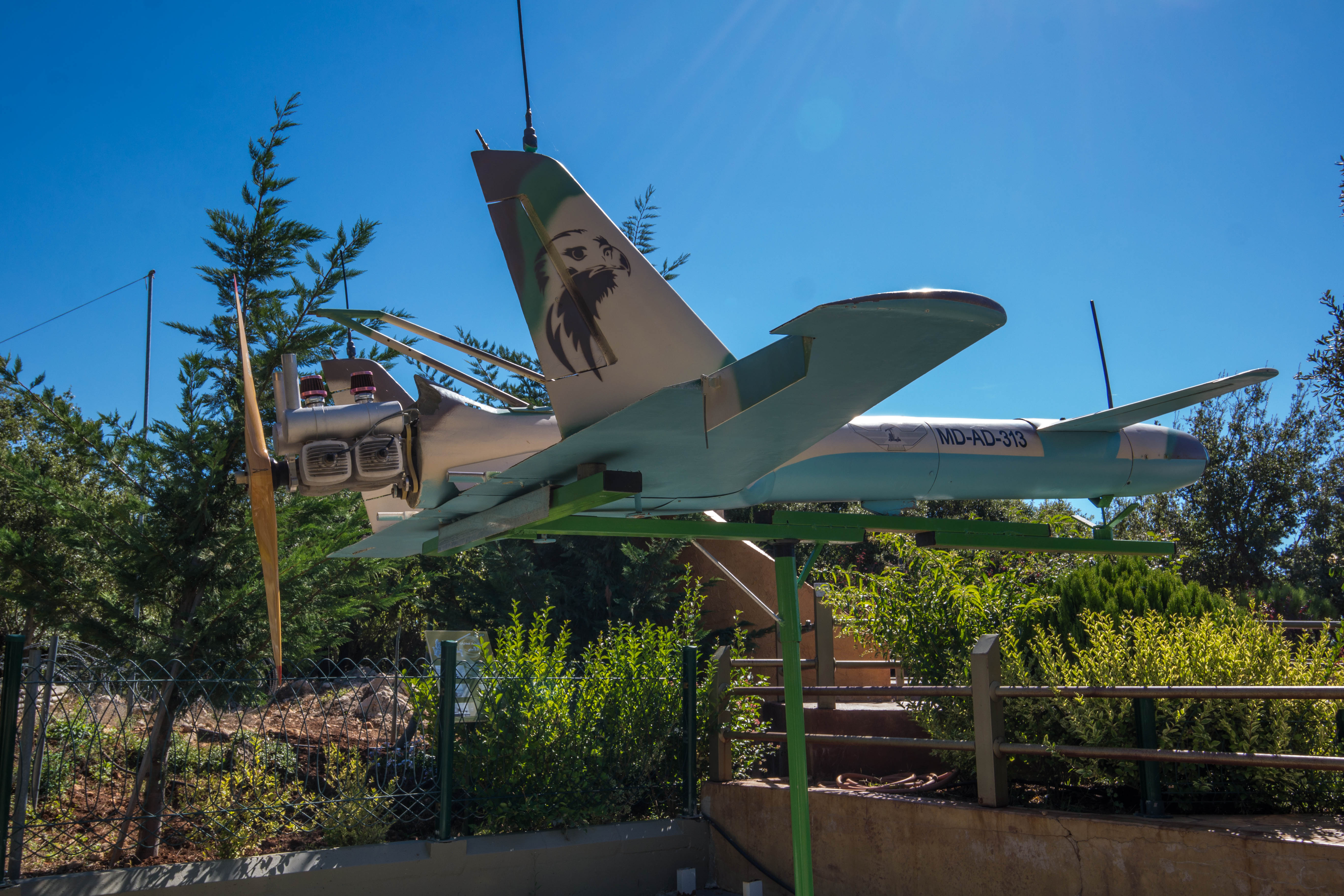
Mirsad-1 on display

The Mirsad-1 (Arabic: مرصاد, English: "Observation post"), known in Iran as the Ababil-T, is a designation for a small unmanned aerial vehicle (UAV) used for reconnaissance purposes by the Lebanese militant group Hezbollah in the 2000s, where it entered Israel on two occasions, in 2004 and 2005.

The Mirsad-1 is not a Hezbollah-designed UAV. Instead, it is a name given by Hezbollah to existing Iranian UAVs provided to the group, namely the twin-tail Ababil drones. Before 2006, Hezbollah acquired up to eight such drones from Iran. Reports state that up to 30 Hezbollah personnel also received training on operating the Mirsad at the Iranian Revolutionary Guards' bases near Isfahan, Iran. Hassan Nasrallah, who was Secretary-General of Hezbollah, boasted about the drones, saying that they "can be laden with a quantity of explosives of up to 40 to 50 kilograms" and can reach "deep" into Israel.

In 2024, during the Israel–Hezbollah conflict, the Mirsad-1 drone breached Israeli defenses and targeted an IDF military base in Binyamina, leaving 4 soldiers killed and more than 60 people injured, in what was described as the "biggest attack on Israel since the October 7 massacre".

== Use ==
The first Mirsad-1 flight into Israeli airspace occurred mid-morning on November 7, 2004. The drone flew at low level from Lebanon south over the western Galilee town of Nahariyya, then turned and flew back north, over the Mediterranean sea, having spent up to half an hour in Israeli airspace.

The second flight took place on April 11, 2005, and was a short, 18 mile incursion. The drone had crossed back into Lebanese territory by the time Israeli fighters could be scrambled to intercept.

In 2024, the Mirsad-1 drone was again used by Hezbollah. During the Israel–Hezbollah conflict, the Mirsad-1 drone breached Israeli defenses and targeted an IDF military base in Binyamina-Giv'at Ada, leaving 4 soldiers killed and more than 60 people injured, in what was described as the "biggest attack on Israel since the October 7 massacre".
