= Qods Saeghe =

Iranian target drone

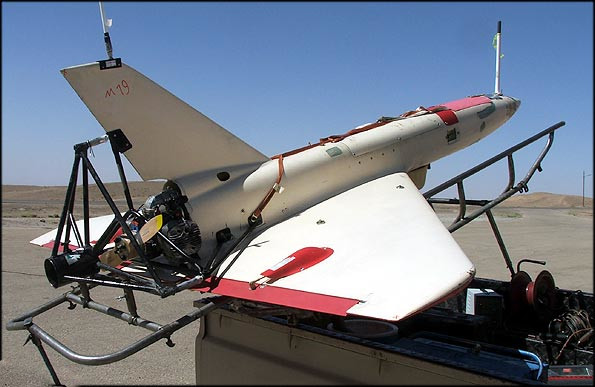
- A Qods Saeghe at an Iranian wargame in 2006.

General information
- Type: Target drone
- National origin: Iran
- Manufacturer: Qods Aviation, Tehran; SSRC, Damascus
- Designer: Qods Aviation
- Status: In service, in production (2013)
- Primary user: Iranian Armed Forces

The Qods Saeghe ("lightning bolt") is a simple Iranian recoverable target drone.

== Design ==
The Saeghe has low-mounted delta wings and a bullet-shaped fuselage. It has a sweptback wing rudder and no landing gear. Control surfaces are located on the horizontal stabilizers. The Saeghe is constructed entirely of composite. It is powered by one 18.6 kW (25 hp) WAE-342 pusher engine in a pusher configuration.

The Saeghe is launched via a small rocket from a short metal rail, called a JATO launch. It is recovered by parachute over land or water (as a plastic drone, it floats) or by skidding on its belly over flat terrain.

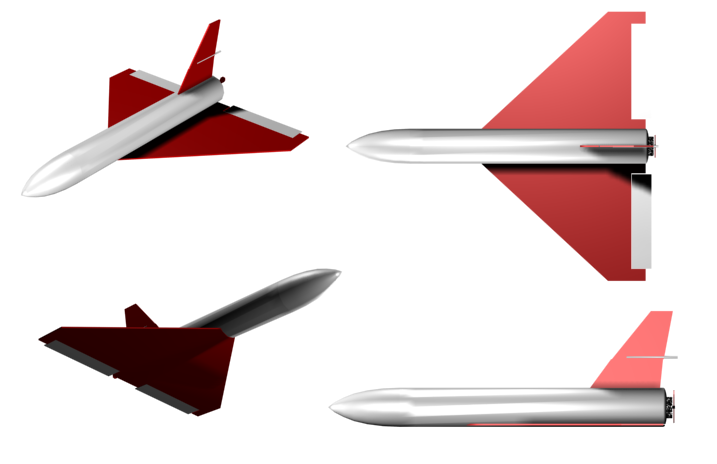
Artist's impression of a Qods Saeghe.

== Variants ==
It comes in two versions. The first one which only has radio command guidance system and the other one which has GPS guidance and IR emissions. Both versions are launched via a booster and are recovered by parachute.

=== Saeghe-1 ===
The Saeghe 1's flight path and maneuvers are controlled by simple radio command. This variant is also known as the N-Q-A 100.

=== Saeghe-2 ===
The Saeghe-2 has more advanced avionics, with tele-command and telemetry uplinks and downlinks between the drone and the ground control station. The Saeghe 2 also has GPS navigation it can use to follow navigational points on autopilot beyond the line-of-sight of the operator. The Saeghe-2 shares the same airframe as the Saeghe-1.

The Saeghe 2 carries a gyrostabilized radar reflector and three IR flares. It is controlled from a ground control station which can be carried in a small van. The Saeghe 2 first flew in 2002.

== Operators ==
=== State operators ===
- Iran
  - Islamic Republic of Iran Armed Forces
- Syria
  - Syrian Armed Forces

== Specifications (Saeghe-2) ==
Data from Jane's

General characteristics

- Length: 2.81 m (9 ft 3 in)
- Wingspan: 2.6 m (8 ft 6 in)
- Height: .7 m (2 ft 4 in)
- Max takeoff weight: 60 kg (132 lb)
- Powerplant: 1 × WAE-342 twin-cylinder piston engine
- Propellers: 2-bladed

Performance

- Maximum speed: 250 km/h (160 mph, 130 kn) in level flight
- Combat range: 50 km (31 mi, 27 nmi)
- Endurance: 45 min
- Service ceiling: 3,355 m (11,007 ft)
