= Qods Aviation Industry Company =

Iranian UAV manufacturer

Qods Aviation
- Industry: Aviation
- Founded: 1985
- Headquarters: Iran
- Products: Saeghe, Talash, and Mohajer UAVs

Qods Aviation Industry Company (also spelled Ghods) is an Iranian state-owned aerospace company established in 1985. It specializes in UAVs.

It was formed under the Islamic Revolutionary Guard Corps (IRGC). In early 1998 it was reorganized under the Aerospace Industries Organization. As of 2011, it had hundreds of employees.

Products and services include:

- Manufacturing drones: Saeghe, Talash, and Mohajer;
- Developing a variety of parachutes (Freefall Personnel Parachutes, Strato Cloud parachutes, Ofogh parachutes, and Fakhte parachutes)
- Manufacturing powered paragliders;
- Manufacturing and design of ground control station (GCS) systems, imagery, targeting, optical tracking and aviation systems.

Qods Aviation is subject to American OFAC sanctions.

== See also ==
- Iran Aviation Industries Organization
- Iranian Military Industry
