= SAGEM Crecerelle =

Type of aircraft

Crecerelle
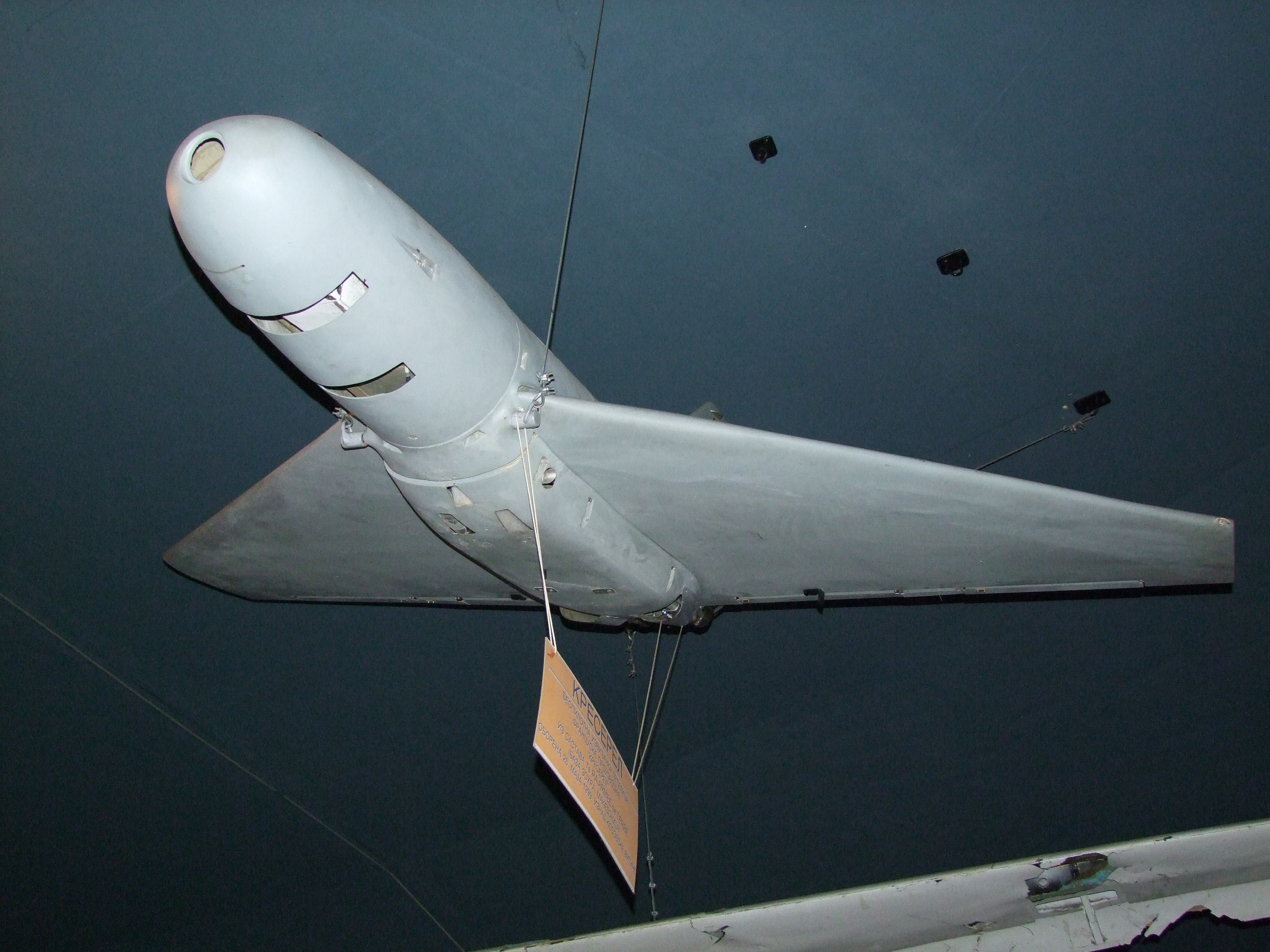
- Sagem Crecerelle

General information
- Type: Reconnaissance UAV
- National origin: France
- Manufacturer: SAGEM

History
- Developed from: Meggitt Banshee

The Sagem Crecerelle ("Kestrel") is a reconnaissance UAV developed in France in the 1990s, based on the Meggitt Banshee target drone. Its configuration is much like that of the Banshee, with a pusher prop, a clipped delta wing, and a single tailfin, though its fuselage is more cylindrical. It is powered by a 20 kW (26 hp) rotary engine and has no landing gear, being recovered by parachute and airbags. The Crecerelle saw action with French forces during the Kosovo campaign in 1999. Meggitt sells much the same machine as the Spectre.

== Operators ==
France

- French Army

== Specifications ==
General characteristics

- Crew: None
- Length: 2.40 m (7 ft 11 in)
- Wingspan: 3.30 m (10 ft 10 in)
- Height: 0.70 m (2 ft 4 in)
- Gross weight: 120 kg (250 lb)
- Powerplant: 1 × WAE 342 , 19 kW (25 hp)

Performance

- Maximum speed: 240 km/h (150 mph, 130 kn)
- Endurance: 5 hours
- Service ceiling: 3,100 m (10,000 ft)
