= Altec MART =

French military reconnaissance UAV

MART

General information
- Type: Reconnaissance UAV
- National origin: France
- Manufacturer: Altec Industries

The Altec MART (for Mini-Avion de Reconnaissance Télépiloté - "Remotely piloted reconnaissance mini-aeroplane") is a reconnaissance UAV developed in France during the 1980s.

The Mark II version served with French forces in the first Gulf War. It has a simple conventional configuration like that of a large RC model. It is catapult-launched, carries an imaging system, and appears to be recovered by parachute.

Altec Industries is now selling an improved version of the MART II, the S-MART. It is slightly heavier, has seven hours endurance, and can carry ELINT and jamming payloads.

== Specifications (MART Mk II) ==
General characteristics

- Crew: None
- Length: 3.20 m (10 ft 7 in)
- Wingspan: 3.40 m (11 ft 2 in)
- Gross weight: 110 kg (240 lb)
- Powerplant: 1 × WAE 342 , 19 kW (25 hp)

Performance

- Maximum speed: 195 km/h (120 mph, 100 kn)
- Endurance: 4 hours
- Service ceiling: 3,100 m (10,000 ft)
