= Hezbollah armed strength =

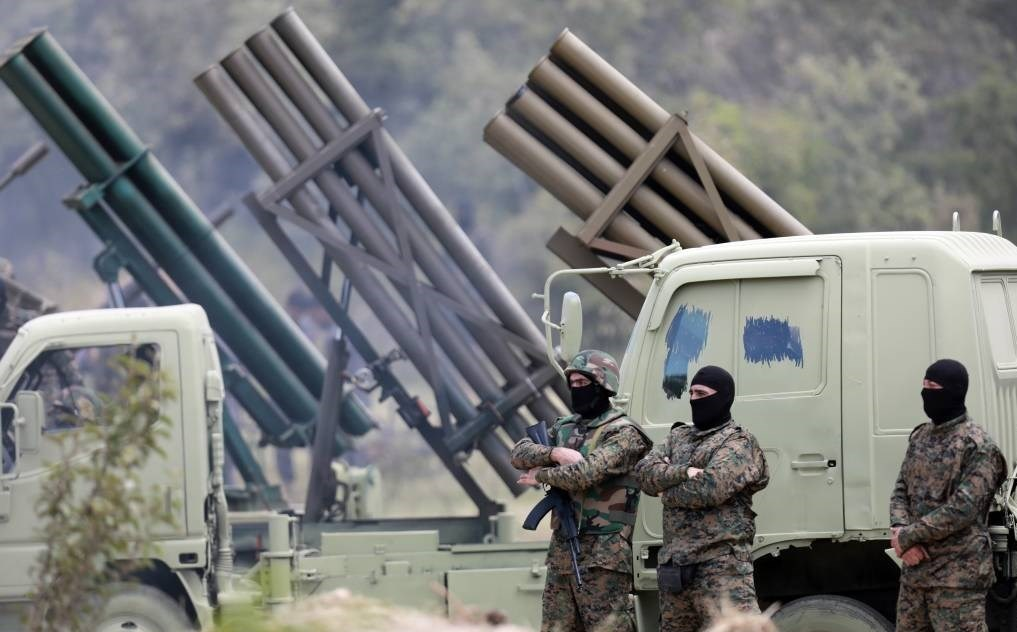
Hezbollah training exercise in Aaramta, Jezzine, southern Lebanon, May 2023

Hezbollah, a Lebanese Shia Islamist political party and militant group, has an exceptionally strong military wing, thought to be stronger than the Lebanese Army and equivalent to the armed strength of a medium-sized army. (Note: One study is more specific, saying that Hezbollah's armaments and intelligence capabilities compare with a medium-sized European state.) A hybrid force, the group maintains "robust conventional and unconventional military capabilities", and is generally considered to be the most powerful non-state actor in the world. (Note: A few sources describe Hezbollah as a Lebanese state actor.)

Estimates vary widely, but as of October 2021, Hezbollah's leader Hassan Nasrallah claimed his organization has 100,000 trained fighters. In 2017, Janes assessed Hezbollah's strength at more than 20,000+ full-time fighters and approximately 20,000+ reservists. (Note: In 2016, the Israeli newspaper Haaretz said that Hezbollah had about 20,000 active regular duty fighters and 25,000 reservists. In 2015, the Center for Strategic and International Studies said that Hezbollah had a low of 5,000 full time fighters and 15,000 reservists. The US State Department wrote that Hezbollah had at least 10,000 active fighters and up to 10,000 reserves. Hezbollah members regularly claim that the party has 50,000-70,000 combatants.) They are financed in part by Iran and trained by Iran's Islamic Revolutionary Guard Corps. Hezbollah's military budget is $700 million according to 2018 U.S. official estimates.

Hezbollah's primary adversary is Israel, and to a large extent its military strength is based on rockets. Hezbollah's strategy against Israel uses rockets as offensive weaponry combined with light infantry and anti-armor units to defend their firing positions in southern Lebanon. Estimates of Hezbollah's total rocket count range from 40,000 to 120,000, which is considerably more than most countries.

Hezbollah possesses limited numbers of anti-aircraft and anti-ship missiles, as well as thousands of anti-tank missiles. The group does not have manned aircraft, tanks, or armored vehicles in Lebanon, as they cannot counter Israeli air supremacy. (Note: Hezbollah did use armored vehicles in the Arsal campaign on the Lebanese border against the HTS and ISIS non-state actors.)

Hezbollah's tactical strengths are cover and concealment, direct fire, and preparation of fighting positions, while their weaknesses include maneuver warfare, small arms marksmanship, and air defenses. Though Hezbollah's light infantry and anti-tank squads are well-regarded, Hezbollah as a whole is "quantitatively and qualitatively" weaker than the IDF.

Sources generally agree that Hezbollah's strength in conventional warfare compares favorably to state militaries in the Arab world. (Note: The Chief of General Staff of the IDF, Benny Gantz, said in 2014 that "Hezbollah is now stronger than any Arab army" although this seems hyperbolic.) A 2009 review concluded that Hezbollah was "a well-trained, well-armed, highly motivated, and highly evolved war-fighting machine" (Note: Others make similar judgements: "what … the United States had dismissed as a ragtag group of terrorists was, in fact, a sophisticated, well-trained, and very well-armed fighting machine") and "the only Arab or Muslim entity to successfully face the Israelis in combat."

Hezbollah typically does not discuss their military operations. (Note: "Ibrahim Mousawi, head of Hezbollah's media relations, said the party doesn't comment on its military policies.") Accurate and reliable information on their strengths and capabilities is often non-existent or classified. Hezbollah, Israel and others may have reasons to misstate the movement's capabilities. Estimates for Hezbollah's overall strength and manpower vary widely. (Note: In 2006, for example, assessments within the IDF of Hezbollah ranged from a "gang" to an "Iranian commando division.")

Hezbollah's military capabilities were significantly diminished during the 2023-2024 conflict with Israel, referred to as the "Support War" or "Gaza Support War" in Arabic. Following a ceasefire in November 2024, Israel persisted with almost daily airstrikes in Lebanon, resulting in the deaths of 331 individuals, including at least 127 civilians, by November 2025. The death toll eventually exceeded 500, and Hezbollah breached the ceasefire by enhancing its military infrastructure and weapons.

Hezbollah used fiber optic drones in the 2026 Lebanon war as part of the Hezbollah–Israel conflict.

== History ==
=== Formation ===
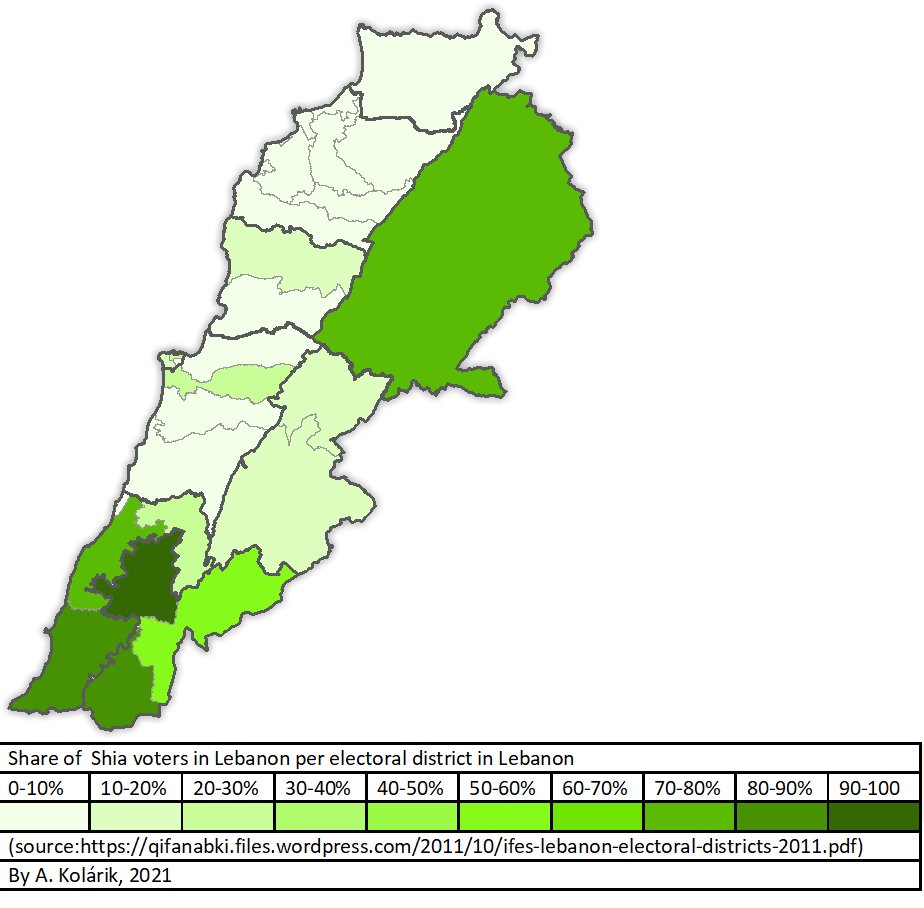
The distribution of the Shia population in Lebanon

The Lebanese Civil War began in 1975. Three years later, the Palestine Liberation Organization occupied much southern Lebanon in an attempt to raise an army and destroy the state of Israel. Israel invaded in 1982 and shattered the PLO, but occupied southern Lebanon and created a Christian proxy militia, the South Lebanon Army (SLA), to hold the territory. A narrow strip of land running the length of the Israeli border was termed the "security zone." Lebanese Shia, driven by a desire to gather forces to fight the Israeli occupation of southern Lebanon, founded Hezbollah (the Party of God) in 1982, with the organization being named and reorganized in 1985.

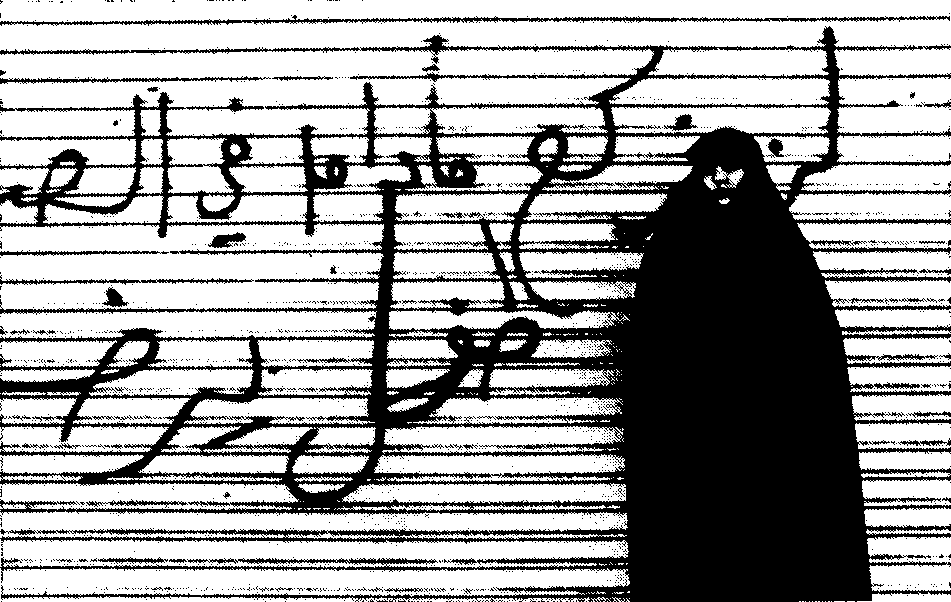
A veiled Shia woman in southern Lebanon beside a Hizballah slogan in the 1980s

In 1982, hundreds of Islamic Revolutionary Guard Corps (IRGC) from Iran traveled to Lebanon's rugged Bekaa Valley and began training various Shiite groups, including Islamic Amal and the Dawa Party. The ongoing civil war and Israel's occupation of southern Lebanon created an environment for resistance against the Israeli forces. "The movement gained momentum quickly due to logistical, financial, and military support from both Syria and Iran" and engaged Israel in guerrilla warfare. The physical geography of southern Lebanon is green and hilly with deep valleys, which favored the defender and was ideal for Hezbollah's "classic" guerrilla warfare.

Hezbollah's initial tactical choices involved human wave attacks, similar to those used by Iran in the Iran–Iraq War in which some Hezbollah elements participated, and terrorist tactics like kidnappings, aircraft hijackings, and mass-casualty suicide attacks to hurt Israel's resolve to fight. (Note: At this time in Lebanon, terrorism was seen as unconventional warfare and a legitimate extension of political struggle.) Hezbollah engaged in short raids to harass and kill and did not try to hold territory. Although initially very successful, these choices imposed a heavy cost on Hezbollah in casualties and in public opinion.

The Central Intelligence Agency (CIA) in 1985 said Hezbollah's command and control was "virtually non-existent" and described Hezbollah as not a hierarchy but defined by personal loyalties, personal rivalries, and family ties. At this time, operational decisions were inefficiently passed through multiple clerics and imams in Beirut, who were far from the front lines. Hezbollah had a military structure and separate responsibility for operations, logistics, communications, intelligence, training and recruitment. This lack of a hierarchy was similar to contemporary left-wing liberation movements.

Tactics around 1985–1986 were mainly planting landmines, detonating IEDs and occasionally gathering bands of armed men to shoot at the Israelis. Hezbollah was not able to use sniping at this time. An IDF intelligence officer described Hezbollah in the mid-1980s as a "rag-tag group" that "failed every time". A 2014 review considers the group's tactical performance during this period poor and "very amateurish." The CIA says that prior to spring 1986, Hezbollah's attacks were more "undisciplined acts of desperation" rather than military actions.

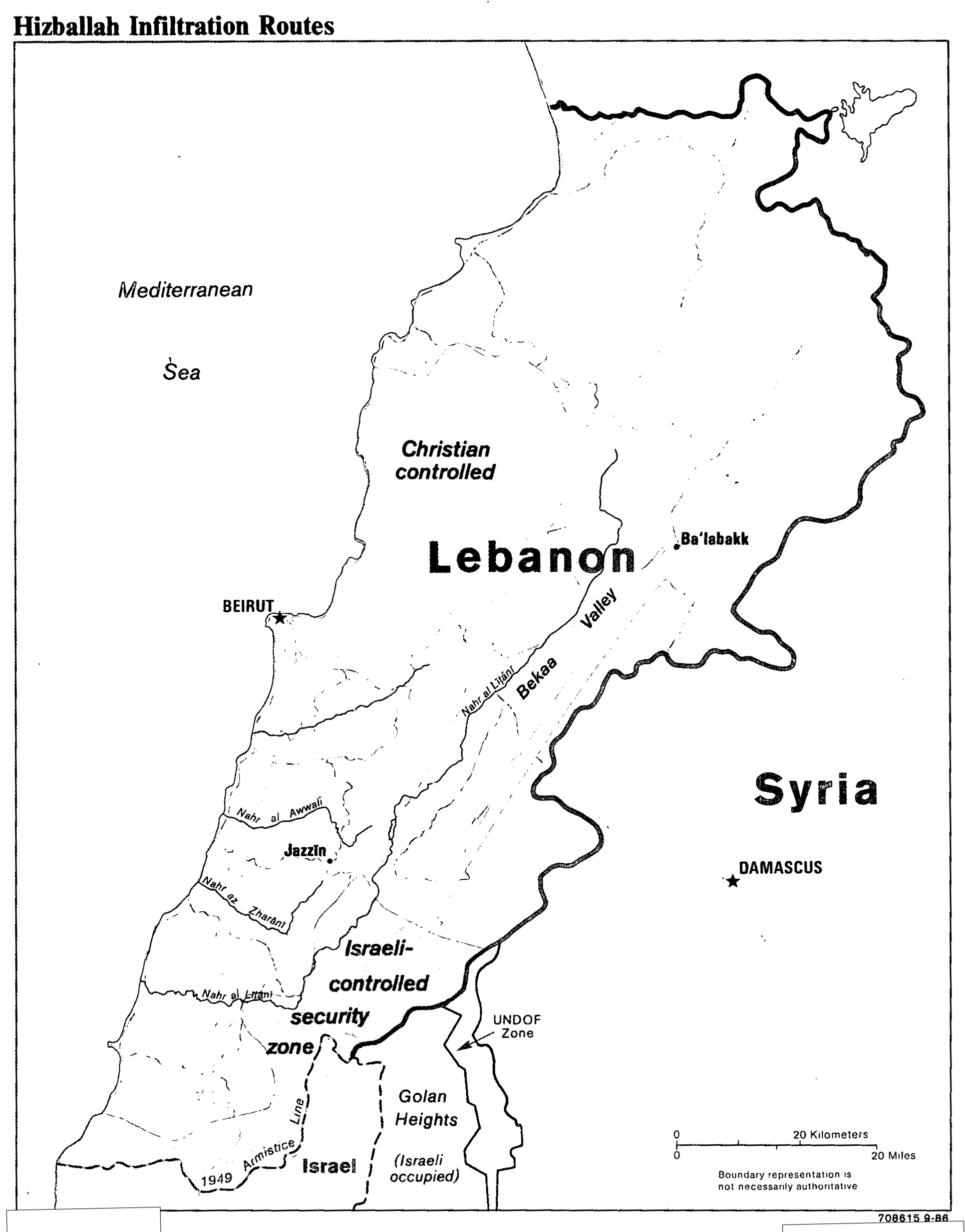
A map of Hezbollah infiltration routes into the security zone

=== Growth ===
Despite these problems, Hezbollah continued to grow in size, and in 1986, the CIA considered its military strength comparable to Lebanon's major militias. The total membership of Hezbollah and closely affiliated groups grew from "several hundred" in 1983 to 2,000–3,000 in 1984 and to a few thousand in 1985. In mid-1986, Hezbollah massed 5,000 fighters for an event in the town of Baalbek in the Bekaa Valley. Hezbollah was numerically smaller than Amal in 1986, but trends were favoring Hezbollah.

At this time, Hezbollah had many part-time fighters and very few full-time members, making it sensitive to casualties. Hezbollah's "skill in fighting the Israeli Army and Israel's proxy militia forces", as well as the corruption and inefficiency of Hezbollah's rival Amal, were critical in building credibility and public support. In south Lebanon, Amal was widely seen as "too moderate" and accommodating of Israel, leading many Shia to back Hezbollah.

Hezbollah also received backing from pro-Hezbollah factions of Amal that had split from top Amal leadership. Assessments of Hezbollah's position at this time vary. The CIA assessed at the time that "Hezbollah’s policy of confronting Israel and its surrogates is working" and that Hezbollah held a "qualitative edge" in warfare over the SLA and Amal, while an independent review says that by 1987 Hezbollah's strategic position was deteriorating.

On April 18, 1987, a Hezbollah human wave attack on a fortified SLA outpost failed and resulted in 24 dead, killing around 5% of Hezbollah's full-time fighters in a single day. As a consequence of this setback and others like it, Hezbollah was forced to change its strategy. Outgunned by the Israelis and outspent by richer Lebanese sects and political parties, Hezbollah was forced to learn fast and reappraise its tactics, strategy, and organization.

Suicide attacks gave way to "sophisticated, coordinated, and timed attacks" and short, quick ambushes. In May 1987, Hezbollah began to coordinate infantry and artillery as combined arms, and "improved their capability to attack Israeli helicopters, and demonstrated improvements in extracting wounded from the battlefield." Hezbollah moved from squad-sized attacks around 1986 to platoon- and company-sized attacks by spring 1987, and launched a simultaneous attack on multiple targets in September 1987.

Hezbollah's attacks in the late 1980s became better planned and developed in complexity, especially in involving supporting fire. Hezbollah removed most mid-level commanders in the late 1980s, delegating their authority to local commanders, which improved both operational performance and security. Hezbollah trimmed its ranks of loosely affiliated reservists and switched its tactics to IEDs, ambushes, and indirect fire. Originally, Hezbollah was just one of several militias fighting the Israelis, but by 1985 it was preeminent. By the late 1980s, it was clearly dominant. (Note: Other factions fighting the Israelis were Amal, the Syrian Social Nationalist Party, the Lebanese Communist Party, the CAO, the Lebanese Baath Party, and various Palestinian factions.)

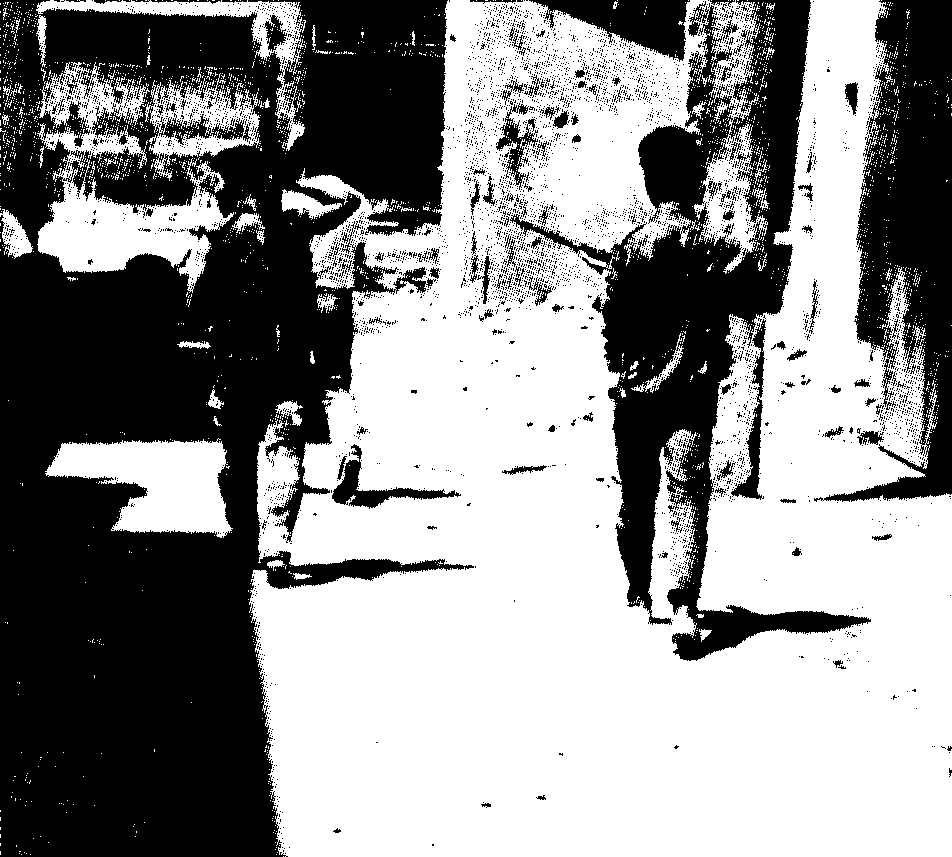
Armed Hezbollah fighters patrol a neighborhood in southern Beirut, 1985

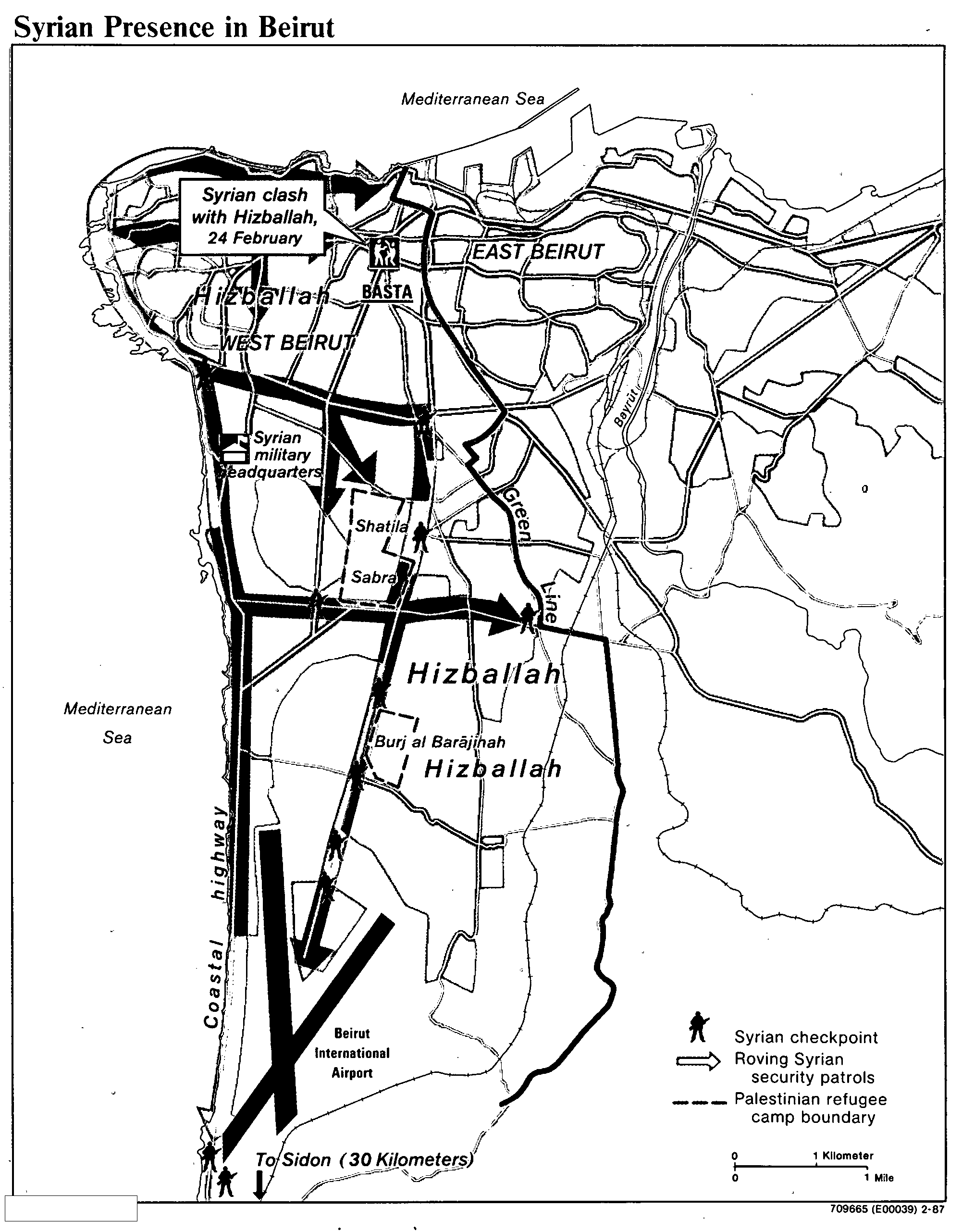
Map of Hezbollah and Syrian control of Beirut, 1987

In May 1988, after years of rivalry and clashes, Hezbollah waged a brief but intense war with Amal for control of Beirut's southern suburbs, which at the time contained about one-quarter of Lebanon's population. As Amal was allied with Syria, Hezbollah clashed with the Syrian Army troops occupying Lebanon at that time. Hezbollah won in the streetfighting and escalated to targeted assassinations and encouraging defections, forcing Amal to seek Syrian mediation. Amal and Hezbollah have remained begrudging allies ever since.

After Hezbollah prevailed militarily, they soon imposed harsh Sharia law on their territory, such as banning coffee and unveiled women, and lost the hearts and minds of their people. Most Lebanese are not Shiite, and even most of Lebanon's Shiites do not want to live in an Islamic state. Support for Hezbollah is much higher than support for hardline Shiite religious rule.

Faced with declining public support and collapsing tourism, Hezbollah was forced to abandon its rhetoric of an Islamic republic and entered Lebanese politics in 1992. Later efforts by Hezbollah to create social institutions, rebuild homes destroyed by the fighting, and bring sewage, jobs, and electricity to Shiite areas were critical for building public support. In 1989, the Taif Accord ended the Lebanese Civil War, and allowed Hezbollah to intensify its military efforts against the IDF.

=== 1990s ===
Hezbollah improved rapidly in the early 1990s, progressing from losing five fighters for every Israeli soldier killed in 1990, to 1.5 in 1993, a ratio that roughly held till the end of the decade. Hezbollah ended human-wave attacks in 1990 and began conducting attacks with two units: an assault team and a fire support team with 81 mm mortars. Accumulating combat experience was critical to this improvement in tactical proficiency. By the early 1990s, Hezbollah attacks were "characterized by careful planning and well-practiced professionalism."

Hezbollah in the early 1990s performed dedicated staff work, mirroring their Israeli adversaries. Improved intelligence and reconnaissance abilities were also major drivers of better overall fighting ability. In 1992, Hassan Nasrallah took control of Hezbollah, and he is generally considered to have provided strong leadership. During the late 1980s and early 1990s, Hezbollah refocused on quality over quantity, substantially improved training, and accumulated more weapons: by the early 1990s, they "had amassed a significant arsenal." Their small arms at this time included AK-47 and M16 rifles, Bangalore torpedoes, hand grenades, RPGs, and M40 recoilless rifles. Iran was largely responsible for this arms increase, and flew planeloads of weapons and ammo into Damascus every month. Hezbollah introduced full combat uniforms in the early 1990s and improved their small-unit tactics and field security.

Throughout the 1990s, Hezbollah waged a cat-and-mouse of IEDs with the IDF, with Hezbollah developing increasingly sophisticated IEDs and the IDF countermeasures. Hezbollah may have used cell phone-detonated IEDs against the IDF as early as 1995. IEDs were the main source of Israeli casualties during the occupation period. IED attacks increased about 50% each year from 1995 until 2000. On September 29, 1992, Hezbollah launched its first coordinated attack on multiple outposts.

In 1993, Hezbollah engaged in a seven day period of intensified fighting with Israel, which resulted in enormous damage to Lebanese infrastructure and civilians but little lasting military harm to either Hezbollah or Israel. The conflict saw the first major use of unguided Katyusha rockets fired onto IDF occupied Israeli areas by Hezbollah, a tactic used by the PLO a decade before and became a defining practice of Hezbollah in the future. Hezbollah used its first AT-3 Sagger anti-tank guided missile (ATGM) in September 1992 and used its first AT-4 Spigot missiles in 1997, the same year, Hezbollah acquired the powerful American TOW ATGM. The anti-tank weaponry used by Hezbollah steadily increased in quality over the duration of the insurgency. By 1998, Hezbollah had destroyed three Merkava Mk 3 main battle tanks with these missiles.

Hezbollah started seriously developing anti-tank tactics in 1997, with a focus on being able to hit the same spot on a tank multiple times to defeat Israel's sophisticated reactive armor, a tactic that remains a part of Hezbollah's repertoire today. Although Hezbollah's ATGM weaponry at the time – and still today – remains far inferior to the IDF's Spike system, being able to destroy Merkava tanks was a psychological victory. Hezbollah improved in their ability to use mortars and artillery during this time.

Not all of Hezbollah's weapons were as successful. Although Hezbollah acquired SA-7 'Grail' anti-aircraft missiles and first fired them in November 1991, they had almost no success attacking Israeli aircraft. Hezbollah's anti-aircraft abilities remain one of the group's largest weaknesses. Hezbollah fighters used "basic light infantry tactics" during this period, like IEDs, mortars, and small ambushes.

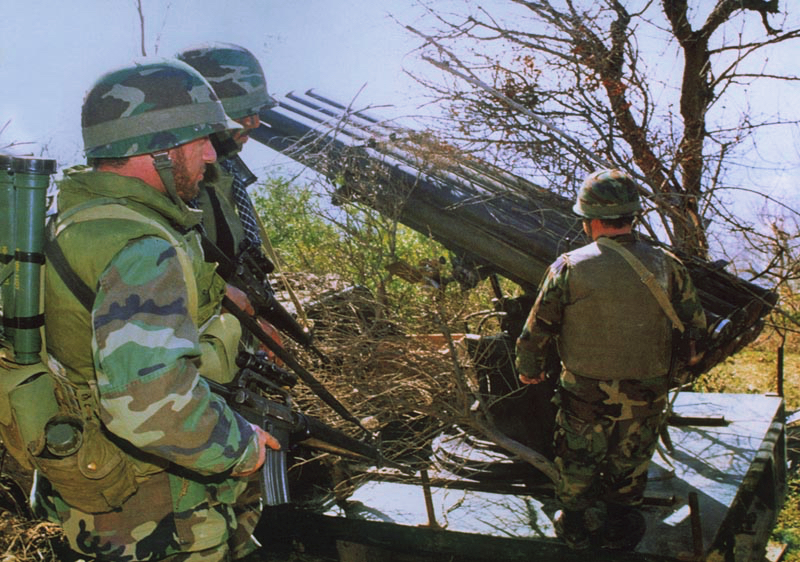
Hezbollah fighters with M16 rifles fire a BM-21 Grad "Katyusha" rocket launcher during the 1996 "April War."

Around 1995, a small group of fighters went to Bosnia to train Muslims in the civil war. This was probably Hezbollah's first expeditionary endeavor. Hezbollah continued to find suicide attacks morally acceptable, but phased their usage out because they were no longer tactically effective. Hezbollah launched just four suicide attacks in the 1990s. This is part of Hezbollah's long-term trend towards non-terrorism forms of violence.

During the 1990s, Hezbollah particularly targeted Shiite conscripts in the SLA for defections, desertion, or intelligence. Along with Hezbollah's use of PSYOPS and propaganda warfare, this led to plummeting morale within the SLA. SLA morale, and even IDF morale, declined as the insurgency went on. Although the insurgency had sometimes seemed "tepid" in the early 1990s, the 1996 Operation Grapes of Wrath greatly increased the level of violence.

Hezbollah and Israel engaged in a sixteen-day campaign marked by thousands of rocket and artillery strikes and intensified fighting. Hezbollah launched hundreds of rockets into Israel during the conflict, and their "rocket performance [had] improved particularly between 1993 and 1996." The campaign ended with the written April Understanding, which established well-understood "rules of the game" and allowed retaliation if either side crossed "red lines," particularly attacks on civilians. Since then, Hezbollah has followed typical strategic doctrine of escalation and deterrence.

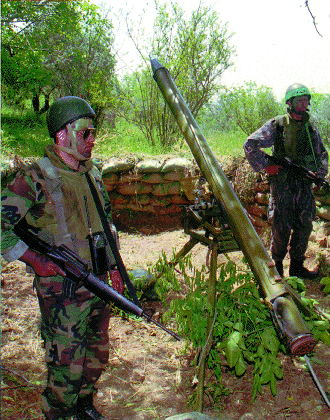
Hezbollah guerrillas stand by a Katyusha rocket, 1998

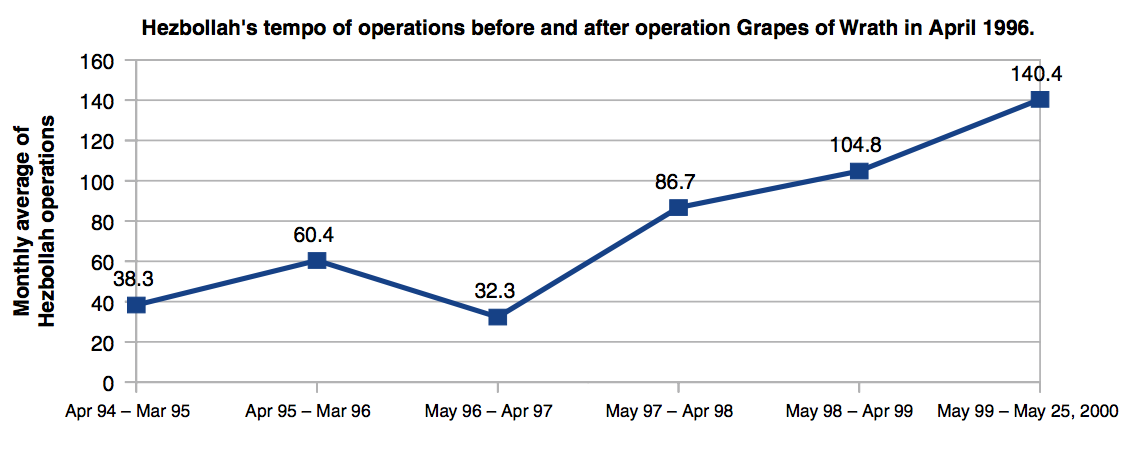
The number of Hezbollah attacks increased substantially through the 1990s.

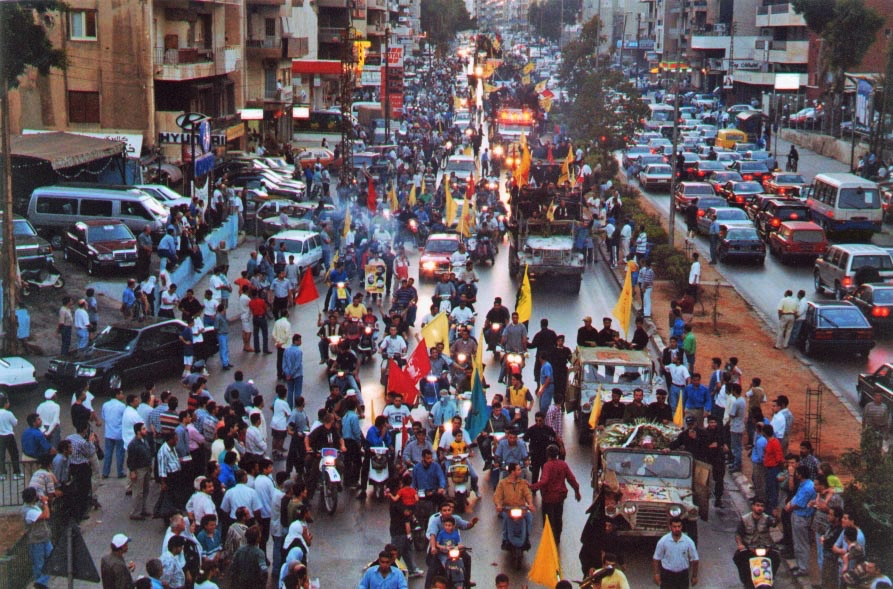
A Hezbollah parade following the end of Israeli occupation, May 2000

Fighting briefly lulled after the 1996 conflict as Hezbollah recovered from the fighting, but Hezbollah's logistics were "resilient," and Hezbollah dramatically escalated the level of violence thereafter. Hezbollah performed 100 attacks from 1985 to 1989 and 1,030 attacks in the six-year period from 1990 to 1995. It launched 4,928 attacks from 1996 to 2000, including at least 50 attacks per month for three years and over 1,500 attacks in 1999 alone. (Note: These numbers are self-reported by Hezbollah.)

After abandoning the tactic of frontal assaults on SLA and IDF outposts around 1987, Hezbollah resumed the practice a decade later with radically changed tactics. On 18 September 1997, Hezbollah attacked 25 outposts simultaneously and used ATGM teams to target reinforcements. By the end of the occupation, Hezbollah was using heavy weapons and engaging in hours-long firefights with the enemy. In October 1998, Hezbollah first deployed an explosively formed penetrator, a sophisticated and powerful IED that can penetrate almost any armor.

Hezbollah considers 1998, 1999, and 2000 to be their most successful years of insurgency. In 1997 and 1998 combined Israeli and SLA casualties exceeded those of Hezbollah. A research paper by analyst Iver Gabrielson argues that by the late 1990s, Hezbollah had become a "tactically proficient" organization. By identifying and targeting Israel's weak point, casualties, Hezbollah was able to win a war of attrition. Amid escalating violence, poor morale, and intense political pressure at home, the war in Lebanon became too much for Israel. On May 24, 2000, the IDF departed southern Lebanon for the first time in 18 years, and the SLA militia immediately collapsed. Although Hassan Nasrallah had once promised to "slaughter" SLA members in their beds, there were no revenge killings.

=== 2000s ===
From 2000 to 2006, Hezbollah made a strategic choice to build a massive amount of military infrastructure in southern Lebanon, south of the Litani river. Hezbollah enormously increased the quantity and quality of their weaponry, acquiring anti-tank missiles like the AT-14 Kornet. Starting just before the Israeli withdrawal, Hezbollah built a significant military infrastructure in southern Lebanon. (Note: But some sources say infrastructure construction in the south began as early as 1996.) The IDF and independent observers knew that Hezbollah had built some infrastructure, but the scale was unanticipated.

The interwar period was marked by limited, sporadic fighting and few casualties on either side: between 2001 and 2004, Hezbollah launched just 16 attacks. Hezbollah continued to study Israel and adopt to lessons learned, and the group spent a large amount of effort gathering information about Israel. Changing its strategy of high mobility, Hezbollah instead became relatively fixed with pre-built bunkers, stockpiles, and fighting positions. During this time, Hezbollah acquired its first UAVs from Iran and sent militants to Iraq to train "Special Groups" to wage guerrilla warfare against the Americans.

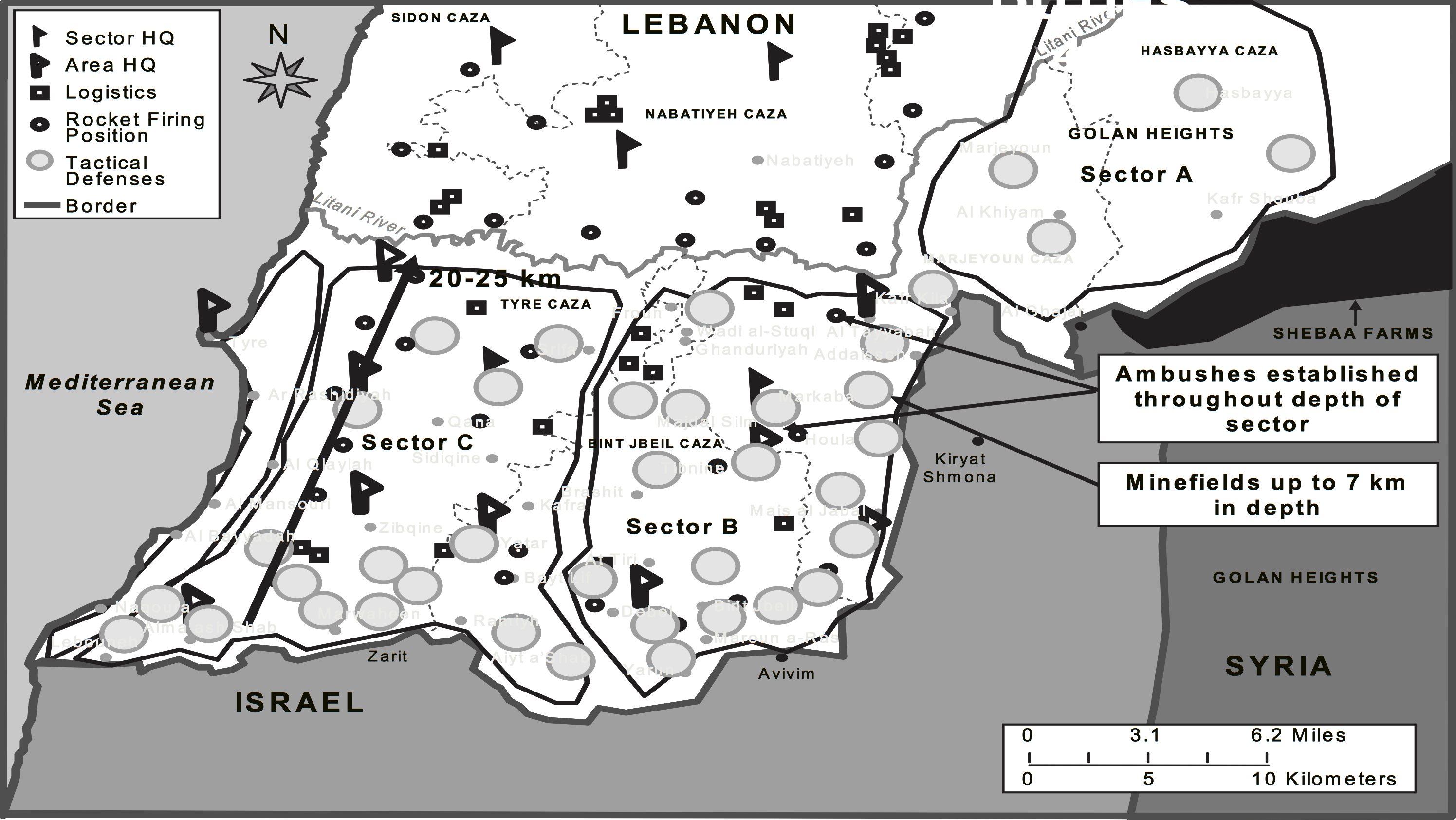
A map of Hezbollah's defensive system in southern Lebanon

In 2006, Hezbollah ambushed an Israeli border patrol inside Israel, killing eight Israeli soldiers and taking prisoner two Israeli soldiers in an unsuccessful attempt to bargain for the release of incarcerated Hezbollah hostages. Israel responded with overwhelming force, sparking the 34-day 2006 Lebanon War. During the course of the war, Hezbollah was described as "an organized, well-trained and well-equipped force" and "fighting hard." In 2006 Hezbollah pursued an asymmetric, integrated standoff fires and area-denial strategy. Hezbollah launched rockets onto populated Israeli areas and cities while using light infantry, bunkers, and anti-tank teams to defend southern Lebanon and attack the IDF. Hezbollah focused on small self-sufficient units, based in villages, providing home-front attrition with a somewhat effective command-and-control structure and low mobility.

In 2006, Hezbollah used a "Complex Web Defense." "This was characterized by mutually supporting defensive positions, interconnected with resilient, redundant communications, and sustained by stockpiled and hidden supplies. Fighters were often irregulars, but were well trained and very well equipped with top-of-the-line antitank and antipersonnel weapons. They were capable of executing flexible, prearranged plans and demonstrated agility at the lower tactical levels."

Hezbollah was willing to fight from villages and other civilian areas, which while a violation of the laws of war, was tactically advantageous. The terrain and climate negated Israel's advantages in armored and maneuver warfare and tested infantry skills, where Hezbollah was strongest. Hezbollah's tactics, including light infantry, anti-tank weapons, and rocket fire onto Israel, were continuations of 1990s-era tactics.

Hezbollah had become more conventional, transitioning from a guerrilla organization into a hybrid actor with the ability to absorb damage and sustain high-intensity fighting over time. The war ended by United Nations Security Council Resolution 1701 and an inconclusive outcome. Neither side achieved their objectives. Hezbollah claimed a "divine victory". Hezbollah identified their main shortcoming in the 2006 war as their lack of air defenses, which they considered a "serious problem" and their main task to address. Other identified weaknesses were marksmanship, small unit tactics, and the exposure of battlefield tactics, weapons depots, and fighting positions.

The UN Security Council resolution that ended the war forced Hezbollah to abandon its dense network of underground bunkers and fortifications and cede southern Lebanon to the Lebanese Armed Forces UN peacekeepers, known as UNIFIL. Although Hezbollah's weaponry, operational security, and intelligence improved much between 2000 and 2006, there was arguably little improvement in Hezbollah's force structure or tactical ability. There is no academic consensus on whether the war was strategically beneficial for Hezbollah. Hezbollah's popularity in the Shia community, Lebanon as a whole, and the Middle East surged following the war.

=== Post-2006 ===
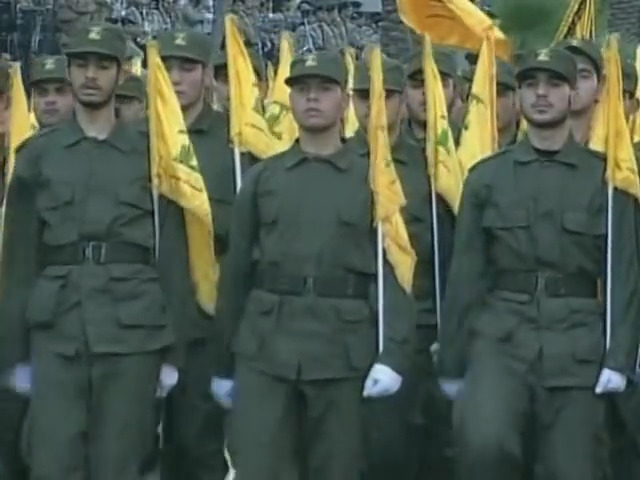
Hezbollah fighters on parade after the 2006 war

Following the 2006 war, Hezbollah undertook an after action review of their weaponry and tactics. Hezbollah rated the performance of their bunkers and camouflaged firing positions in fenced off "security pockets" in rural areas as worthwhile. Hezbollah's review found that the group's "village guard" reservists, almost entirely veterans from the insurgency, had performed well. Hezbollah fighters reportedly knew their local terrain intimately, understood their mission, and had absolute confidence in victory. The Islamic Revolutionary Guard Corps' Quds Force (IRGC-QF) also wrote a lessons-learned review for Hezbollah, who reportedly adopted a number of its recommendations. (Note: Or perhaps the IRGC-QF and Hezbollah together wrote one review; sources dither.) Following the war, the IRGC-QF increased transfers of materiel, funding, training, and intelligence sharing. There has been virtually no rocket fire onto northern Israel following the war, and Hezbollah disavows the few attacks that do happen.

Since the 2006 war, Hezbollah has continued to substantially grow its weapons arsenal, manpower, and intelligence appatus. Hezbollah is widely used as the textbook definition of a hybrid actor, with conventional and unconventional warfare capabilities. As a hybrid actor, Hezbollah's main weakness is its need to maintain civilian support to hide among the population, while causing great harm to civilians if war breaks out. This causes Hezbollah to have to justify its actions to maintain public support and to avoid war.

=== Syrian Civil War ===
Since 2012, Hezbollah has engaged in a military deployment to Syria to fight for the Assad government in the ongoing civil war. In terms of both casualties and total manpower, this is Hezbollah's largest ever military operation. Hezbollah's involvement in Syria may weaken the group somewhat in the short term, but strengthen the group in the long term. Hezbollah relies on Assad for weaponry and as a conduit for arms, and would be threatened by the presence of Sunni militant groups on the Lebanese border.

Weeks after the first protests in early 2011, Hezbollah declared their support for Assad's government in Syria. Since Hezbollah uses the country's capable air defense networks to shield their logistics train, Hezbollah operatives were present even before protests turned violent. The group became involved militarily in 2012 as the government's position slipped and revealed their presence in 2013. For the first two years of the war, Hezbollah presence was limited to a covert advisory role, training, and security for important installations. The group operates largely, but not entirely, in an advisory capacity, training and providing some capabilities like IEDs, guerrilla warfare, and sniping. The group's military role gradually expanded as the government's position deteriorated. Following the 2006 war, Hezbollah engaged in its largest manpower buildup.

Hezbollah has probably deployed up to 4,000 fighters to Syria at any given time. Estimates vary widely, from about 1,500-8,000, but sources agree this represents a meaningful component of Hezbollah's total manpower. Hezbollah uses short deployments in Syria, around a few weeks to a month. Although Hezbollah has deployed line infantry on several occasions, most of their involvement is as front-line advisors providing specialized military assistance like communications support, sniper fire, and special forces. The scope of Hezbollah's involvement in Syria, their largest ever military engagement, is such that they send not just fighters to the country but also support personnel and trainers.

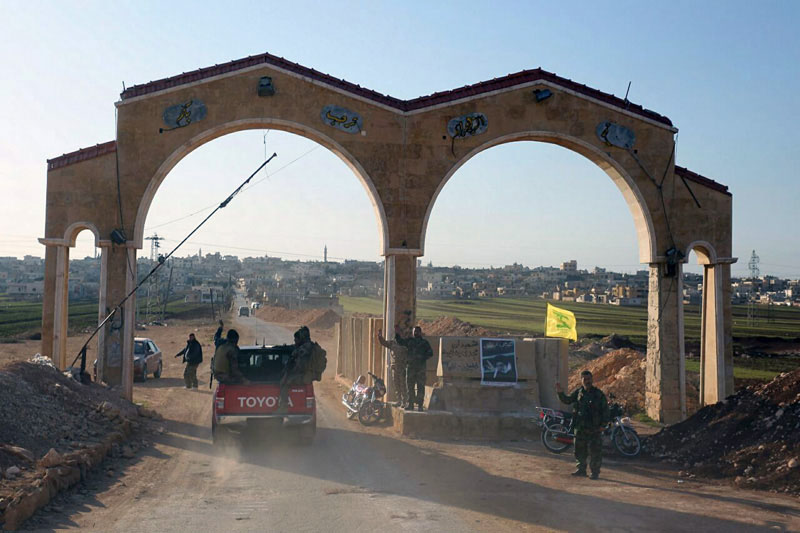
A Hezbollah flag flying at a checkpoint in Syria near the towns of Nubl and Al-Zahra

In Syria, Hezbollah conducts offensive and counter-insurgency operations, and fights side-by-side with Russian soldiers, including Spetsnaz. Although some sources suggest that Russia and Hezbollah are cooperating closely, other sources say they have strategic differences and are not cooperating closely. The party's exposure to sophisticated Russian doctrine, EW capability, airpower, and combined arms could improve the party's capabilities, but also deter it by demonstrating the power of Israel.

Hezbollah has specifically improved its command and control, working with other military organizations, and fighting in dense urban environments. The organization has improved its ability to operate with other Iranian-aligned forces and bettered its ability to conduct sustained operations outside of Lebanon in varied terrain. Hezbollah, which prepared for decades to fight Israel in southern Lebanon, instead had to fight militia forces as a large conventional force in unfamiliar terrain and in farmland and urban areas.

Many sources note that the enemies Hezbollah faces in Syria are very dissimilar to the IDF, and that some of the equipment and knowledge Hezbollah gains will not be usable against Israel. Participation in the war is said to have given Hezbollah a better understanding of conventional armed forces, airpower, and intelligence gathering. The war is Hezbollah's first offensive battlefield experience and the first time Hezbollah has coordinated hundreds of its own fighters.

In 2013, Hezbollah planned and led the battle of al-Qusayr, which was considered an important victory for the government. The group by this point had a significant role in Syria and their performance in this battle is considered good. Later, the group would take heavier than expected casualties leading the Battle of Aleppo, and Iran reportedly replaced it with the Badr Organization. Despite this, Hezbollah remains the most capable and trusted Iranian-aligned group in Syria, and generally maintains control of most Shiite militias in Syria and Afghan and Pakistani foreign fighters. At the same time, some Hezbollah members see the war effort as mercenary work. When the group fights in Syria, they often take a command role, with the Syrian Army handling logistics and local intelligence. In 2017, Hezbollah paratroopers apparently jumped into the besieged garrison of Fu'ah and Kafriya.

The war made Hezbollah much more independent from Syria: while Hezbollah was once a Syrian proxy, it now has its own areas of influence inside Syria. The group's position within Iranian-allied forces has been strengthened over the course of the war. Since Hezbollah intervened in Syria, it has taken on a conventional war and received heavy weaponry from the Assad government. Hezbollah has deployed about 4,000 to 8,000 fighters in Syria.

Although the group has suffered heavily from the war, with over two thousand deaths, the war has served as a powerful recruiting drive among Shia youth and has resulted in the preservation, to date, of the Assad government. According to former Shin Bet chief Avi Dichter, Hezbollah's combat experience in Syria "has made [them] a better fighting force and more adept in conventional military warfare." Although Hezbollah's intervention in Syria has "strengthened and battle-hardened" the group, it has also redirected resources away from Israel and reduced the group's standing among Lebanese Sunnis. The party's involvement in Syria may threaten its war readiness, although the party maintains strong support among Lebanese shias. A lack of established norms in Syria makes the party's relationship there with Israel more volatile.

Hezbollah fighters are substantially better than soldiers from the Syrian Arab Army, with one rebel commander describing Hezbollah as "the number one [government] fighters in Syria." Newsweek writes that Hezbollah as a whole is stronger than the Syrian government. A report from the Institute for the Study of War finds that Hezbollah soldiers are "often far better trained, disciplined, and experienced than their Syrian or Iraqi counterparts" and have substantially better morale.

Hezbollah is considered more capable than the Syrian Arab Army, which has been plagued by defections and poor discipline. Their fighters are noted to stop SAA soldiers from looting and pillaging. Hezbollah arguably is playing for long-term influence in Syria. Fighters sometimes openly disrespect Syrian Army soldiers and rarely fly Syrian flags or pictures of Bashar al-Assad.

Since the start of the civil war in Syria in 2011, Hezbollah has deployed a substantial amount of its manpower in the country, where Hezbollah engages in counterinsurgency and large scale operations. Most sources agree that this deployment has harmed Hezbollah's morale and public image, while improving Hezbollah's ability to conduct large-scale maneuvers and interoperability with allied forces. As of 2017, Hezbollah's military operations include thousands of fighters deployed to Syria to back the Assad government, about 250-500 fighters in Iraq training the Shiite-dominated Popular Mobilization Forces, and about 50 fighters in Yemen on a covert train-and-support mission for Houthi rebels.

Over the course of 35 years, Hezbollah evolved from "a relatively small group of revolution-oriented conspirators" into "arguably the most powerful and popular organization in Lebanon." Hezbollah changed from "a small cadre of militants" into a semi-military organization and a regional military actor. Professor Augustus Richard Norton says that the core reasons for Hezbollah's long-term success were its resistance to Israeli occupation, institution-building, anti-western worldview, piety, pragmatism, and Iranian support. Scholar Iver Gabrielson says the main reasons for Hezbollah's victory were its "pragmatism, social services and political participation." Andrew Exum says that Hezbollah won by combining kinetic (violent) and non-kinetic lines of operation. Over its history, Hezbollah has performed many different kinds of warfare, including insurgency, sub-state conflict, hybrid warfare, and counter-insurgency.

Qualitatively, Hezbollah is described as ruthless and arrogant, willing to use physical force to effect political change, and prioritizing hard power. Hezbollah's strategy combines extremist rhetoric, tactical caution, and long-term risk taking. Arguably, its core source of strength is its effective, sustained violence. A number of sources say that Hezbollah's fighting strength is the foundation upon which its political power, public support, and legitimacy lie. As one Hezbollah fighter said in 2017, "Either you are strong or you are weak, and if you are weak you get eaten. Now, Hezbollah is strong."

=== Hezbollah–Israel conflict (2023–present) ===
Hezbollah's capabilities were severely weakened during the Hezbollah-Israel conflict (2023-2024), also known as the "Support War" or the "Gaza Support War" in Arabic. Despite a ceasefire agreement reached in November 2024, Israel continued to launch airstrikes in Lebanon almost every day, killing 331 people (at least 127 of whom were civilians) by November 2025. Later, the death toll surpassed 500. Hezbollah violated the cease-fire by strengthening its military infrastructure and armaments.

== Training ==
In general, Hezbollah runs most of their own training camps, with Iran's Islamic Revolutionary Guard Corps, particularly the Quds Force, playing an integral role. The IRGC runs training camps in Lebanon. Hezbollah fighters have traveled to Iran for more advanced training. Hezbollah also runs many of its own camps, particularly for introductory training. Assessments of how much of Hezbollah's training takes place in Iran vary, but probably most training takes place in Lebanon. Hezbollah is widely reported to send members to Iran for more advanced training than can be delivered in Lebanon, but estimates of how many Hezbollah supporters have been to Iran for military training vary wildly, ranging from "hundreds" since 2006 to hundreds of thousands. In general, there is no expert consensus on the degree of IRGC involvement in arming and training Hezbollah.

In terms of design, Hezbollah training camps are structured and inspired by Israeli training camps, which Hezbollah studies. Training camps are located in remote parts of Lebanon under Hezbollah control, and are protected by checkpoints staffed with uniformed guards. Facilities generally include firing ranges, assault courses and urban warfare sites, and sometimes driving tracks and IED ranges. The largest camp, located in the west Beqaa Valley, contains a mock-up Lebanese village and a main street. All members, including administrative clerics, have to graduate from a 45-day paramilitary course. This is hosted in Lebanon and teaches basic fighting skills. Full-time combatants eventually specialize in a field like explosives or ATGMs.

Training includes long marches, weapons familiarity, reconnaissance and observation, and navigation skills. Fighters are reportedly well-trained in pre-sighting mortars, indirect fire, and using ATGMs, particularly TOW missiles, AT-3 Saggers, and Kornets. Fighters are known to be transported to training camps in blacked-out vans and have little knowledge of the identities of their instructors or comrades. Hezbollah's capabilities for sniping and light infantry are well-regarded, with members "highly skilled at reconnaissance and intelligence gathering in the field."

Hezbollah snipers are often described as well-trained and "avoid conversations, behave arrogantly towards others, dress well and hate small talk." They are often college educated with studies in mathematics and are apparently required to take classes in a foreign language and creative writing. Hezbollah snipers later trained an Afghan Shiite sniper unit. Hezbollah is trained with American and Israeli military manuals that emphasize tactics of attrition, mobility, intelligence gathering and night-time maneuvering.

Sources describe Hezbollah in peacetime as "careful, patient, [and] attuned to gathering intelligence" who perform staff work and long-term planning. Hezbollah's active duty fighters are regularly described as well-trained and disciplined.

Hezbollah has passed on its "knowledge of military tactics and recruitment techniques" since the 1980s to a wide range of other organizations. Hezbollah has mostly trained fellow Shiite groups, such as Shia militias in Iraq, during and after the American occupation, and has reportedly trained Houthis, Syrians, and Iraqis in Lebanon and elsewhere. Iran's IRGC-QF likes working with Hezbollah because they are Arabic-speakers and provide a degree of separation to Iran. Hezbollah's training of Iraqi militants focused particularly on small arms, reconnaissance, small unit tactics, and communications, with a focus on effecting IED attacks, EFP usage, and kidnappings. Training included intelligence and sniper skills.

To a more limited degree, Hezbollah has trained a wide range of general Islamic radicals, including fundamentalists in Tunisia, Algeria, Egypt, the Palestinian Territories, and the Gulfs states. There are questionable reports that Hezbollah has trained small numbers of Lebanese Army personnel as well. The party's training is well-regarded. In 2017, A Hezbollah commander claimed that 120,000 fighters had passed through Hezbollah's training camps. Estimates of Hezbollah's manpower vary widely. For example, in 2002 the US State Department said that Hezbollah had a few hundred operatives and a few thousand supporters.

=== History ===
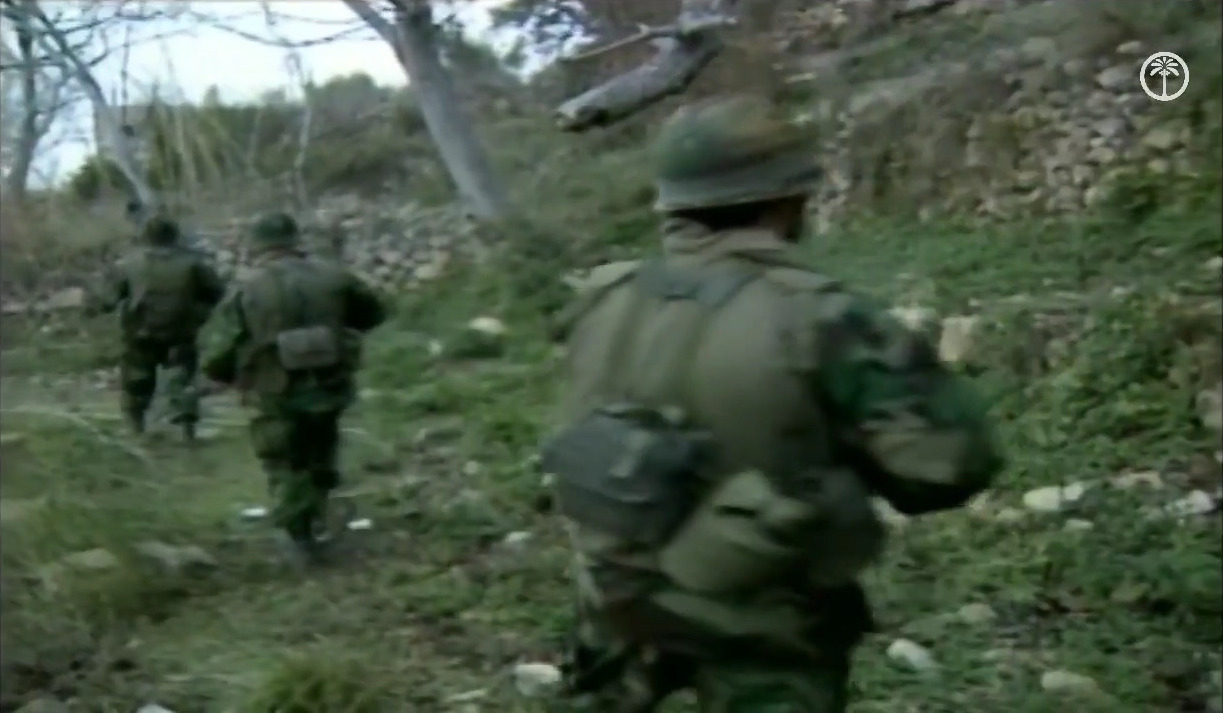
Hezbollah members on a march

In 1984, training was centered in the Sheikh Abdullah Barracks in Lebanon, with fighters sleeping in the barracks at night and leaving during the day in fear of air raids. Following Israeli air raids on their training camps in the Bekaa valley in 1994, Hezbollah trained more furtively in the Bekaa Valley, with small tents and foxholes. The end of the 2006 war brought large manpower demands that required Hezbollah to expand its training facilities. Since then, Hezbollah has had fairly large and built-up training camps.

In the early 1980s, some Hezbollah fighters travelled to Iran and fought against the Iraqi Army in the Iran–Iraq War. In the 1990s, the IRGC trained Hezbollah in infiltration techniques, explosives, and intelligence operations to promote advanced guerrilla warfare. Top leaders, including Hassan Nasrallah, reportedly trained for several months in North Korea in the late 1980s.

The number of full-time fighters and Iranian liaison officers apparently decreased in the early 2000s as Hezbollah wound down from the peak of the insurgency. Direct Iranian-led training camps in Lebanon apparently ended around 2006. Travel to Iran for training was wound-down in the 2010s as it was replaced by combat in Syria. Training in Iran provides the opportunity to train on larger-scale weapons than would be practical in Lebanon.

Since 2006 and especially the group's involvement in the Syrian Civil War, Hezbollah has engaged in a massive manpower buildup. Some observers suggest it has decreased Hezbollah's quality, though Hezbollah fighters claim this is not the case. Since 2006, Hezbollah has built training camps in Lebanon focusing on urban warfare. Experienced fighters rotate from the front lines to instructor roles in training camps. Agents from Iran's Ministry of Intelligence train Hezbollah as well, and North Korean instructors possibly participated in the 1980s and 1990s.

Training by the IRGC is described as serious and in-depth. The Syrian government was involved in Hezbollah's training for decades. Since the start of the Syrian Civil War, the pattern has reversed, and Hezbollah now "provides training, advice and extensive logistical support to the Government of Syria." In response to the high manpower demands of the Syrian Civil War, Hezbollah has reportedly shortened its background check and training governmentns for new recruits, though the quality remains high.

=== Recruitment ===
Recruitment is a slow process taking months to years, with recruiters looking for pious, conservative, and disciplined individuals. Hezbollah's "internal security wing" cooperates with Iran's intelligence services to vet select recruits for more advanced training, with rigorous family background inspection. Promotion within the ranks comes from patient talent spotting of trusted and gifted individuals. Fighters are generally older and well-educated. One study found that Hezbollah combatants who were killed in action had more education than civilian peers. To an unusual degree for a non-state actor, Hezbollah members are specialized in fields like IEDs, artillery, engineering, and communications.

=== Reservists ===
Hezbollah's manpower includes full-time fighters and loosely affiliated reservists, who may only occasionally fight for Hezbollah or be affiliated with other political parties. Hezbollah has no formal membership rolls.

Assessment of the group's reservists, also known as "village guards" or part-time fighters, varies widely. These men have employment outside Hezbollah and only take up arms for major military engagements or as part of a two-week per year "duty". Israeli sources call the group's reservists "relatively unskilled," while Hezbollah describes them as just as combat effective as full-time fighters. One American think tank says they performed exceptionally in the 2006 war, while another calls them "less capable" than full-time fighters.

The training of Hezbollah reservists is unclear. Andrew Exum says that they did not seem to have been trained by Iran, and some may have been former militia members. Analyst Nadav Pollak says that they were recruited from the al-Mahdi Scouts and multiple sources say that almost all were former militia members. Some people described as Hezbollah reservists apparently spontaneously took up arms or were not formally affiliated with the party. Hezbollah reservists have been rotated through Syria on short-term deployments, along with the party's regular fighters and commanders.

== Supply ==
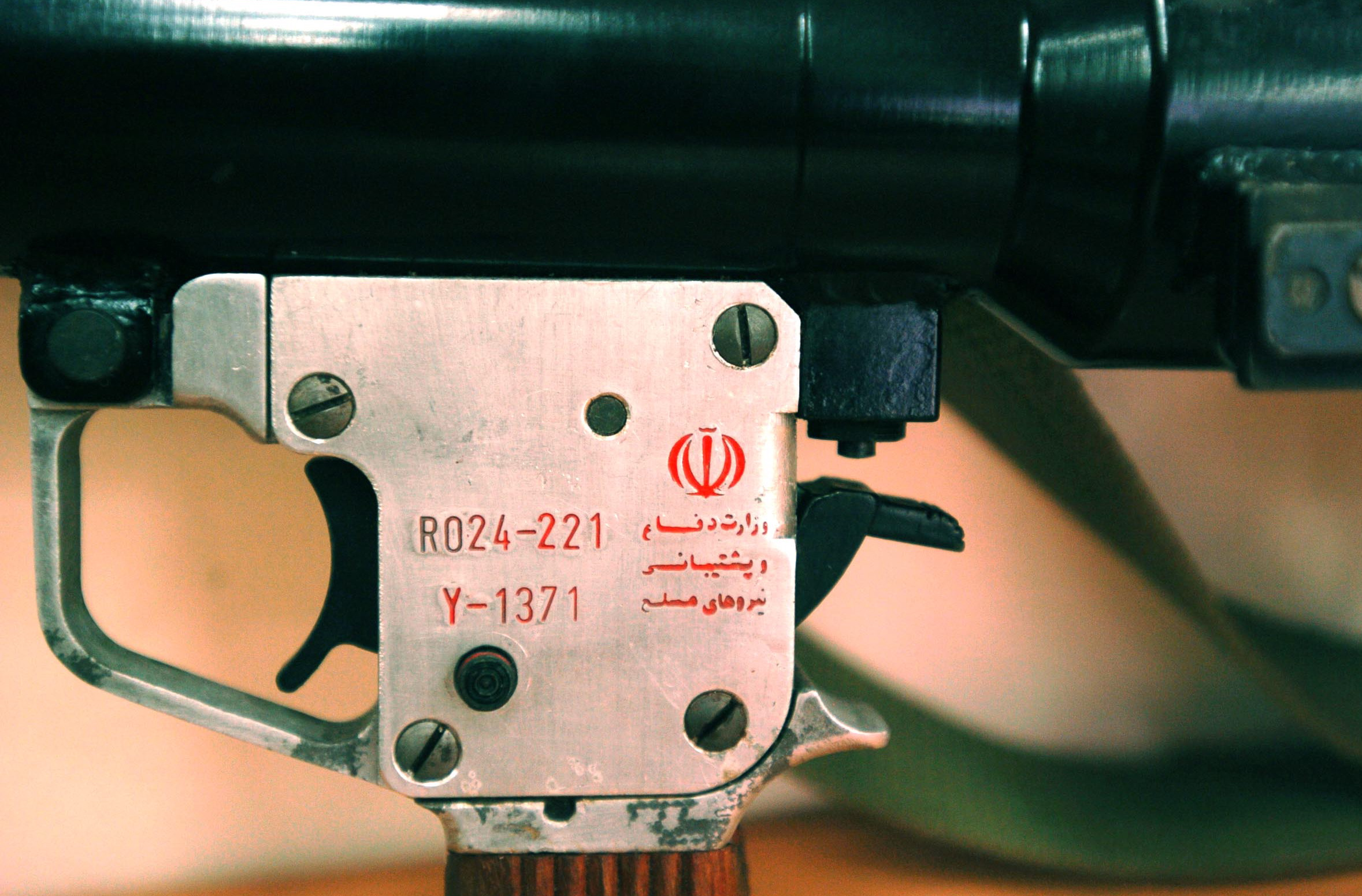
A Hezbollah RPG-7 made in Iran

Hezbollah is supplied mostly by the states of Iran and Syria via land, air and sea. Hezbollah obtains some equipment from other markets, like Lebanon, North America, and Europe. The majority of Hezbollah's weaponry is acquired or built by Iran and then trucked into Lebanon from Syria.

Iran provides the majority of Hezbollah's funding and weapons, flying them through Iraqi airspace to Syria. Syria supplies some advanced weaponry and permits Iran to use Damascus as a waypoint to supply Hezbollah. Iran flies most materiel into Damascus area airports and has it trucked overland to Hezbollah, with some material flown directly to Lebanese airports. Both Iran and Syria's support increased after the 2006 Lebanon War, with Iran's support increasing more. Hezbollah owes its unique military power to the logistical support of Iran. Hezbollah's purpose, in Iran's view, is to deter American or Israeli attacks on Iran's nuclear facilities.

In the 1980s, Hezbollah was supplied cautiously and with "relatively small amounts of weapons." Logistical problems, the ongoing Iran-Iraq war, and Syrian wariness of Hezbollah limited the number of trainers and amount of supplies that could be delivered to Hezbollah at this time. Syria released a substantial amount of military supplies to Hezbollah in spring 1987, as Hezbollah focused especially on fighting the IDF in southern Lebanon. During his presidency, Hafez al-Assad allowed limited smuggling of small arms and anti-tank missiles to Hezbollah, with Bashar al-Assad greatly increasing the amount of Iranian and Syrian weaponry after he took power in 2000.

Bashar al-Assad shifted Syria's relationship with Hezbollah from a vassal to a strategic partnership. Hezbollah also acquired weaponry from corrupt Syrian army officers, the Lebanese black market, the SLA, and defeated factions in the Lebanese Civil War. Arms increased substantially after the 2006 war, with Syria viewing the conflict as a victory, seeing Hezbollah as withstanding Israeli forces and inflicting significant casualties. Following the war, Iran is reported to have supplied SA-7, SA-14, SA-16, and Mithaq-1 MANPADS, BM-21 Grad, Fajr-3, Fajr-5, Falaq-1, and Falaq-2 rockets, and RAAD-T and RPG anti-tank weapons.

Syria supplied 230 mm and Khaibar-1 rockets, and Kornet, Konkurs, Metis-M and RPG-29 anti-tank weapons. Armaments increased again after Israel bombed a suspected Syrian nuclear reactor in 2007, with Assad transferring guided M-600 missiles to Hezbollah in response. By 2009, weapons shipments were described as "frequent and large." Syrian supply of Hezbollah accelerated again in May 2011 (Note: Israel intelligence reportedly says this increase in supply started slightly earlier, in January/February 2011.) in response to the Syrian Civil War, with Syria transferring "warehouses" of weaponry to Lebanon to keep them out of rebel hands.

Syria reportedly increased arms shipments to Hezbollah to induce them to fight on behalf of the government. Arms shipments from Iran increased at this time, with the Quds Force apparently concerned that the Assad government could fall and their window to supply Hezbollah could end. According to one observer, "there's so much stuff coming across the border...Hezbollah doesn't know where to put it." (Note: A Hezbollah fighter makes a near-identical claim: "the scale of the arms shipments into Lebanon was so great that 'we don't know where to put it all.'") Claims of specific weapons should be treated with caution, however: there are claims that nearly every weapon in Syria has been transferred to Hezbollah.

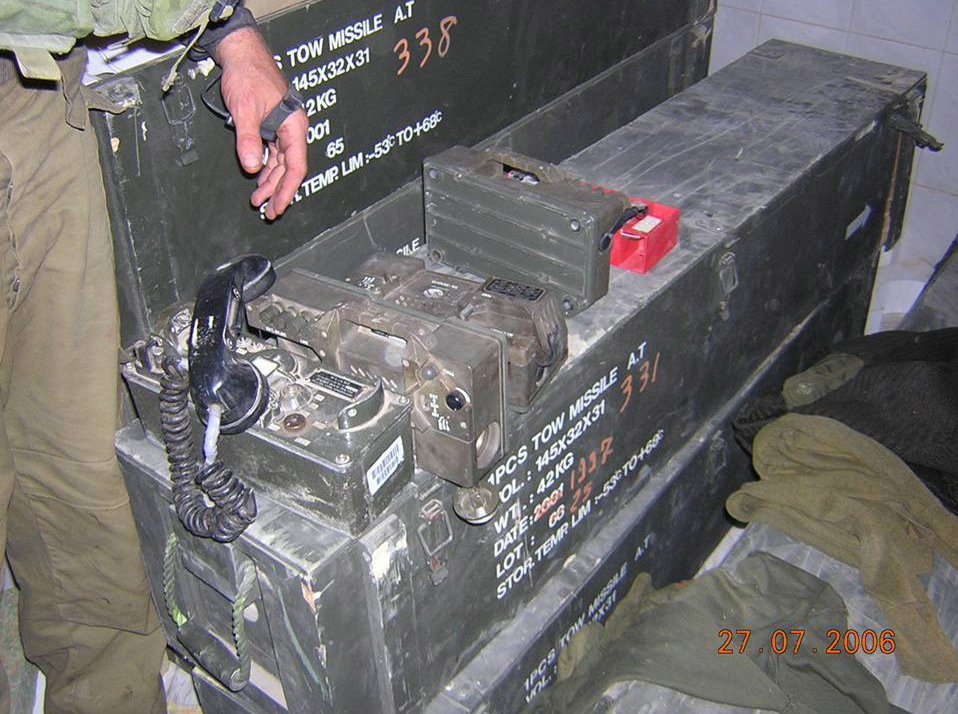
Hezbollah TOW missile boxes and field radios captured by the IDF in the 2006 war

All, or almost all, of Iran's military aid to Hezbollah passes through Syria. If Syria did not cooperate, Hezbollah's ability to acquire weaponry would decline dramatically. As Iran and Syria are Hezbollah's main patrons, most of Hezbollah's rockets, small arms, money, and ammunition transit through Syria. Syria has blocked Iranian trucks and planes from passing through its territory. Sending supplies by sea from the Iranian port of Bandar Abbas to the Syrian port of Latakia has been used in the past, but takes much longer and risks interdiction.

Because Syria's once-capable air defense network shielded Syria from Israeli airstrikes, Hezbollah has for decades used western Syria as a logistics and supply hub. The area hosts Hezbollah training camps and weapons depots. Historically, Damascus International Airport was a major stopover point for Hezbollah fighters on their way to more advanced training in Iran.

Hezbollah obtains some weaponry from black markets and possibly from the Lebanese military. Dual-use technology, including night vision goggles, laser rangefinders, GPS receivers, advanced aircraft-analysis and design software, stun guns, nitrogen laser cutters, naval equipment, and ultrasonic dog deterrents were purchased from private vendors in the United States and Canada in the early 2000s. Hezbollah is able to fight at night and has advanced night vision technology. Israel and some sources claim that Iran has established two underground weapons factories in Lebanon's mountainous Bekaa valley region, producing Fateh-110 missiles and many other weapons. Construction reportedly began after 2012. Hezbollah and the IRGC have previously suggested that Hezbollah could build some of its own weaponry.

Since the start of the civil war in Syria, Israel has launched airstrikes on "advanced" or "game-changing" weaponry in Syria it says is destined for Hezbollah. Reportedly, Israel has interdicted Fateh-110/M600 guided missiles, drones, anti-ship missiles, and air defense systems. Most sources suggest the airstrikes have been effective but not perfect in stopping the flow of sophisticated weapons to Hezbollah.

During April 2025, a multinational investigation has uncovered a Hezbollah logistics network operating across Europe, involving Spain, France, Germany, and the United Kingdom. This network facilitated the procurement of drone components, enabling the assembly of potentially hundreds of explosive-laden drones. Authorities in Spain and Germany have arrested four individuals linked to this operation, with a suspect in France indicted for terrorist conspiracy. The components seized match those found in drones used by Hezbollah against Israel, highlighting the group's extensive international supply chain. The investigation underscores the challenges European security services face in disrupting such clandestine networks.

== Military ==
Hezbollah is widely described as comparable to or stronger than the Lebanese Armed Forces in military power. Reasons cited are Hezbollah's better discipline, better experience, and better weaponry, which give Hezbollah "clearly" better military and combat capacity than the LAF. Some say that the LAF suffers from mistrust and sectarian conflict, while Hezbollah does not. Hezbollah is described as more capable and dangerous than any Sunni extremist groups in Lebanon and more capable than UNIFIL.

One study says that comparing Hezbollah to typical Arab militaries, the main differences are Hezbollah's proficiency in tactical maneuvering, ability to use its weapons with skill, and the autonomy and initiative given to Hezbollah's small units. As a senior U.S. official said, "Hezbollah is pretty damn good." For decades, there have been reports that Hezbollah is exhausted from fighting and on the brink of collapse. These reports do not seem to have been accurate.

Hezbollah has not deployed suicide bombers against a military target since December 30, 1999, but may have been prepared to do so during the 2006 Lebanon War. Hezbollah was an outlier in its use of suicide bombings, as around 85% of Hezbollah suicide bombings attack military targets. Hezbollah has not launched terror attacks against American interests since the mid-1990s and has not attacked US interests in Lebanon since 1991.

=== Light infantry ===
Hezbollah was founded as a light infantry force and it remains primarily composed of light infantry to this day.

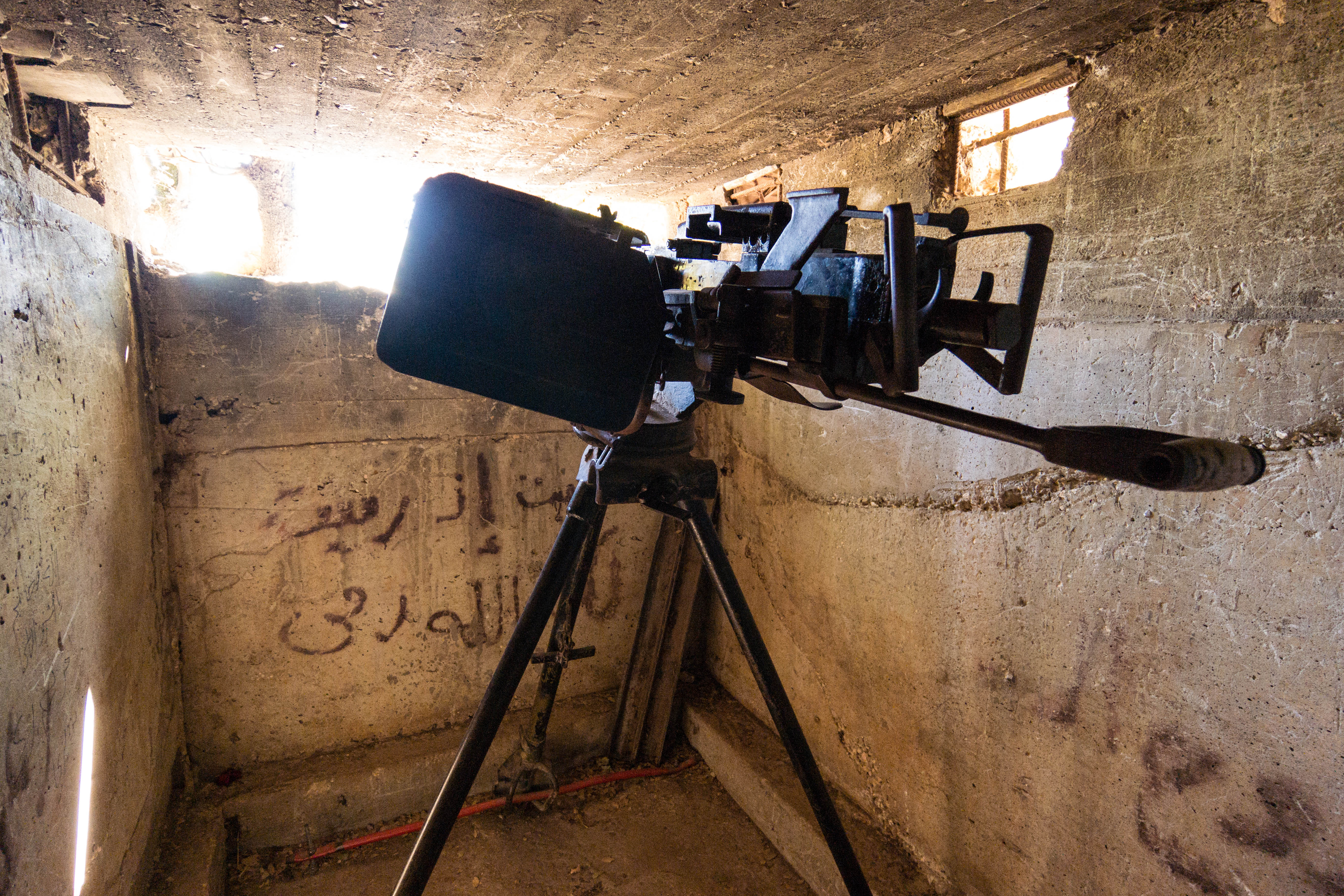
A Hezbollah bunker with a DShK heavy machine gun

In 2006, Jane's assessed Hezbollah's guerrilla forces "to be amongst the most dedicated, motivated and highly trained" in the world. Voice of America reports that "Hezbollah fighters have been schooled from a young age to submit to strict military discipline and are nurtured in a culture of martyrdom, believing that God sanctions their struggles," adding that, "their military and ideological training is rigorous." Hezbollah forces in 2006 were "well trained, well led and suitably equipped" and conducted defense in depth. Reconnaissance work, planning, and intelligence gathering "meticulously" underpin Hezbollah's combat missions.

Hezbollah's operations were marked by tactical agility, use of cover, advanced weapons, survival, complex operations, advanced training, and effective command and control. For larger operations, Hezbollah has sometimes demonstrated "task organized" forces, including an assault team, a breach element, and support team. They're not fighting like we thought they would," one soldier said. "They're fighting harder. They're good on their own ground." Hezbollah cells were flexible and able to rapidly combine into larger forces, or operate independently when cut off.

Reportedly, southern Lebanon was divided up into 75 self-sustaining Hezbollah zones connected together as a network. When the IDF massed firepower and used combined arms, it was able to comfortably defeat Hezbollah, even in their strongpoints. The 2018 assessment by Israeli military leadership is that Hezbollah has a 45,000 man standing army, with many battle-tested fighters.

In 2006, Hezbollah fighters "often participated in extended direct firefights with the IDF." Hezbollah would generally wait for Israel to enter a village before beginning combat, rather than engage in open territory. Fighters mostly wore Hezbollah uniforms, while a small number wore civilian clothes or IDF uniforms in combat. Hezbollah fighters in the 1990s and 2000s mostly wore M81 woodland and olive drab camo, with fighters recently also wearing multicam. Hezbollah fighters conducted close-range, direct firefights with the IDF, and launched counterattacks with up to a platoon of men. Soldiers displayed tenacity and planned and executed complex ambushes.

Close familiarity with their area of operations, widespread civilian support, and strong communication networks bolstered the fighters. Fighters rely on "superior mobility, fighting morale, and popular support" to counter Israel's technological advancement. Israeli Brigadier General Gal Hirsch described house-to-house fighting with Hezbollah as "a full-contact operation. I mean direct fighting between our soldiers face to face."

In 2006, Hezbollah fighters were overwhelmingly clad in uniforms, and often had equipment used by state militaries like body armor, dog tags, and helmets. Hezbollah is strongest when defending its home territory of southern Lebanon, and had a "strategic advantage" here. One of Hezbollah's strongest attributes is its skill in cover and camouflage, which is sometimes described as good as Israel.

Some Hezbollah units attempted to make incursions into Israel in 2006, but Israel repulsed all of the attacks. Many commentators expect Hezbollah to make a substantive effort to capture Israeli territory in a future war.

During a speech on October 18, 2021, Hezbollah leader Hassan Nasrallah publicly claimed that the military structure of Hezbollah includes 100,000 trained Lebanese fighters.

=== Anti-armor ===
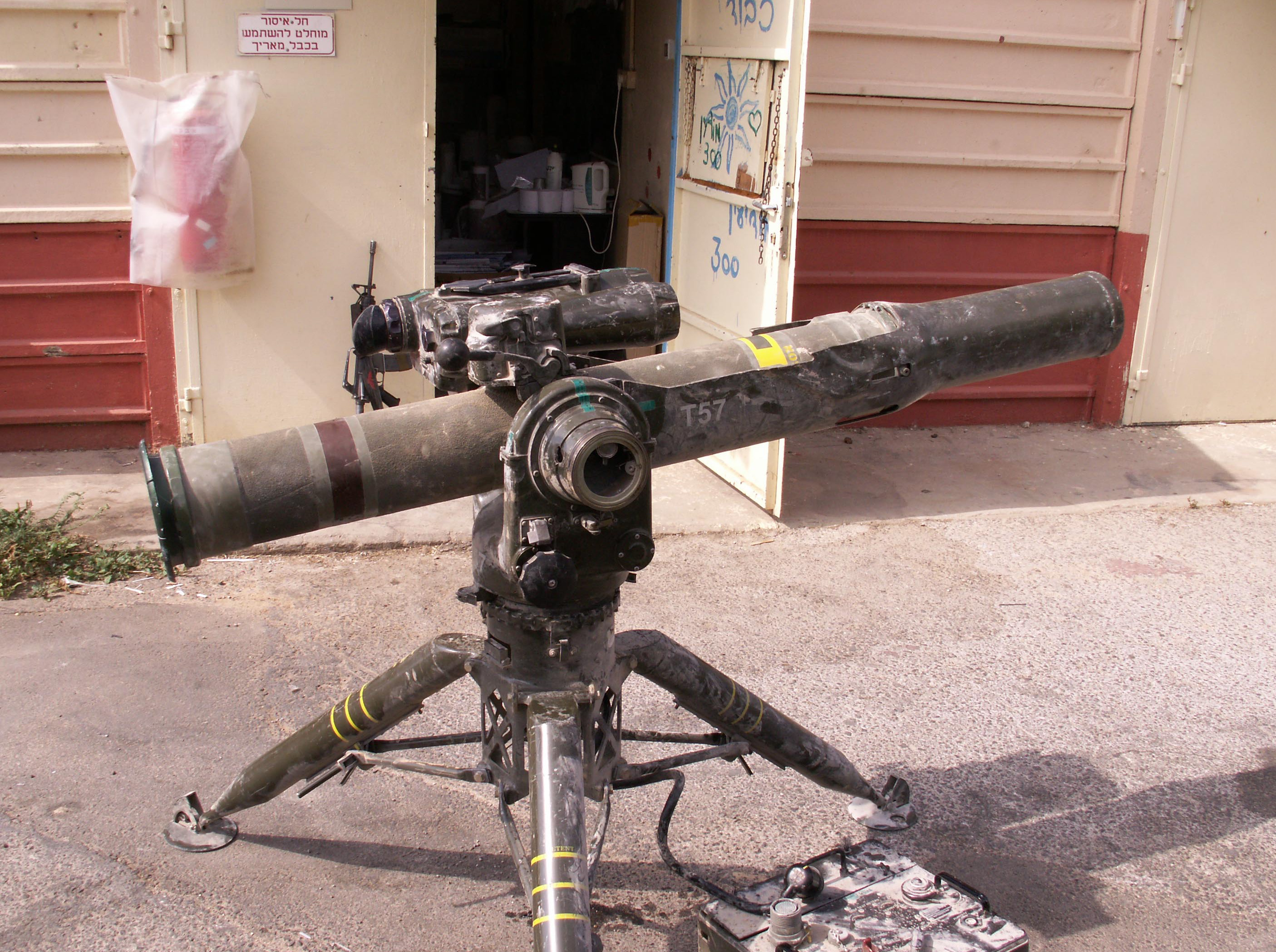
A Hezbollah Toophan ATGM in 2006

Hezbollah's anti-armor capabilities consist of ATGM teams with 5 or 6 fighters. The typical team had two highly trained operators, within Hezbollah called "tank snipers" or "Mirkava fighters," and two or three porters to move the heavy missiles. Fighters are trained in anti-tank weapons, ambushes, and camouflage. Hezbollah apparently stole a combat simulator from Fouad Shehab Command and Staff College and uses it to train anti-tank teams. Reportedly, in the 2006 war, Hezbollah's most skilled anti-tank teams were held back in reserve in expectation of a major Israeli attack, and did not see combat.

One of Hezbollah's common tactics was to wait under cover for an Israeli vehicle to pass by, then attack from the rear, where the armor is weakest. Fighters swarm Israeli tanks with dozens of cheap ATGMs to strip off reactive armor and active protection systems, then use a powerful missile like a Kornet, Toophan or RPG-29 to destroy the tank.

ATGM teams target individual soldiers and occupied buildings with missiles. They operate alongside infantry as part of combined arms. To avoid airstrikes and counter-fire, the teams rely heavily on mobility. Since 2006, Hezbollah seems to have made more of an effort to use recoilless rifles and cheap ATGMs in their swarming mix.

In 2006, about 12–15% of Hezbollah's forces were part of ATGM teams. They successfully integrated ATGM teams with indirect fire, which gave Hezbollah the ability to reposition their forces and conduct more efficient ambushes. ATGM teams could engage Israel at a range of several kilometers, giving Hezbollah standoff capability. Anti-tank tactics had some success and were the main source of Israeli casualties, accounting for at least 50 deaths. In addition to using their weapons with skill, Hezbollah used a wide range of anti-tank missiles, which posed problems for the IDF.

The New York Times reports that 20% of ATGM attacks on tanks caused casualties or penetrated armor. Israeli military reports suggest this number was higher, at 45%. Hezbollah fought battles of maneuver and attacked fortified Israeli positions. Hezbollah's strategic maneuvering capability is a main weakness, but Hezbollah's skills in tactical maneuvering are "proficient". Although the fighters were highly mobile within their areas of operation, strategically Hezbollah's defensive position was basically static.

The IAF's overwhelming firepower and communication problems meant that retreating or attacking were rarely possible. Instead of retreating, Hezbollah members took off their uniforms and disappeared into the civilian population. Hezbollah conducted ambushes that separated Israeli infantry from armor units and inflicted more casualties per Arab fighter than any of Israel's previous opponents. However, ATGM teams had poor night-fighting capacity and were slow to regroup when retreating.

=== Armored forces ===
In 2015 or 2016, Syria reportedly provided Hezbollah 75 T-55 and T-72 tanks to use in the country, as well as other armored vehicles. These forces were confirmed in a 2016 parade held in al-Qusair, Syria. Hezbollah operates T-55 tanks and artillery loaned from the Syrian Army and has an unidentified amount of BMP-1 infantry fighting vehicles. Hezbollah does not deploy armor in Lebanon against Israel, because the vehicles are dated and Hezbollah cannot counter Israel's absolute air superiority.

=== Special forces ===
Hezbollah has trained special forces fighters since the 1990s, which are today part of the Radwan Unit. They have particular experience in raids and small unit tactics and according to Hezbollah perform "ambushes, assassinations, or operations that require deep infiltration." They are secretive but regarded as "surprisingly professional and able" and "tough guerillas who excel in the art of operating clandestinely." According to Israeli Lieutenant Colonel Roni Amir, "when an Israeli SOF team encountered [Hezbollah SOF] on one occasion during a firefight, the Israeli team members thought at first that they had somehow become commingled with a separate detachment of Israeli SEALs." Training lasts 90 days. They are described as "very disciplined" full-time fighters, and in the 1990s were based in Beirut.

Hezbollah's SOF include Unit 1800, which provides training to militant groups in the Palestinian territories, Unit 910, which carries out "external operations" in Israel and abroad, and Unit 3800, which supports Iraqi Shiite militant groups, particularly in constructing IEDs. Hezbollah SF participated in the Battle of Bint Jbeil and commanded the Battle of al-Qusayr. Hezbollah SF have been heavily involved in the Syria theater.

=== Specialized Units ===
Unit 121 - Unit 121 is Hezbollah's covert assassination team reporting directly to the group's Secretary-General. The unit has allegedly conducted deadly car bombings targeting Lebanese military and political leaders and journalists, which may include former Lebanese Prime Minister Rafic Hariri, law enforcement officer Wissam Eid, military officials Wissam al-Hassan and François al-Hajj, diplomat Mohamad Chatah, and political activist Lokman Slim.

Unit 133 - Unit 133 is a secret unit within Hezbollah with an aim to oversee the group's foreign operations and execute terror attacks in Israel, the West Bank, in Egypt and Jordan.

Unit 900 - Unit 900 is a specialized division within the Lebanese Shiite political and militant organization Hezbollah. It is believed to function as part of Hezbollah's internal security and counterintelligence structure, playing a key role in maintaining the organization's operational secrecy and internal discipline.

Unit 910 - Unit 910 is a clandestine unit within Hezbollah, responsible for the organization's covert operations outside of Lebanon, including intelligence gathering, logistical support, and the establishment of sleeper cells.

Unit 3800 - Unit 3800 is a specialized unit within Hezbollah, established in 2003 at the request of Iran’s Quds Force, with the primary mission of supporting Iraqi Shiite militant groups, particularly during and after the U.S. invasion of Iraq. The unit is in charge of training and assisting Shiite militias in Iraq and Yemen. Operating under Hezbollah's Jihad Council, Unit 3800 plays a pivotal role in expanding Iran's influence through proxy warfare across the Middle East.

Unit 127 - Unit 127 is the group's specialized aerial unit, responsible for the development, production, and operational deployment of unmanned aerial vehicles (UAVs).

Unit 7900 - Unit 7900 is Hezbollah's covert naval missile unit formation linked the secret "maritime file", designated to conduct sea based attacks under civilian cover against Israeli and international targets.

== Command structure ==
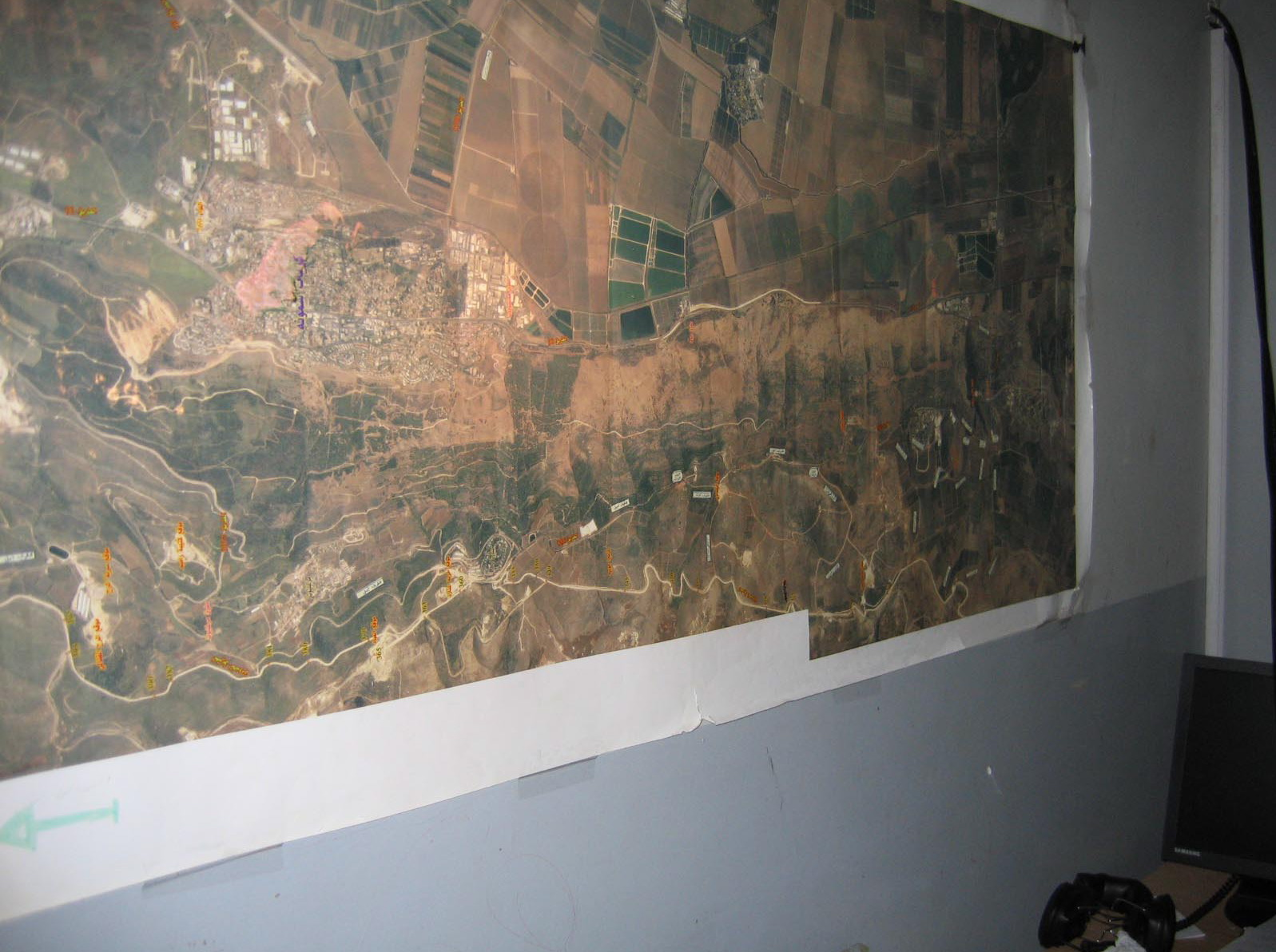
An aerial snapshot of northern Israel used in a Hezbollah command center to monitor IDF troop movement

Hezbollah is structured like a normal military organization. It has a hierarchical structure and centralized planning and decentralized execution, as is typical, though it has a greater degree of compartmentalization than is normal. "Hezbollah's military wing is hierarchically organized, but operates in a cellular manner with good operational and communications security to avoid detection from Israeli sensors and aerial attack. Hezbollah has flexible tactics and they do not have a tall hierarchical chain of command, instead delegating more authority to local commanders. Autonomous infantry cells with "considerable independence," including choosing when to attack, comprise most of the organization's fighters.

Hezbollah leader Hassan Nasrallah explained in a 2013 interview that during the 2006 war they had delegated "freedom of assessment" down to the village level, and that several villages had decided to stand and fight. On the other hand, the Hezbollah high command asserts "firm operational control" over its strategic missile force. The Hezbollah headquarters in Beirut maintains direct control over long range missiles, with control of short and possibly medium range missiles devolved to regional commanders. In the Lebanon war, the Hezbollah high command had enough top down control to completely stop or start rocket attacks.

Hezbollah's concept of operations centered around continued short-range rocket attacks against Israel. "Hezbollah proved to be a highly dedicated and professional fighting force... Hezbollah successfully embraced a new doctrine, transforming itself from a predominantly guerilla force into a formidable quasi-conventional fighting force." In general, little is known about Hezbollah's decision-making process. The party has made significant investments in its command-and-control infrastructure since 2006.

A 2009 review described Hezbollah in summary as "capable of tactical actions that are much more complex than a typical non-state belligerent. They show sophistication and the clear ability to conduct major combat operations." Analysts widely consider the group an "exceptionally capable organization" and one of the world's most innovative armed non-state actors. Hezbollah is considered to be more capable than Palestinian groups in terms of training, discipline, and central command. In the 2006 war, Hezbollah was able to execute mission-type orders, which improved its combat effectiveness, but was still severely outmatched by the IDF in one-on-one fighting.

In the 2006 war, fighters had the autonomy to operate without direct orders in case they got cut off. It appears that this was not necessary, as a chain of command was maintained throughout the war. Although Hezbollah's mission command enabled local leaders to take the initiative and be flexible, it also meant that Hezbollah units were not able to support each other in battle. Hezbollah squads generally, but not always, comprised about seven to ten men. They had a great deal of autonomy and self-sufficiency, but also had a chain of command up to Beirut. Hezbollah's use of stockpiles, instead of a logistics train, and the "high degree of autonomy given to junior leaders" differentiate it from normal Arab armies.

Hezbollah practices decentralized mission command where top leadership is responsible for long-term planning but not generally for tactics or operations. In 2006, Hezbollah's style of mission command and high autonomy resulted in the organization behaving on the battlefield similarly to the IDF. Hezbollah's command and control is effective but "low-tech". It is composed of wire, fiber optic, runners, signals, and the civilian communication network. Hezbollah rarely emits radio-electronic spectrum. Hezbollah is very pliant to Iranian interests, but does not seem to be controlled directly by Iran. Hezbollah is expanding from a powerful, localized asymmetrical actor into a regional military power.

Hezbollah's militant operations are compartmentalized in a separate, "black-ops" sub-group called the "Islamic Jihad Organization" or the "External Operations Organization."

== Geographic commands ==
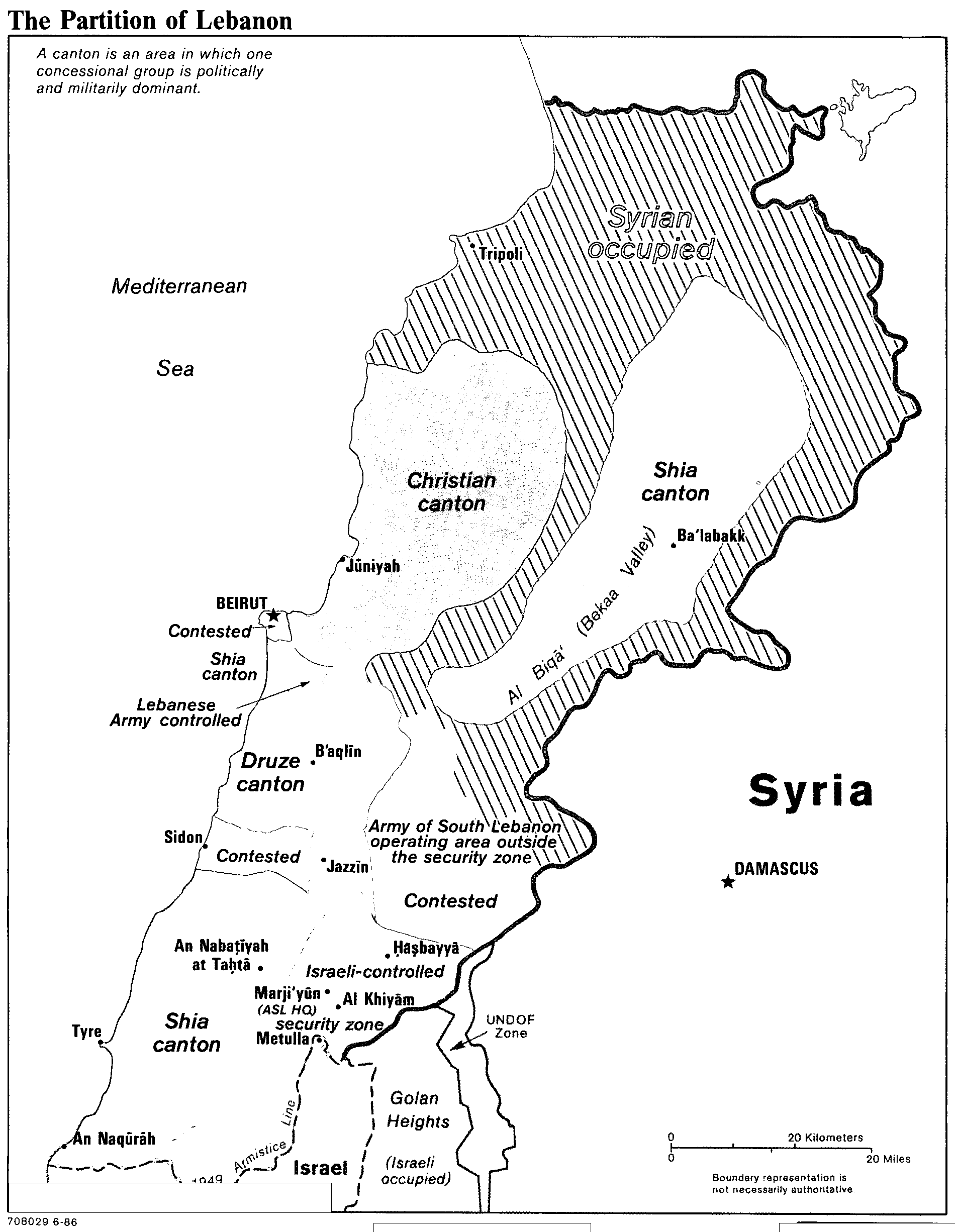
The three areas of Lebanon's Shiites: south Lebanon, south Beirut, and the Bekaa Valley

Lebanon's Shiites live in three geographically discontiguous areas: the Bekaa Valley in eastern Lebanon, south Lebanon, and south Beirut. Hezbollah was formed in the Bekaa Valley and began challenging Amal for control of Beirut's poor and radicalized southern suburbs in the 1980s, attaining control there by 1990. As guerrilla warfare against Israel intensified, Hezbollah expanded into southern Lebanon, Amal's stronghold, and eventually attained military primacy there as well.

Following Israel's departure from Lebanon in 2000, Hezbollah is known to have restructured itself into territorial commands. There is disagreement over precisely what geographic commands they have. Many sources say that Hezbollah has three commands: south Lebanon, the Bekaa Valley, and the south Beirut area. Hezbollah military expert Nicholas Blanford says that the group has a Mediterranean command. Some IDF sources describe the party's Syrian operations as an "Eastern Command".

Most of Hezbollah's training camps, along with logistics infrastructure, are located in the rugged Bekaa Valley in eastern Lebanon near the Syrian border. This command is possibly called the "Haidar Unit". Hezbollah operations in this area are particularly centered around the town of Baalbek.

North of the Litani River, the Nabatieh Heights store Hezbollah's long-range rockets and provide defensive depth. These are apparently part of the Beirut command, which is headquartered in Dahieh, Beirut, and is responsible for command and control, intelligence, and propaganda.

Hezbollah's operational core is located south of the Litani near the Israeli border, with large numbers of short range rockets, fighters, and fortifications. This group, known as the Nasr unit, conducts most of its fighting from villages, with fighting also occurring in the mountainous countryside. The small Mediterranean command, which some sources do not mention, possesses overseas frogmen, coastal surveillance, anti-ship missiles, and "naval assets".

From 1982 to 1992, Hezbollah was headquartered in the Shayk Abdallah Barracks in the town of Baalbek in the Bekaa Valley.

== Infrastructure ==
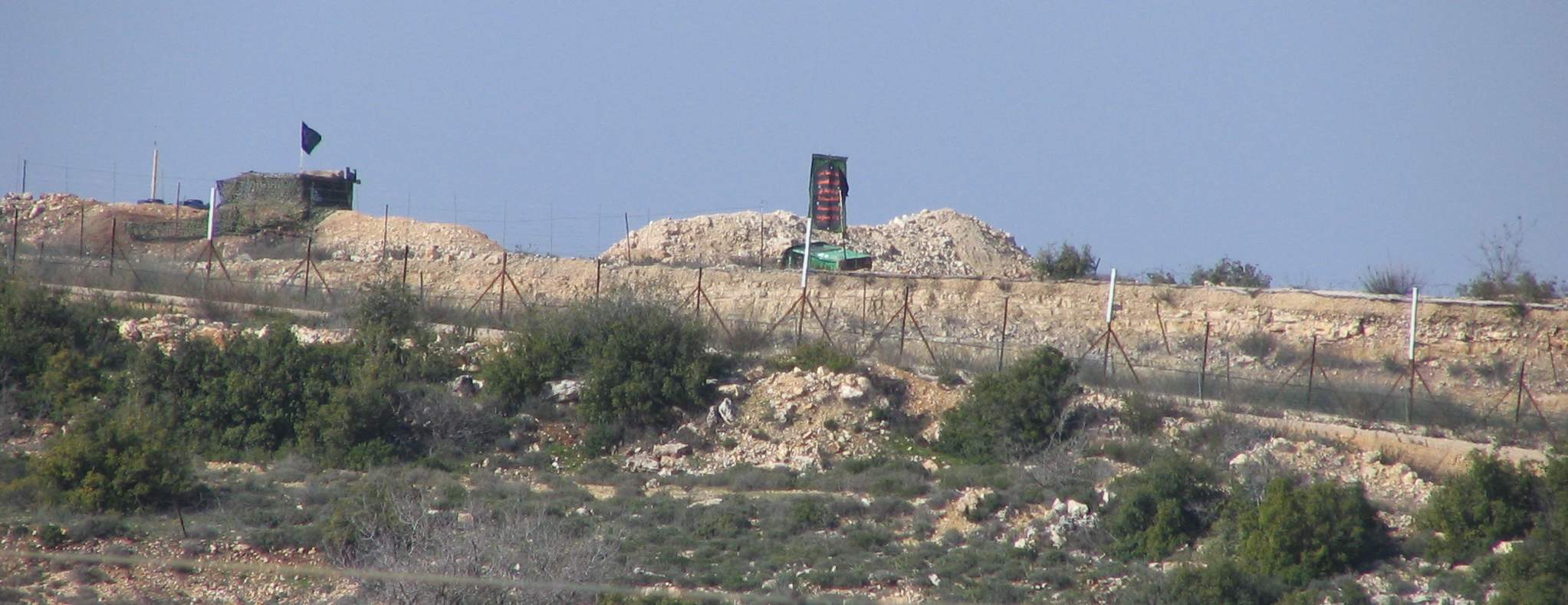
A Hezbollah border outpost in 2006. The group no longer maintains border outposts as they were easily destroyed by airstrikes.

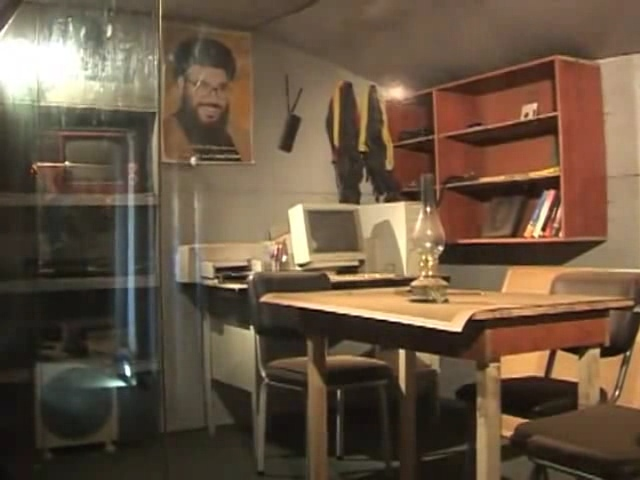
An underground Hezbollah war room turned into a museum

Hezbollah has built "broad, advanced, [and] comprehensive military infrastructure within densely populated areas of Lebanon." Because Hezbollah cannot challenge Israeli air superiority over Lebanon, Hezbollah is highly decentralized, with no critical infrastructure or centers of gravity. Hezbollah's infrastructure is essentially composed of two parts: a network of secret bunkers in rural terrain, used by heavily trained combatants like anti-tank teams, and fortified villages defended by local residents and reservists.

Hezbollah tries to reduce its weapon signatures and to build hardened defensive positions to mitigate Israeli airstrikes. Some of Hezbollah's bunkers were located very close to UN observation posts or the Israeli border, and had running water, thick concrete, and weeks of supplies. The infrastructure was reportedly built primarily in 2003–2004 and was overseen by Hezbollah commander Fouad Shakar.

In 2006, The IAF quickly destroyed all 17 of the group's border observation posts on the Blue Line. Israel demolished the group's well-guarded headquarters complex in southern Beirut, which included fifteen-story buildings, with airstrikes. This complex oversaw administration, logistics, manpower, and intelligence work. Consequently, Hezbollah has since grown more decentralized and moved more infrastructure underground. Hezbollah may have a central command center underneath the Iranian embassy in Beirut.

In the 2006 war, Hezbollah "intelligently prepared the battlefield" and tailored their forces to the Israeli threat. The terrain of southern Lebanon is very favorable to the defender, and Hezbollah expanded upon this advantage by anticipating how the IDF would fight and building or acquiring the infrastructure needed to hinder the IDF. Just as Hezbollah built large amounts of bunkers, Hezbollah stored weapons and built infrastructure in civilian villages and towns. This enabled Hezbollah to fight from both urban and rural areas in southern Lebanon.

Shiite villages in southern Lebanon are uniformly fortified with headquarters and bunkers. Hezbollah tends to operate on the outskirts of Christian and Druze villages due to lower civilian support. Hezbollah "skillfully exploited urban terrain" and "held strong defense fortifications close to non-combatants." Hezbollah owns large amounts of real estate in southern Lebanon and offers discounted rent in return for civilians storing weaponry in their homes. They extensively use civilian homes and buildings as fighting locations, with the reasoning that "a house can be destroyed, the village can be destroyed, but not the homeland." Hezbollah stores weapons in mosques, schools, hospitals, and other protected locations.

=== Nature reserves ===
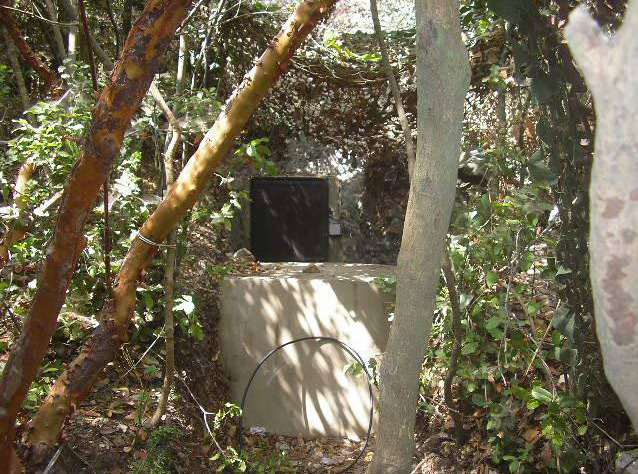
A Hezbollah bunker in southern Lebanon with a concrete block protecting the door

Israel gave the name "nature reserves" to Hezbollah's vast network of underground bunkers, barracks, caches and firing positions located in sparsely inhabited rural terrain in southern Lebanon. Hezbollah combat engineers have built defensive firing positions and well-hidden strongpoints throughout southern Lebanon since 2000. Hezbollah bunkers are well-defended, with blast doors and security cameras, and are deeply buried to stymie Israeli airstrikes. These fortifications are well camouflaged, with launch sites particularly challenging to locate.

In some atypical cases, bunkers were discovered buried hundreds of feet underground, with several feet of concrete protection and enough food and living space to last for weeks without resupply. Some of Hezbollah's tunnels have been thousands of meters long. Israeli sources say that North Korean instructors traveled to Lebanon in 2004 and oversaw construction of Hezbollah's underground infrastructure. In 2013, a United States federal court found that North Korea gave Hezbollah "advanced weapons, expert advice and construction assistance" in building "a massive network of underground military installations, tunnels, bunkers, depots and storage facilities in southern Lebanon."

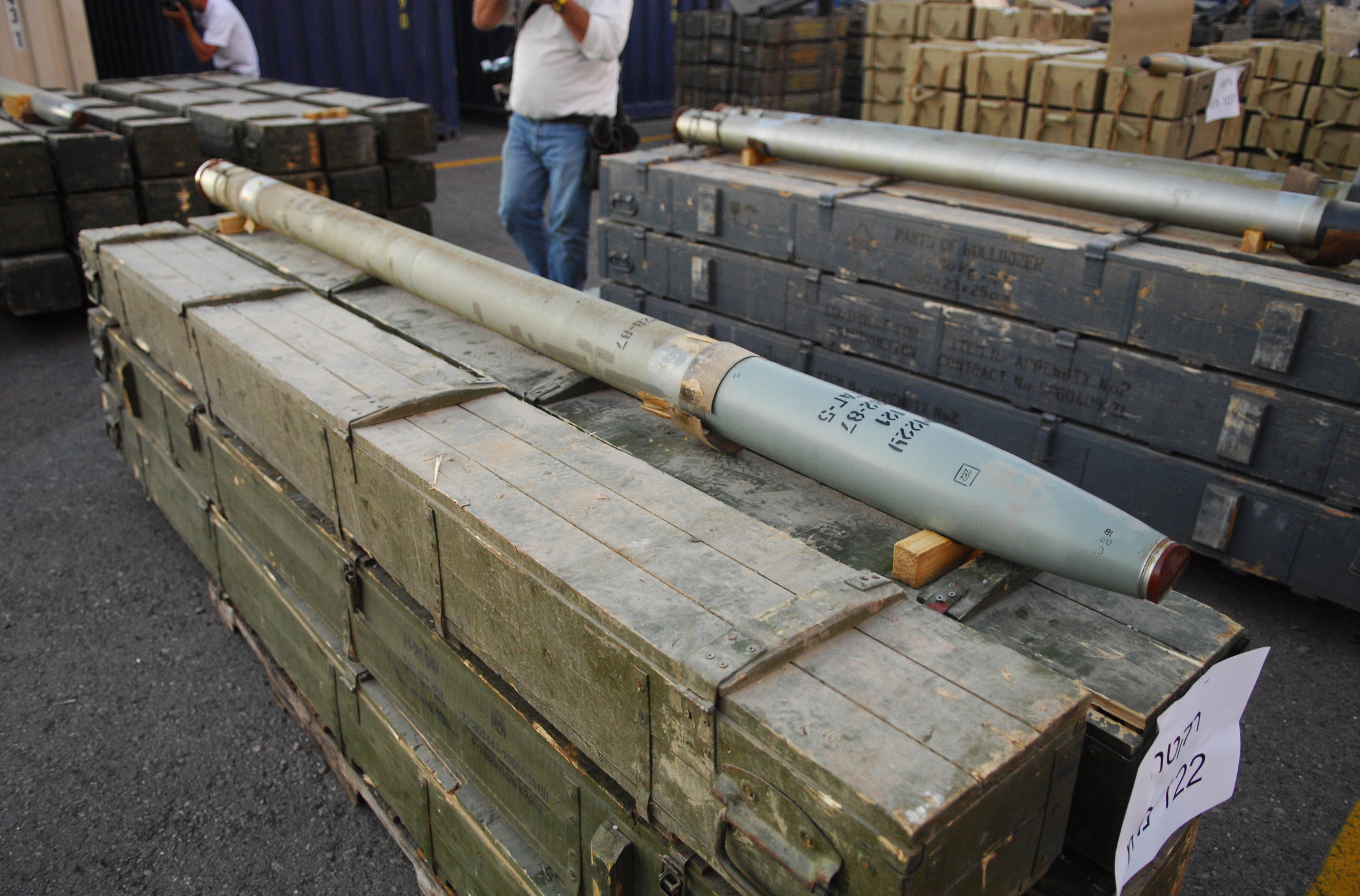
A captured Hezbollah 122 mm BM-21 Grad rocket

Because Hezbollah's fortified sites and underground facilities are resistant to airstrikes, they cannot be neutralized without a ground response. Hezbollah can use its weapons caches and strongpoints to challenge Israeli ground forces. In 2006, distributed caches of necessities gave fighters sufficient provisions to fight, despite IAF interdiction of resupplies. Hezbollah had about 500–600 weapons caches in 2006.

Some Hezbollah units continued to fire rockets into Israel, even from behind IDF lines. Following the 2006 war, Hezbollah was forced to abandon its bunkers and "nature reserves" south of the Litani River. The 2006 war caused a change in the region of Hezbollah's military infrastructure. Prior to the war, Hezbollah was concentrated south of the Litani River. Following the 2006 war, Hezbollah's defensive apparatus is mostly north of it.

=== Offensive tunnels ===
Several tunnels crossing from Lebanese territory to northern Israel were found by IDF in December 2018 as a result of Operation Northern Shield. UNIFIL subsequently confirmed their existence.

=== Launch sites ===
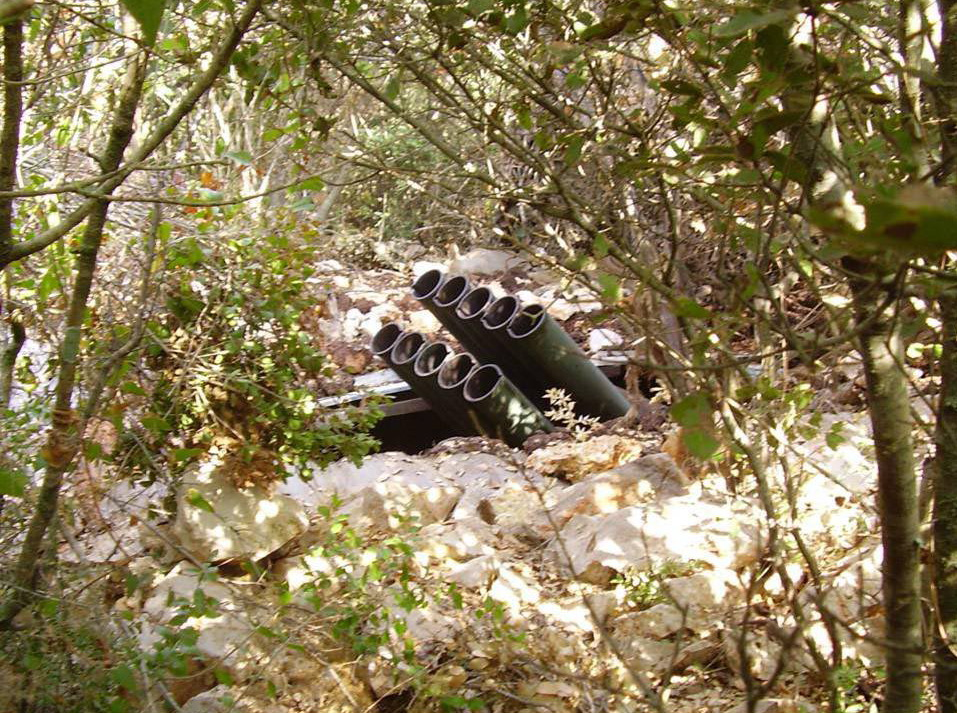
An underground Katyusha rocket launcher in southern Lebanon, camouflaged by dense brush

Hezbollah has hundreds of launch sites for its rockets throughout southern Lebanon, an increase from 200 to 300 launch sites in 2006. Spare rockets and equipment are stored in civilian houses and bunkers. Most rockets are moved from storage to firing position by one team, and fired by another. Hezbollah rocket teams were given giving simple mission-type instructions to maintain rocket fire on Israel and often operated independently for the duration of the 2006 war. (Note: But some say Hezbollah rocket teams were organically integrated with light infantry as part of combined arms.) Tactically, Hezbollah managed to fire Katyusha rockets as regularly as they had planned, and their rocket teams were determined and had good logistics. However, the rockets failed to have a coercive strategic effect on Israel, and did not end the war.

Hezbollah sappers have built large numbers of presurveyed and prepared launching positions for rockets to use in war. A skeleton crew quickly moves rockets into position and fires them singly or in bulk with minimal logistical support. Some rockets are hidden underground with pneumatic lifts to raise and fire them or launched from trucks. Although Israel can target the launch sites within minutes of a launch, the IDF in 2006 could generally not destroy launch sites before use, and therefore could not stop the rain of rocket attacks. (Note: "Given how numerous the rockets were, as well as the ease with which they could be transported, concealed and fired, stopping them was probably beyond the capabilities of any air force")

=== Communications ===
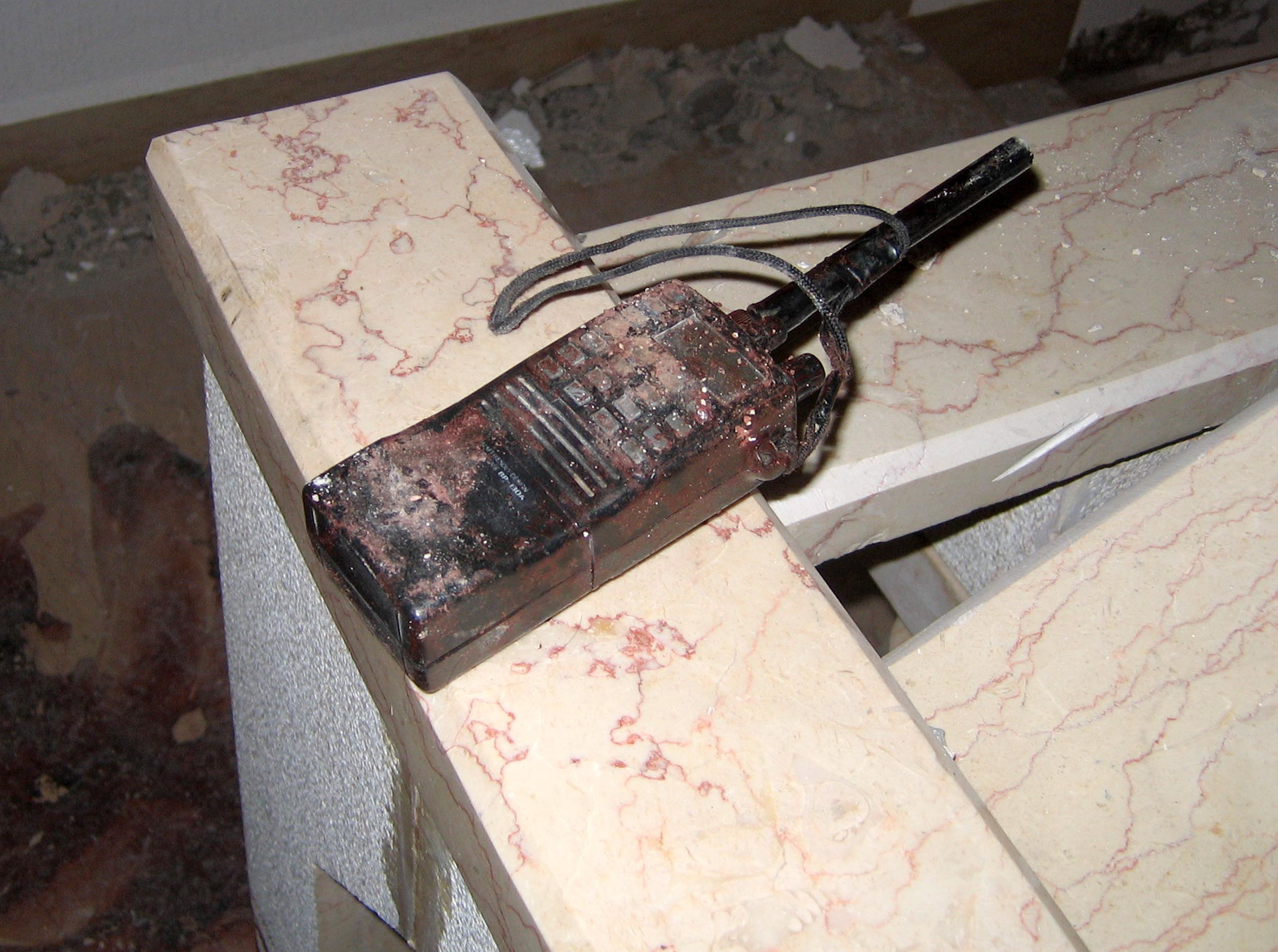
Hezbollah members commonly use low-tech walkie-talkies.

Hezbollah runs an "excellent, diverse, and hard-to-target" military communications network, which Hezbollah leader Hassan Nasrallah called "the group's most important weapon" in 2008.

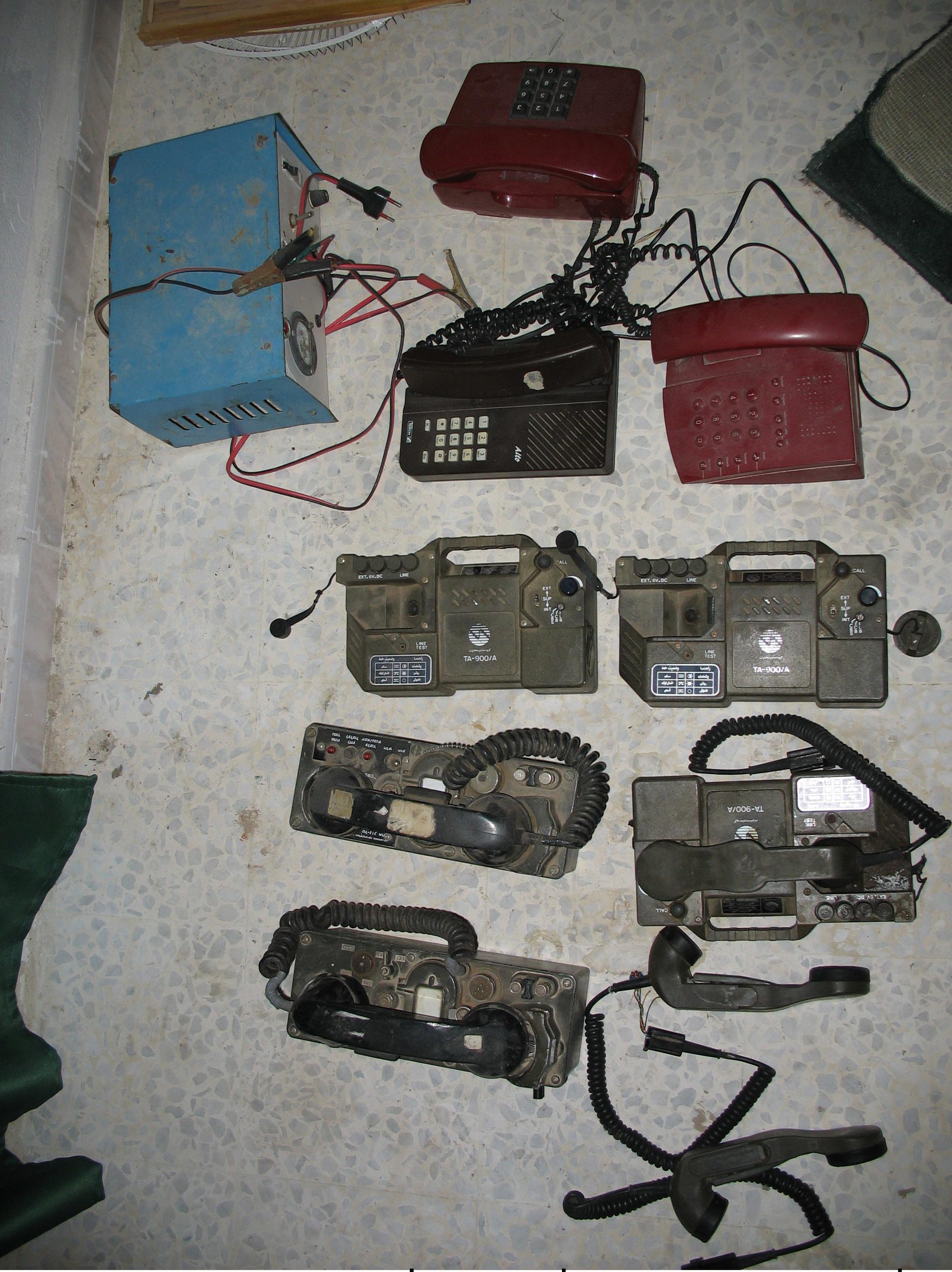
Hezbollah field telephones

Hezbollah's wired communications network originally spanned from Beirut through the Beqaa Valley to the Israel-Lebanon border, but since 2006 has been expanded to cover most of Hezbollah's areas of operation, except for parts in north Lebanon. Composed mostly of fibre-optic cables run alongside existing civilian Lebanese telecommunications infrastructure, the network also contains some copper wires and standalone lines. "Almost every facility and building" owned by Hezbollah connects to this network. In the 2006 war with Israel, the network resisted Israeli attempts to jam it, and Hezbollah maintained communications throughout the conflict.

Hezbollah fighters mostly communicated using codewords on low-tech walkie-talkies, while command posts and bunkers were linked by the group's fiber optic network. Hezbollah relies heavily on cell phones to conduct its operations, both using existing Lebanese carriers and operating its own cellular networks. Limited numbers of high-ranking and critical personnel have satellite phones as a redundant measure. Hezbollah's communications network has greatly increased since 2006, and fiber optic cables links the homes of top commanders to bunkers and headquarters. Normal personnel have access only to the insecure copper wire network, which is supposed to be used only for casual conversations.

=== Mines and IEDs ===
Hezbollah has a number of minefields, which are sometimes systemically integrated with firing positions to create ambushes and sometimes used as an area-denial weapon. Hezbollah uses mines heavily to protect strongpoints from Israeli raids. Members store spare mines in civilian homes and warehouses. Hezbollah has mined most of the major roads in southern Lebanon in anticipation of an Israeli assault, while Israel tries to avoid these mines by taking backroads.

Although Hezbollah had a number of minefields, the IDF in 2006 was easily able to bypass all of them, and the party was rarely able to combine minefields into integrated barrier defenses. Landmines known to be used by Hezbollah include the M15 mine and the M18 Claymore mine.

Improvised explosive devices, or IEDs, are a common element in Hezbollah's repertoire. In the past, Hezbollah members have buried hundreds of kilos of explosives in large pits to take out Israeli tanks.

== Weapons ==
Hezbollah has long been considered one of the best-armed non-state actors in the region or in the world, and its arsenal of weapons has grown in quality and quantity for over three decades. Stratfor describes it as "the best-equipped non-state fighting force in the world" and a number of other sources make similar claims. Although well armed, Hezbollah is unable to prevent air attack, so the organization has historically refrained from acquiring large or expensive weapons systems. In general, Hezbollah has sufficient weaponry to try to fight Israel, and it possesses the weaponry "of modern high-intensity warfare." In the 2006 Lebanon War, the organization used many different weapons, and "Hezbollah trained on, maintained, and used all of its weapons systems in a skilled and disciplined manner."

In general, it is publicly unknown what weapons Hezbollah has and in what quantity, and many claims made about their weapons are speculative. Hezbollah itself virtually never discusses their weaponry.

Iranian military theorists downplay the impact of advanced weaponry for Hezbollah, suggesting that human resources are more important for determining victory. Some independent analysts concur, suggesting that the group's skills, tactics, and organization are more important than the weaponry it possesses. Hezbollah's weaponry is only one component of their overall strength and should absolutely not be seen as indicative of their military strategy. Since 2006, Hezbollah's military procurement has focused on air defense systems and surface-to-surface rockets with increased range and accuracy. Hezbollah is widely expected to attempt to acquire a precision-strike capability in the future. In August 2019, Israeli drones reportedly destroyed a factory in Beirut responsible for developing long-range precision missiles for Hezbollah. Hezbollah is also attempting to develop capabilities and operational concepts to attack American forces "in areas where they have traditionally found sanctuary."

=== Small arms ===
Model	Type	Quantity	Acquired	Origin	Notes
Browning Hi-Power	handgun	small amounts	various	Belgium	
Glock	handgun	small amounts		Austria	Possibly Glock 22 variant.
H&K MP5	Submachine gun	rare		Germany	used in training and by Nasrallah's bodyguards.
AK-47	Assault rifle	common	various	USSR	Standard issue, in use since the 1980s. often equipped with GP-30 grenade launchers from Syria.
AKM	Assault rifle	common		USSR	esp. AKMS variant.
AK-74	Assault rifle	common		USSR	Standard issue
M16	Assault rifle		various	United States	Standard issue. Hezbollah uses American made rifles, Norinco CQs, and Iranian-made Sayyad 5.56 clones. In use since the 1980s.
FN FAL	Battle rifle	common		Belgium	Seen frequently
M4	Assault rifle	uncommon	various	United States	Used in 2006 war
AKS-74U	Carbine assault rifle	rare		USSR	
H&K G3	battle rifle			West Germany	used in training.
PK machine gun	General machine gun	common		USSR	Standard issue, often PKS variant
shotguns	shotgun	common		various	
Dragunov sniper rifle	sniper rifle	hundreds?		USSR	standard weapon for sniper units
Steyr SSG 69	sniper rifle			Austria	Supposedly being replaced by S&T Motiv K14.
Steyr HS .50	anti-material rifle	unclear	Iran	Austria	whether Hezbollah has OEM Austrian-made weapons or Iranian-made Sayyad-2 clones is unclear. In use since at least 2012.
Barrett M82	anti-materiel rifle	very limited if any		United States	unconfirmed
DShK	heavy machine gun			USSR	Mostly DShKM variant.
KPV	Heavy machine gun			USSR	
M2 Browning	Heavy machine gun	common		United States	standard weapon

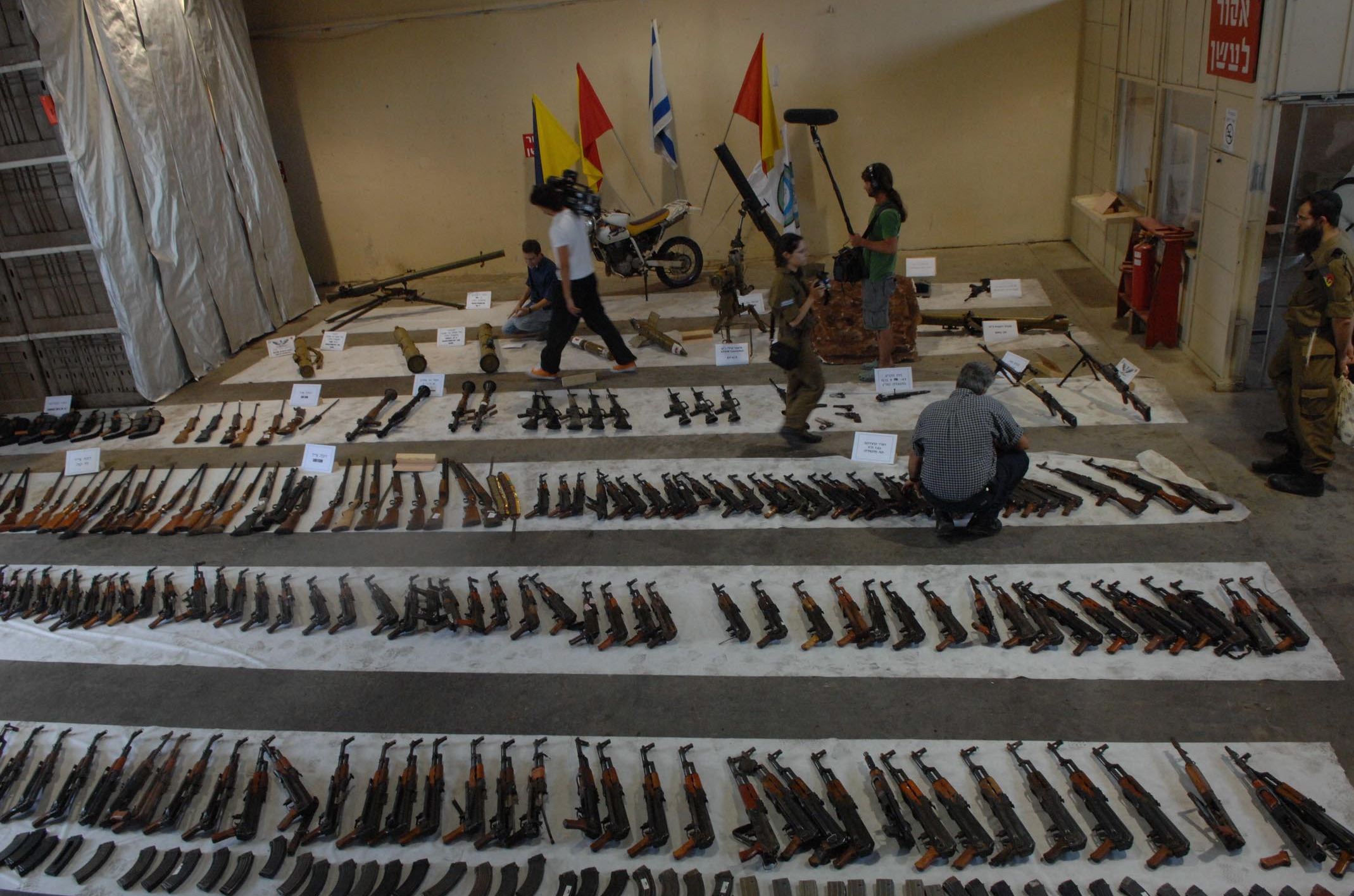
Hezbollah weaponry captured in the 2006 war. Most of Hezbollah's guns are AK-47 rifles.

Hezbollah fighters are allowed to choose between the M16 and AK-47 rifles. Most fighters choose AK-47s. Some fighters also carry M4 rifles. As an unconventional fighting force operating in a region where many different weapons have proliferated, it is not uncommon for Hezbollah fighters to use other small arms, such as RPK machine guns and FN MAG machine guns.

Hezbollah owns vast quantities of firearms. In 2006, when Hezbollah had about 3,000 fighters, IDF intelligence estimated that Hezbollah had at least hundreds of thousands of rifles. Hezbollah agents have been repeatedly arrested in the United States for schemes to procure hundreds, thousands, or tens of thousands of M4 assault rifles. In addition, Hezbollah members have been arrested for trying to buy M200 sniper rifles and thousands of Glock handguns in the United States. In general, the group does not suffer from any significant shortages of infantry equipment.

In the 1980s, Hezbollah fighters were equipped with the weapons of the Lebanese Civil War: the AK-47, M16, H&K G3, and FN FAL rifles.

=== Anti-tank ===
Model	Type	Quantity	Acquired	Origin	Notes
RPG-7	RPG	very common	various	USSR	standard issue, includes Iranian clones and Iranian made PG-7-AT "Nader" warheads.
M72 LAW	anti-tank rocket		Captured from Israel	United States	
RPG-29	RPG		Syria	USSR	First used in November 2005.
RPG-30	RPG		Syria	Russia	possession unconfirmed
Saegre 2	ATGM		Iran	Iran	Iranian M47 Dragon clone, used in 2006 war
AT-3 Sagger	ATGM	500+	Iran	USSR	Most common Hezbollah ATGM. First used in 1992.
Raad	ATGM		Iran	USSR	Iranian Malyutka clone. Hezbollah has RAAD, SACLOS I-RAAD and SACLOS tandem-warhead I-RAAD-T variants.
9K111 Fagot	ATGM	hundreds (2006 est.)	Iran and Syria	USSR	Acquired 1995, first use in 1997.
9M113 Konkurs	ATGM	hundreds (2006 est.)	Iran and Syria	USSR	
Towsan-1	ATGM		Iran	Iran	Iranian Konkurs clone
9K115-2 Metis-M	ATGM	hundreds (2006 est.)	Syria	USSR	
9M133 Kornet	ATGM	hundreds (2006 est.)	Syria (Note: Syria has undoubtedly supplied Kornet missiles to Syria; Hezbollah claims that they have received Kornet missiles from Russia directly and Iran produces a reverse engineered clone called the "Dehlaviyeh" missile.)	Russia	
BGM-71 TOW	ATGM	unknown	unknown	United States	from Iran, perhaps pre-revolution or Iran-Contra. Built in the 1970s, "unstable". Used with night sights. Acquired 1997.
Toophan	ATGM	unknown	Iran	Iran	Iranian TOW clone acquired prior to 2002. Used in 2006 war and Syria.
MILAN	ATGM	few	Syria and black market	France	
M40	Recoilless rifle	more than in 2006		United States	about 30,000 rounds of ammunition in 2008 Includes Iranian made clones.
Type 56 recoilless rifle	recoilless rifle	not in service.	Lebanese Civil War	China	probably no longer in use
SPG-9	recoilless rifle	more than in 2006		USSR	
B-10 recoilless rifle	recoilless rifle		Lebanese Civil War	USSR	East German BRG82 copy, probably no longer in use
M67 recoilless rifle	recoilless rifle	not in service.	Lebanese Civil War	United States	probably no longer in use

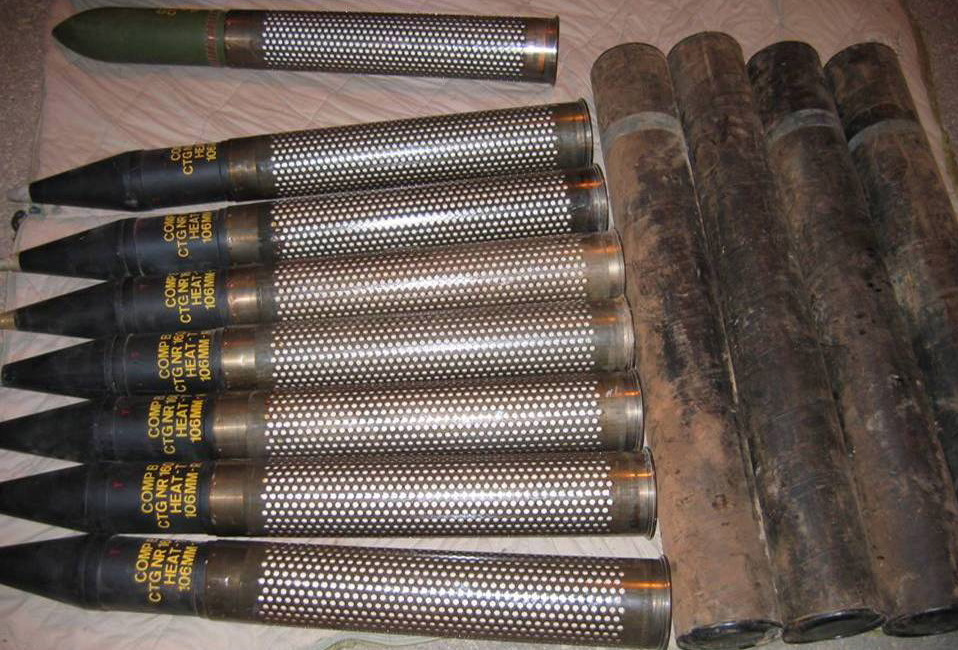
106mm munitions for an M40 recoilless rifle.

In general, Hezbollah has the most advanced and numerous anti-tank weaponry of any non-state actor, while having less advanced weapons than a normal nation state. Hezbollah is generally described as having relatively advanced anti-tank missiles and of using them with skill. Hezbollah's anti-tank weaponry is one of their defining attributes. Hezbollah's anti-tank weapons are among the most well-documented of their weaponry, but there is still disagreement over precisely which weapons are in their possession.

Hezbollah reportedly used 500 to over one thousand ATGMs in the 2006 war and has thousands in total. According to an American think tank, Hezbollah used its ATGMs with "tactical skill" and few technical errors. Hezbollah's use of anti-tank weaponry is often considered to be very successful, with Hezbollah using anti-tank weapons to "swarm" Israeli tanks, target massed infantry, and target buildings. Most Israeli casualties in the 2006 war were caused by anti-tank weapons. In addition to the quantities listed above, Hezbollah has received many unreported weapons shipments from Iran and Syria.

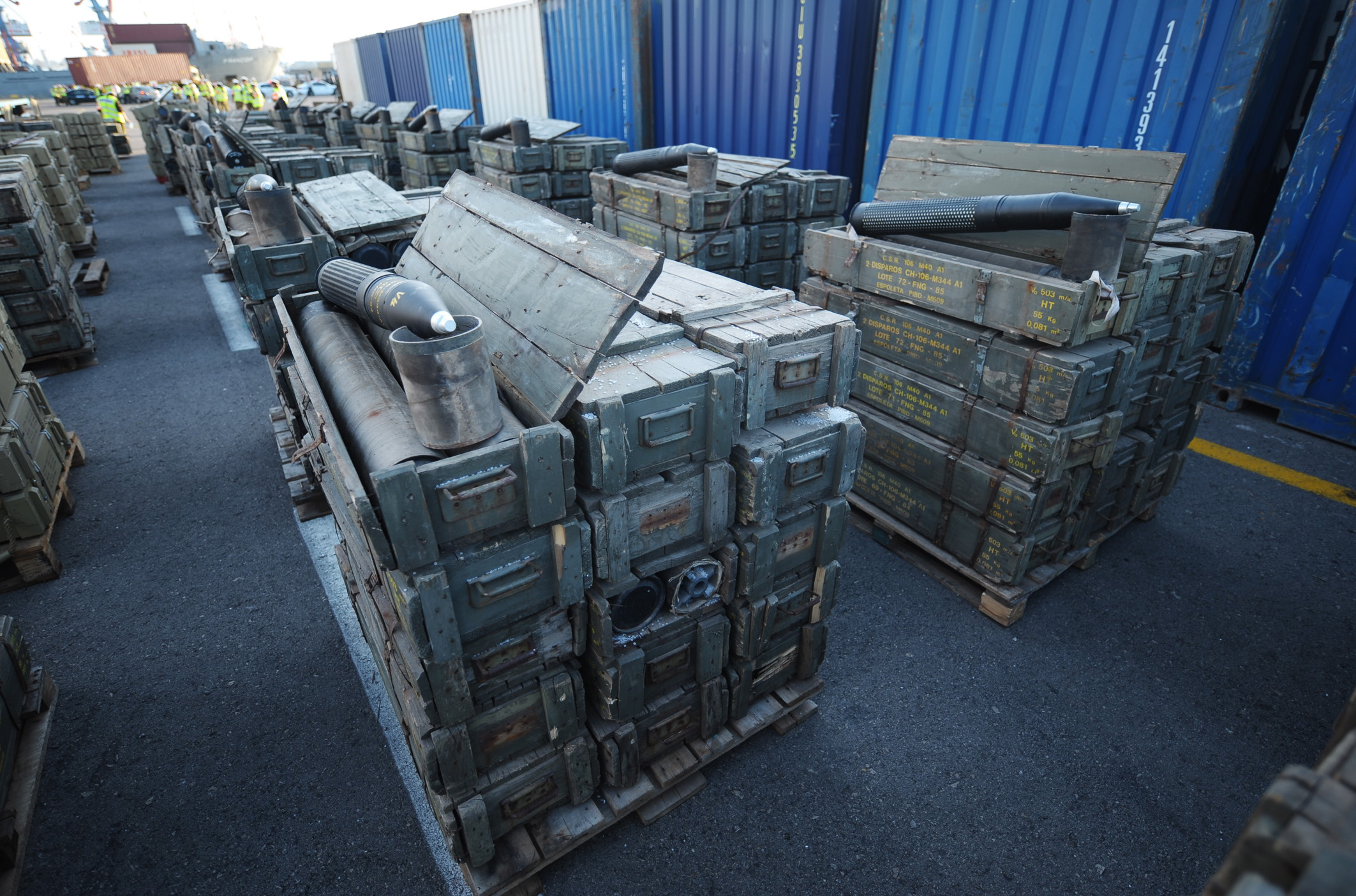
Thousands of 106 mm M40 rounds captured by the IDF

Hezbollah captured a single working Israeli Spike-MR "Gill" ATGM and launcher in the 2006 war.

=== Air defense ===
Model	Type	Quantity	Acquired	Origin	Notes
AZP S-60	Anti-aircraft gun	small numbers	Lebanon	USSR	acquired 2002 or earlier
ZU-23-2	anti-aircraft gun			USSR	
Type 55 35 mm gun	anti-aircraft gun		Lebanese Civil War	China	Probably no longer in use
ZSU-23-4	Self-propelled anti-aircraft weapon	unclear		USSR	
ZPU	anti-aircraft gun	unclear		USSR	ZPU-1 and ZPU-2 variants
KS-12A	Anti-aircraft gun	small numbers	Lebanese Civil War	USSR	Towed 85 mm WWII era anti-aircraft gun
KS-19	Anti-aircraft gun	small numbers	Lebanese Civil War	USSR	truck-mounted and used as artillery
ZSU-57-2	Self-propelled anti-aircraft gun	small numbers		USSR	
SA-7	MANPADS	unclear (Note: estimates for Hezbollah's quantity of SA-7 missiles range from "few" to at least 100 to an "enormous supply.")	Iran	USSR	Acquired 1991. Hezbollah has SA-7 and SA-7b variants. Range of SA-7 is 3200 m, and range of SA-7B is 4200 m.
SA-14	MANPADS	few (2006 est.)	Iran	USSR	reportedly fired in combat. Range of SA-14 is 4100 m.
SA-16	MANPADS	few (2006 est.)	Iran	USSR	Range of SA-16 is 5200 m.
QW-1 Vanguard	MANPADS	dozens	Syria	China	Range of QW-1 Vanguard is 5000 m.
Misagh-1	MANPADS		Iran	Iran	Iranian QW-1 variant, supplied during or after 2006 war Range of Misagh-1 is 5000 m.

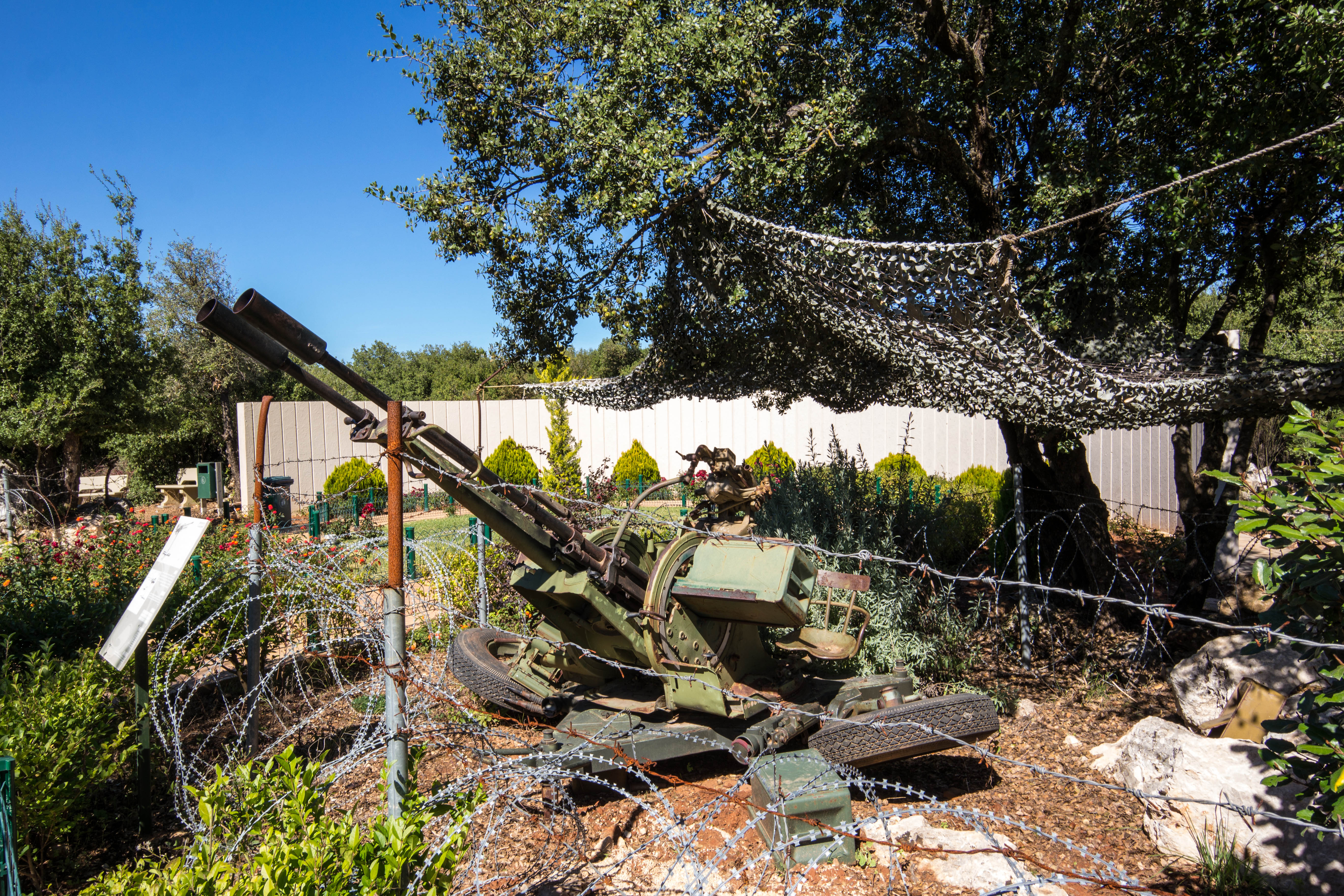
A Hezbollah ZU-23-2 anti-aircraft gun

Hezbollah's anti-aircraft guns are obsolete by decades and wholly ineffective against modern Israeli helicopters, so they are instead deployed as ground-attack artillery against Israel and insurgents in Syria. In terms of skill, Hezbollah's use of MANPADS in 2006 was less successful than Iraqi insurgents operating around the same time with similar equipment.

During 18 years of insurgency, Hezbollah shot down only one Israeli helicopter. Israel continued to easily avoid Hezbollah's air defenses during the 2006 war. Drones and strike fighters flew at altitudes of 9,000 feet or above to keep out of range of Hezbollah's missiles, while rescue helicopters and close-air support avoided fire by flying nap-of-the-earth. Hezbollah only shot down one CH-53 transport helicopter, apparently with an anti-tank missile, which was considered very light losses for the IDF.

=== Unconfirmed air defense systems ===
Model	Type	Quantity	Acquired	Origin	Notes
SA-18	MANPADS			USSR	Rumored to have been in Hezbollah's arsenal since 2002. The IAF believed Hezbollah had SA-18s in 2006 but none were fired. Possession still unconfirmed a decade later. Range of SA-18 is 5200 m.
Misagh-2	MANPADS		Iran	Iran	Iranian QW-18 variant, the QW-18 itself being a Chinese variant of the Russian/Soviet Igla. Range of Misagh-2 is 5000 m.
SA-24 Grinch Strelets	vehicle-mounted launcher		Libya (via Iran) or Syria	Russia	possession not confirmed Not man portable.
FIM-92 Stinger	MANPADS		Afghanistan (via Iran)	United States	from Afghanistan. Missiles arrived in the late 1990s but current possession is unclear Range of FIM-92 is 8000 m. Targeting is done by Infrared.
SA-2	Surface-to-air missile system		Syria	USSR	Hezbollah operatives have reported trained to use the system. Almost certainly not in Hezbollah's possession.
SA-8	Surface-to-air missile system	a few if any	Syria	USSR	possession disputed Rumored to have been in Hezbollah's possession since 2006. In 2009, Hezbollah cadres reportedly trained on the system in Syria.
SA-17	Surface-to-air missile system		Syria	USSR	Shipments of SA-17 systems reportedly stopped by Israeli air strikes, possession unknown/disputed
SA-22	Surface-to-air missile system		Iran	Russia	possession disputed
"Sayyad"	Surface-to-air missile system		Iran	Iran	Iranian MIM-23 Hawk clone, possession disputed
"Shahab Thaqeb"	Surface-to-air missile system		Iran	Iran	Iranian SAM system based on the French Crotale or Chinese HQ-7 systems, possession disputed

If Hezbollah has obtained SA-16, or especially SA-18 and SA-24 MANPADS, this would be a major hazard for the IDF. Hezbollah is believed to have pressured Iran for advanced Russian SAM systems since 2006. One study says that if Hezbollah has acquired the SA-8 system, this would pose a greater threat to Israeli helicopters and UAVs, but not to Israel's advanced F-16 and F-15 fighters.

Hezbollah operates with unusual secrecy for a fighting force, so many claims about their weapon systems can not be confirmed. In 1994, Iran's IRGC purchased Stinger missiles from the Afghan mujahideen. Iran transferred these to a Hezbollah subsidiary in Lebanon, but they were defective, so they were likely returned to seller. Iran attempted to purchase 6–10 more Stingers from other Afghan outfits, including the Northern Alliance, but it is not known whether they were successful.

=== Rockets ===
Model	Diameter (mm)	Quantity	Range (km)	Warhead (kg)	Notes
Type 63	107	at least dozens of Chinese launchers and 144 Iranian launchers, and "scores" to thousands of rockets	8.5-9	6-8	Hezbollah also uses cloned Iranian Haseb launchers, Iranian Fadjr-1 rockets and North Korean rockets. Acquired via Iran and Syria. Probably used in 2006 war.
BM-21 Grad	122	probably in the tens of thousands of rockets	range depends on variant, about 20-40	6 or 21	Hezbollah's first and most numerous rocket. Part of the Katyusha rocket launcher family. Rockets are built in Iran under the name Arash, Russia, China, Eastern Europe, North Korea and perhaps former Soviet states. Hezbollah mostly uses 9M22 HE rockets and Chinese Type-81 extended range rockets with Type-90 cluster munitions. Hezbollah also uses BM-21-P variant launcher and an unclear amount of Iranian-made 40 tube "Hadid" truck launchers. Acquired 1992 and first used in 1993. 4000 fired in 2006.
BM-27 Uragan	220	"dozens" to hundreds in 2006	40 (Note: Hezbollah's 220 mm rockets are Syrian-made and may have shorter range than original Soviet rockets.)	100	Dozens fired in 2006 war, widely agreed to have been built and supplied by Syria starting around 2002. Also known as "Raad," "Raad-2" and "Raad-3". Anti-personnel warhead. Acquired 2000s.
Oghab	230	few (Note: In 2020 Iran was estimated to have just 30 Oghab, Shahin-1, Shahin-2, Nazeat-6, and Nazeat-10 rockets in total.)	34 to ~45	65 or 70	Iranian clone of Chinese Type 83 MLRS with >500m CEP. Not used in 2006.
Fajr-3	240	"scores" to hundreds of rockets and 24-30 launchers in 2006	~43	45	Sometimes called a Katyusha rocket, acquired from Iran in early 2000 or late 1990s. Small amount used in 2006 war. Also known as "Ra'ad-1"
Falaq-1	240	hundreds-thousands?	9–10	50	from Iran, acquired early 2000s. Small amount used in 2006 war. Truck mounted.
Khaibar-1	302	perhaps dozens–hundreds in 2006	100	50 or 175	acquired 2000s and used in 2006 war possibly by the Syrian Army's 158th Missile governmentnt.
Falaq-2	333	dozens in 2006	10.8 – 11	117	from Iran, acquired after 2000. truck-mounted.
Shahin-1	333	few	13 or 75	190	Iranian liquid fueled rocket also known as "Ra'ad 1" (Note: Iran has produced many separate missiles named Raad (Persian for 'thunder'). They are generally unrelated.) and "Fajr-4." Sources disagree on whether it was used in the 2006 war. Chemical weapons capable.
Shahin-2	333	few	20-29	190	Not used in 2006. Chemical weapons capable.
Fajr-5	333	hundreds in 2006	75	75–90	Large scale deliveries began 2002 Normally fired from truck-based launchers but can be launched individually.
Naze'at 6	355.6 or 356	few	100–130?	90	not used in 2006 Uses a transporter erector launcher. Solid-fueled Iranian-made rocket. Possibly WMD capable.
Naze'at 10	450	few	125-130 or 130-150	230-240 or 250	not used in 2006
Zelzal-1	610	few	100–125	600	acquired 2002 or 2003–2004, not used in 2006. Made in Iran.
Zelzal-2	610	dozens in 2006, perhaps hundreds in 2016	200–250 to 400?	600	acquired 2002 or 2003–2004 but not used in 2006 due to airstrike damage. (Note: In the 2006 war one Zelzal-2 rocket was apparently ignited by accident; it did not reach Israel.) Also known as Mushak-200.

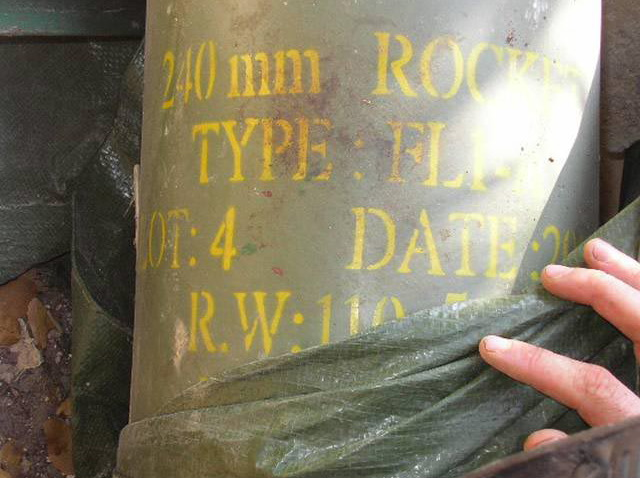
A Hezbollah Falaq-1 or Fajr-3 rocket captured by the IDF in 2006

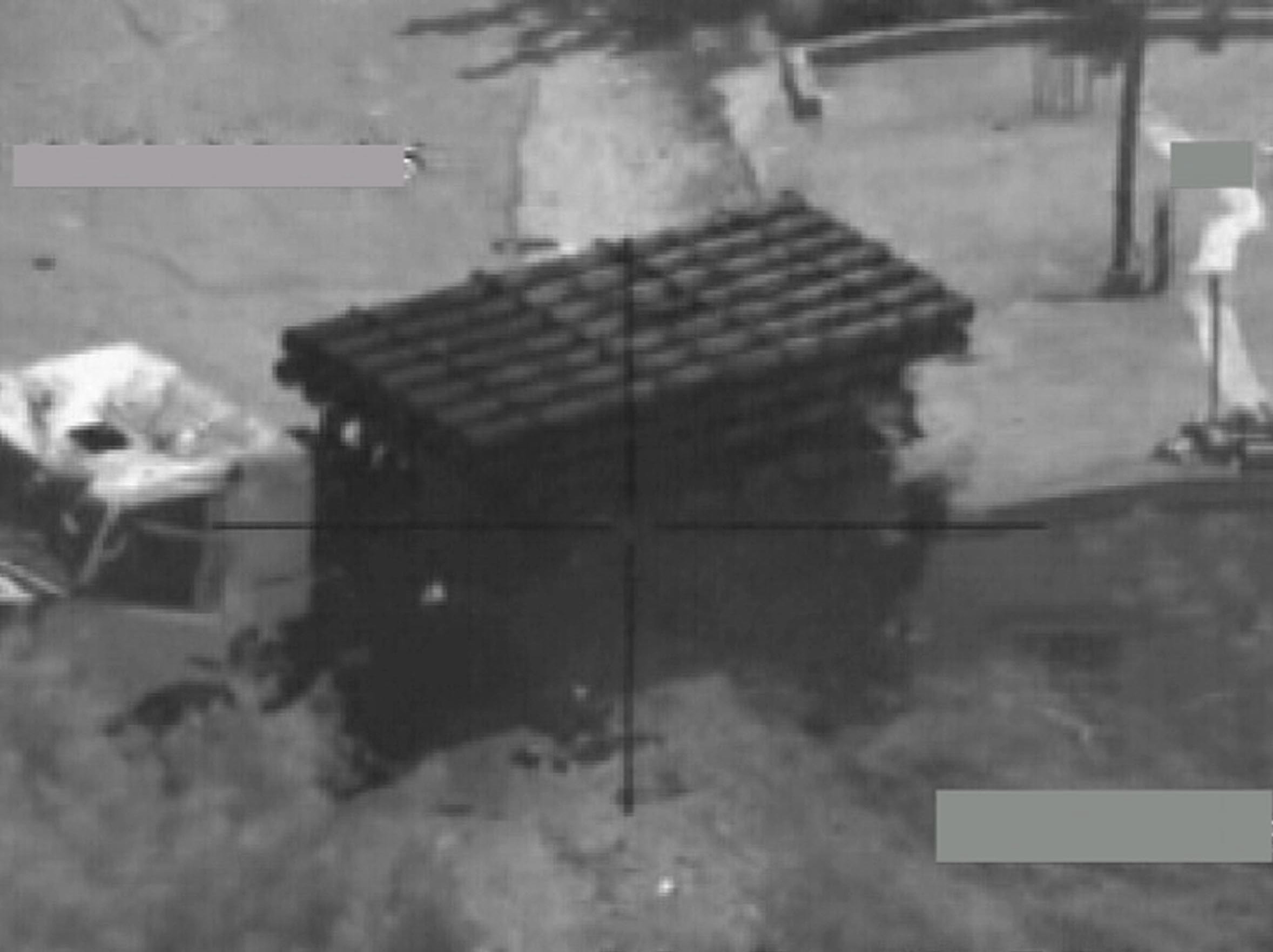
Hezbollah BM-21 Grad "Katyusha" rocket launcher

There is great uncertainty regarding the many variations and names of Iran and Syria's rocket artillery systems, as well as which systems have been transferred to Hezbollah. A number of Hezbollah rockets contain cluster munitions, though Hezbollah denies this. Because rockets may have interchangeable warheads, exact weight and range can vary slightly.

Most of Hezbollah's rockets are short range Katyusha rockets, which refers not to a specific model but is a general term for short-range unguided rockets fired in large quantities from trucks. The term "Katyusha" is usually used to refer to 122 mm BM-21 rockets, and sometimes includes BM-27 Uragan and Fajr-3 rockets as well. In addition to their Katyushas, Hezbollah has "thousands" of medium-range rockets like the Fajr-3 and Fajr-5 and "hundreds" of long-range rockets.

Although Hezbollah's long range rockets can be based farther from the border and threaten more of Israel, they require large truck-based Transporter erector launchers that are very vulnerable to air strikes. Hezbollah's long range rockets were top priority targets for the IAF in the 2006 war. The IAF destroyed 18 of 19 to 21 of Hezbollah's Zelzal launchers, and Hezbollah never used the rocket during the war. Similarly, the group lost over half of their medium-range Fajr-3 and Fajr-5 rockets in the first hour of the war.

Considering that Hezbollah invested enormous effort in acquiring these rockets, their almost total destruction in the war represented a major failure. Hezbollah has since reportedly buried their rockets in rough mountain regions of Lebanon farther from the Israeli border, which could complicate IAF efforts to find and destroy them. Hezbollah mostly fires BM-21 rockets individually, but sometimes fires them in groups.

There is some evidence that Hezbollah indigenously builds IRAM rockets, combining the rocket of a 107 mm munition with the warhead of a Falaq-1 rocket, which are informally called "Volcano" rockets. These are particularly used in Syria. Many Hezbollah rockets are stored underground in a "ready-to-fire" mode. There is no consensus on how many rockets Hezbollah has in total, and while estimates of around 150,000 are commonly repeated, Jane's calls this propaganda. There is agreement that Hezbollah's rocket force is extremely large and has expanded substantially in the last decade.

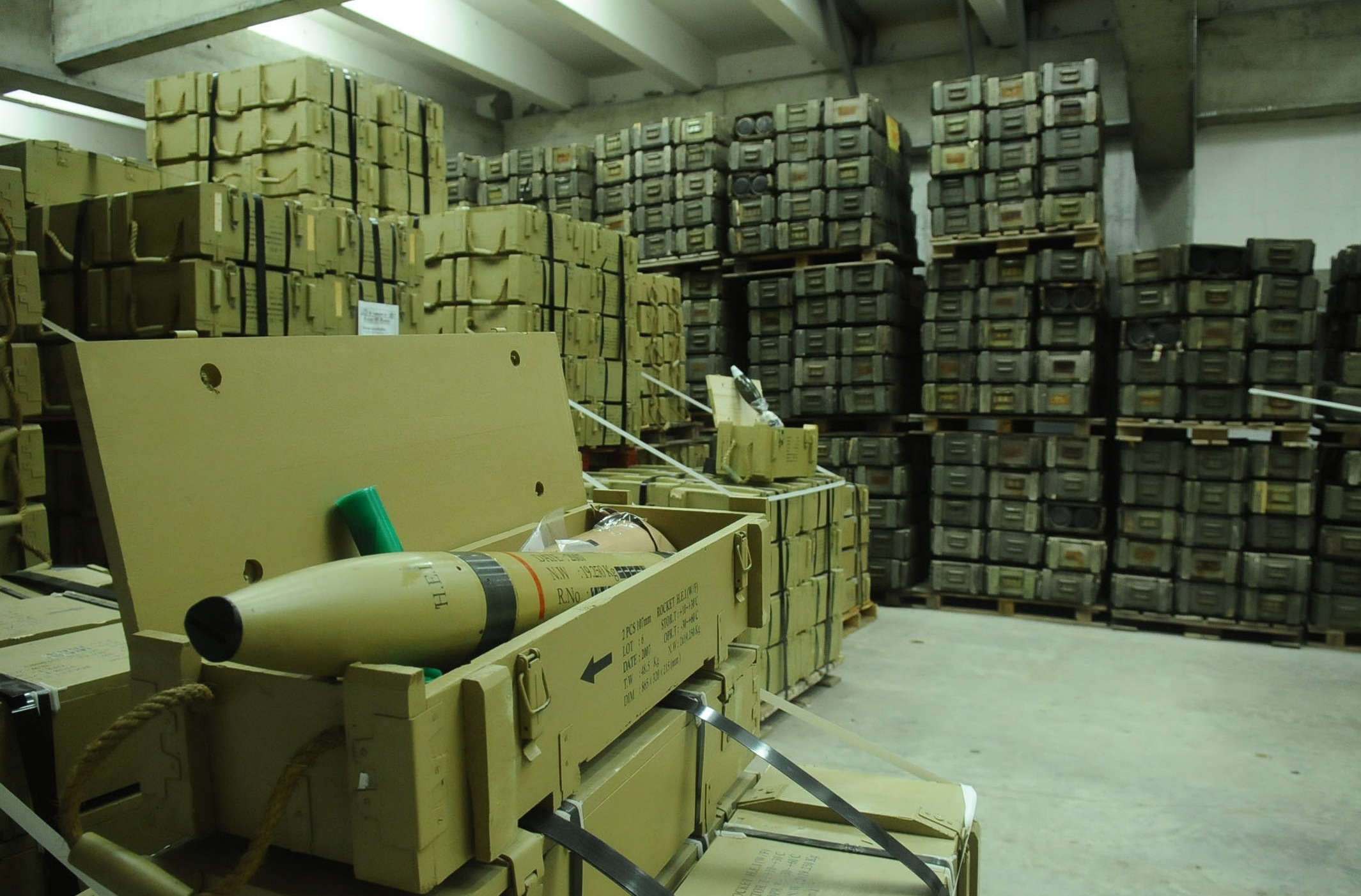
In 2009 the IDF interdicted 2,124 107 mm Fajr-1 artillery rockets on a cargo ship bound for Hezbollah.

Hezbollah's rocket force is a strategic, not tactical weapon, intended not to achieve battlefield effects but to harm Israel's sense of security and quality-of-life. The main impact is not the physical destruction but the way that rocket fire affects the lives of Israel's population and causes people to flee northern Israel. As one observer dryly noted in the 1990s, "When a Katyusha falls on somebody's house, it is hard to tell them this is going well." In this sense, it functions as a deterrent, and is Hezbollah's main means of leveraging a favorable outcome to a war against Israel.

Hezbollah's rocket strategy of using rockets against Israel is broadly similar to Hamas's strategy. Hezbollah's rocket arsenal is of higher quality and quantity than Hamas's, and Hezbollah's daily rate of fire is about four times higher. Hezbollah's rocket stock grew tenfold between 2006 and 2015. In a future war with Israel, estimates for the number of rockets fired per day range from 500 to over 1,000, with a higher opening blow in the initial stages of the conflict.

Estimates of Hezbollah's overall number of rockets vary, but high end estimates are around 150,000 thousand rockets. In 2002, Hezbollah had about 8,000 to 9,000 rockets. In 2006, Western intelligence sources believed Hezbollah had about 12,000 rockets, a number also claimed by Hezbollah leader Hassan Nasrallah. Hezbollah had about 12–13,000 rockets on the eve of the 2006 war, of which 11,000 were supplied via Iran. About 100 were from the medium-range Fajr series. In 2018, the deputy defense minister, Eliyahu Ben Dahan, estimated the organization had more than 120,000 missiles.

There is no evidence the Zelzal-3, a minor upgrade of the Zelzal-2 unguided artillery rocket, has been acquired by Hezbollah. (Note: A number of sources confuse the Zelzal-3 artillery rocket with the much larger Shahab-3 ballistic missile.) Similarly, despite speculation to the contrary, there is no evidence that the Fateh-313 missile has been transferred to Hezbollah. There is no evidence Hezbollah has been supplied with more Zelzal missiles since the 2006 war. Some sources say Hezbollah has acquired 300 mm BM-30 "Smerch" rockets.

=== Missiles ===
Model	Diameter (mm)	Quantity	Range (km)	Warhead (kg)	Notes
Fateh-110	610 or 616	dozens-hundreds?	about 200	450	Solid-fueled guided missile. Apparently includes Syrian-built M600 variant and OEM Iranian-made Fateh-110 missiles. Not owned in 2006. Fateh-110A, M600, and Fateh-110 fourth generation variants have been reported.
Scud	880	0-10	700	500	Delivery disputed. Model also disputed, with North Korean Hwasong-7s Scud-Cs, or Scud-Ds often cited. Supplied by Syria in 2010.

Since missiles, unlike rockets, are guided, they represent a major increase in warfighting capacity. While unguided rockets are terror weapons aimed at large civilian areas to inflict fear, missiles can be targeted towards specific infrastructure or locations. Analysts say that in a war, Hezbollah would likely use their missiles to target Israeli military targets, critical infrastructure, and airports. Hezbollah had no guided missiles during the 2006 war. Hezbollah has reportedly used ballistic missiles in combat in Yemen against Saudi Arabia, which has allowed them to improve and test missile payload and guidance systems.

Whether or not Hezbollah has acquired Scud missiles is a subject of dispute, as is the types of the Scuds supplied, the dates the missiles were purportedly delivered, and the quantity, and there is no consensus on whether missiles were delivered. The London Times reported in 2011 that Hezbollah received 10 Scud missiles from Syria in two batches. Hiding a Scud missile would be hard, and would probably require a large underground complex. Since Scud missiles are much larger and more complicated than M600 missiles, their only real use would be as psychological weapons to threaten all of Israel or to attack Israel's nuclear facilities in Dimona. Still, some sources suggest Hezbollah has acquired a very small number of Scud missiles. Journalist Robert Fisk and UNIFIL say that Hezbollah has not received Scuds.

Nasrallah has suggested in statements that Hezbollah has Iranian-made M600 missiles, and most analysts and the IDF believe that Hezbollah has acquired at least some M600 missiles. Hezbollah regularly claims to have weapons that will "surprise" its enemies,

=== Mortars and artillery ===
Model	Type	Quantity	Acquired	Origin	Notes
60 mm mortars	mortar				Probably HM 12
81 mm mortars	mortar		Lebanese Civil War perhaps		including M29 mortar.
106 mm mortars	mortar				
120 mm mortars	mortar				including the Razm mortar and the HM 16 "Hadid" mortar
Type 56 mortar	160 mm mortar	10	Unknown, possibly Iran	China	
2S1 Gvozdika	Self-propelled howitzer	3 or more	Syria	USSR	Operated in Syria.
M-30	Artillery piece		Captured from SLA	USSR	Perhaps no longer in use.
D-30	Artillery piece		Captured from SLA	USSR	Truck mounted
M-46	Artillery piece	2 in the late 1990s		USSR	seen in use in 2017

Hezbollah has a relatively limited amount of mortars and artillery weapons. Hezbollah used mortars to shell IDF and SLA outposts during the insurgency period, and captured some artillery pieces during the Lebanese Civil War and the collapse of the SLA militia. Hezbollah acquired and used more artillery pieces in the ongoing Syrian Civil War. Hezbollah's mortars, like most of the rest of their equipment, are supplied by Iran and Syria.

Between 1995 and 2002, The Iranian Revolutionary Guards claim to have equipped Hezbollah with 400 short- and medium-range artillery pieces. The Israeli think tank MEMRI makes a different estimate, saying that Hezbollah received four hundred short- and medium-range artillery pieces between 1992 and 2005.

Assessment of Hezbollah's indirect-fire ability varies. Some studies say that indirect fire is a Hezbollah weakness, while others say that Hezbollah's indirect fire deserves "high marks" and the LA Times claims that Hezbollah has "well-trained artillerymen." Hezbollah's fire discipline is reportedly much better than that of Palestinian groups. A US Army publication explains this disagreement by saying that although some indirect fire support components like mortar marksmanship were strong, Hezbollah was rarely able to mass indirect fire and, overall, Hezbollah was "far short of contemporary Western standards." Iran has transferred to Hezbollah some old artillery-fire control, targeting, and damage assessment systems. Hezbollah artillery participated in the battle of Salma, the battle of Zabadani, and the Battle of al-Qusayr along with other groups' artillery.

=== Armoured vehicles ===
Model	Type	Quantity	Acquired	Origin	Notes
T-54	Main battle tank	small amounts	Syria	USSR	Mostly T-54A variant.
T-55	Main battle tank	dozens?	Syria and South Lebanon Army	USSR	
T-62	Main battle tank	small amounts	Syria	USSR	Mostly T-62 Obr. 1972 variant, operated in Syria.
T-72	Main battle tank	approximately 60	Syria	USSR	Operated in Syria, including some T-72AV and T-72M1 variants. Principal main battle tank.
BMP-1	Infantry fighting vehicle	5 or more	Syria	USSR	Mostly operated in Syria.
BMP-2	Infantry fighting vehicle		Syria	USSR	Operated in Syria.
M113	Armored personnel carrier	A small number, 4 or more	captured from Israel-backed South Lebanon Army	United States	Israel says that these vehicles were pilfered from the Lebanese Armed Forces, a claim that has been widely rejected.
BTR-152	Armored personnel carrier		South Lebanon Army	USSR	Captured
BTR-50	Armored personnel carrier		South Lebanon Army	USSR	Captured
BRDM-2	Armoured personnel carrier	a few	Lebanese Civil War and/or Syria	USSR	Used in Syria.
R-330P 'Piramida-I'	Electronic warfare vehicle	small numbers, at least 2	Syria	USSR	Obscure EW vehicle based on MT-LBu platform, operated in Syria.
All-terrain vehicle		dozens?	various	various	
Safir	Jeep	dozens – hundreds	Iran	Iran	Operated in Syria.
M825	Jeep		Lebanese Civil War	United States	Used in 1989 conflict with Amal. No longer in service.

Although there are reports of Hezbollah sporadically capturing tanks and armored personnel carriers in the 1980s and 1990s, Hezbollah did not start to seriously operate armored vehicles until its involvement in the Syrian Civil War. Since Hezbollah was operating against non-state actors and had air superiority, using heavy weapons and vehicles made tactical sense. However, Hezbollah's armored vehicles are universally described as far inferior to the IDF's, and would not be useful in a war against Israel.

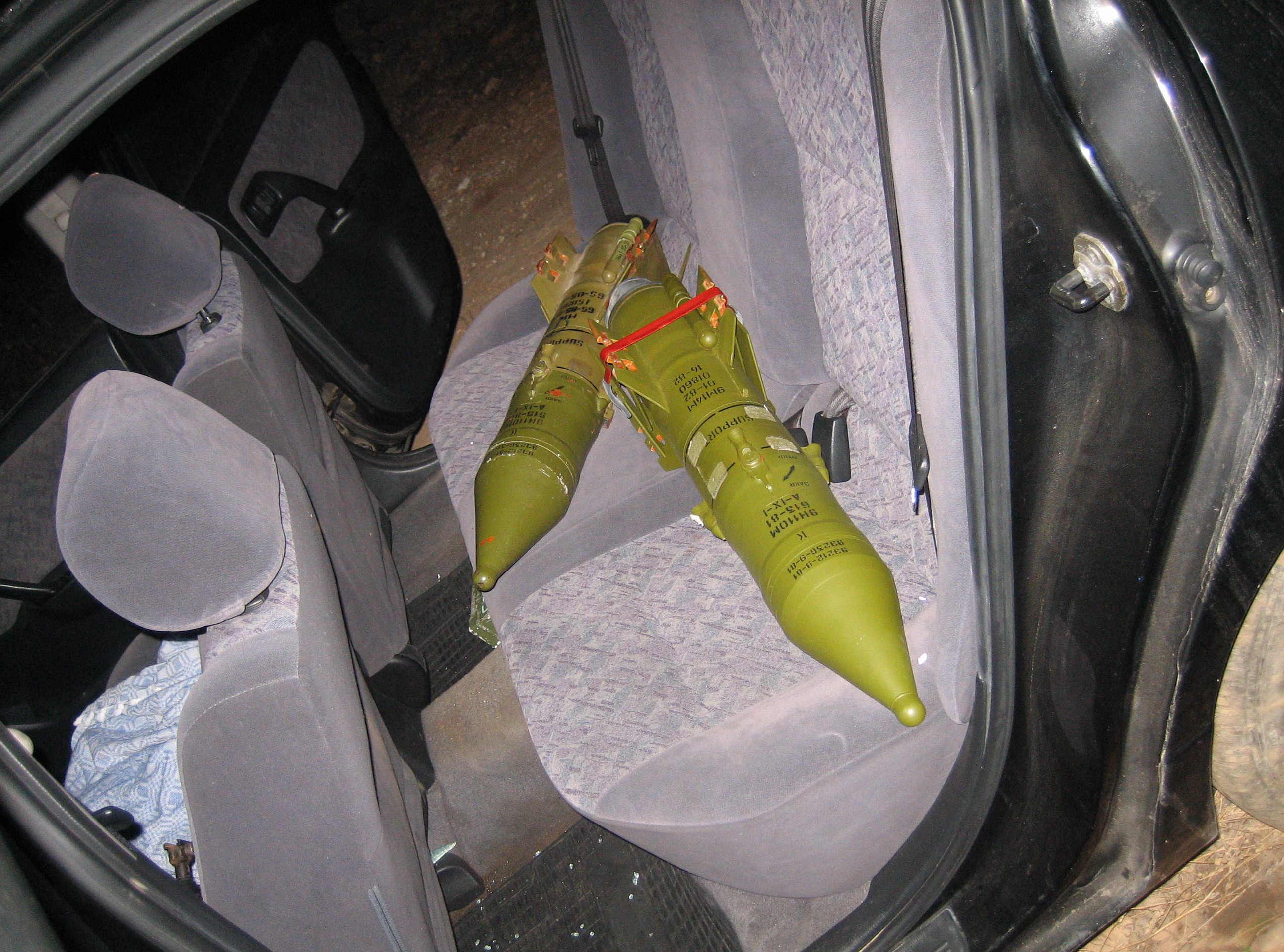
Hezbollah AT-3 Sagger missiles being transported in a civilian car

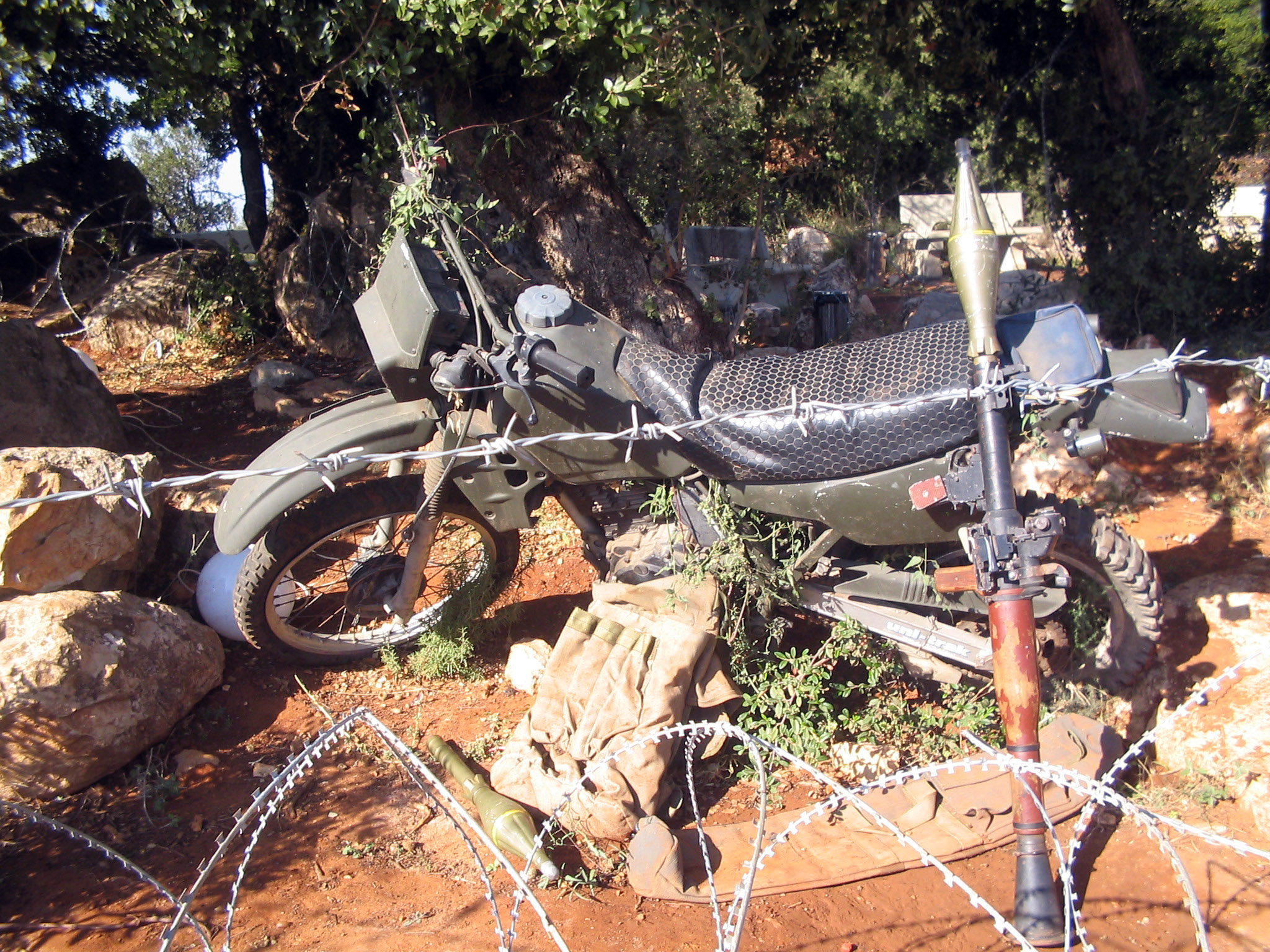
A Kawasaki KDX 250 motorbike used by Hezbollah

Hezbollah fighters and operatives use civilian vehicles systemically for day-to-day transport and combat. Hezbollah's logistics teams transport arms and ammunition in pickup trucks, while individuals commonly use dirt bikes for off-road travel. Once arriving at a battlefield, Hezbollah fighters generally discard their vehicles and fight on foot. Israel has accused Hezbollah of using ambulances and Red Cross vehicles to move weaponry, which is a war crime.

=== Naval assets ===
Model	Type	Quantity	Acquired	Origin	Notes
Noor	Anti-ship missile	8+ or "undisclosed"	Iran	China	Iranian C-802 Silkworm clone, sometimes described as Chinese-made. Acquired early 2000s.
Yakhont	Anti-ship missile	up to 12	Syria	Russia	delivered 2013 possession disputed
Zodiac	Inflatable boat				

On 14 July 2006, Hezbollah forces fired a C-802 anti-ship missile at the Israeli corvette INS Hanit, killing four sailors and inflicting substantial damage. A second missile missed its target and destroyed a civilian merchant vessel. (Note: Due to fog of war this was also reported as a C-701 missile or an anti-ship UAV.) Sources disagree on whether the missile used was an OEM Chinese-made missile or an Iranian-made clone. Sources disagree on who was responsible for firing the missiles, with Hezbollah, the Syrian Army, or the Islamic Revolutionary Guard Corps being implicated. Iran denied involvement in the incident (Note: A few contemporary sources say that the attack was likely conducted by Hezbollah alone.) while others disagree.

In 2006, Israel destroyed ten Lebanese Armed Forces radar stations along the coast, possibly because Hezbollah gained access to them to launch anti-ship missiles. In a 25 May 2010 speech, Hassan Nasrallah promised to attack Israeli naval ships and Israel-bound commercial shipping. Some have speculated that Hezbollah has semi-submersibles, swimmer delivery vehicles, or even submarines, though these are not confirmed.

There are disputed reports that Hezbollah has acquired large, advanced Yakhont anti-ship missiles from Syria, by smuggling them into Lebanon in parts.

In the 1990s, Hezbollah established an amphibious warfare unit that trains in Lebanon and Iran. Little is known about it.

=== Unmanned aerial vehicles ===
Model	Type	Quantity	Acquired	Origin	Notes
Mohajer-4	Unmanned aerial vehicle	8	Iran	Iran	
Mohajer-2	Unmanned aerial vehicle		Iran	Iran	
Ababil-2	Unmanned aerial vehicle	estimates range from 12 to 24–30 in 2006	Iran	Iran	Two shot down by Israel in 2006. Includes Ababil-T loitering munition variant.
Yasir	Unmanned aerial vehicle	unknown	Iran	United States	Iranian ScanEagle clone, possession unconfirmed.
DJI Phantom	UAV		commercial off-the-shelf	China	Civilian drone either unarmed and used for surveillance or weaponized with Chinese MZD-2 sub-munitions.
Karrar	Unmanned aerial vehicle	at least four	Iran	Iran	Iranian MQM-107 derivative reportedly operated in Syria. Acquired c. 2010.
DJI Matrice 600	Unmanned aerial vehicle		COTS	China	Weaponized civilian drone.

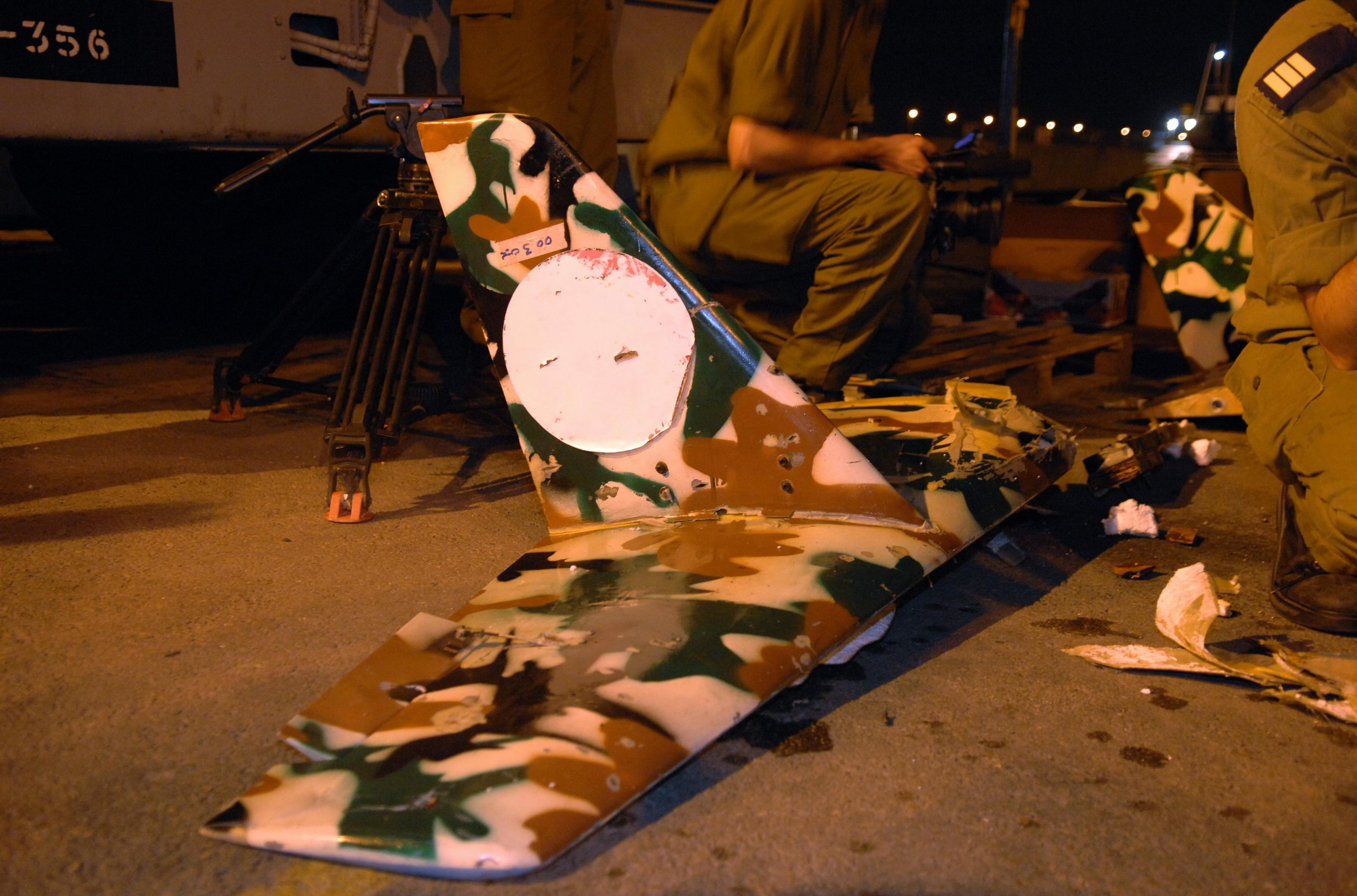
Remnants of shot-down Hezbollah UAV

Like many of its other weapons systems, Hezbollah's UAV capacity is more advanced than any other non-state actor, while being much less capable than a typical nation state. In particular, Hezbollah's UAV systems are much inferior in both quantity and capability to Israel's. Hezbollah operates both military drones, believed to be acquired from Iran, and improvised commercial off-the-shelf models. There is substantial disagreement over what models and quantities of drones Hezbollah possesses. Hezbollah has no manned aircraft.

Hezbollah first acquired UAVs in 2002 and their first known use of a drone came on November 7, 2004. Hezbollah has continued to use UAV technology. The organization used drones in the 2006 Lebanon War and lost several. Since 2014, Hezbollah drones have also been involved in reconnaissance over the porous Lebanese-Syrian border. Hezbollah has demonstrated weaponized civilian drones, and claims to have first used them in September 2014. In 2015 Hezbollah was using COTS quadrocopter UAVs to spot artillery fire in Syria, the party's first intensive use of drones.

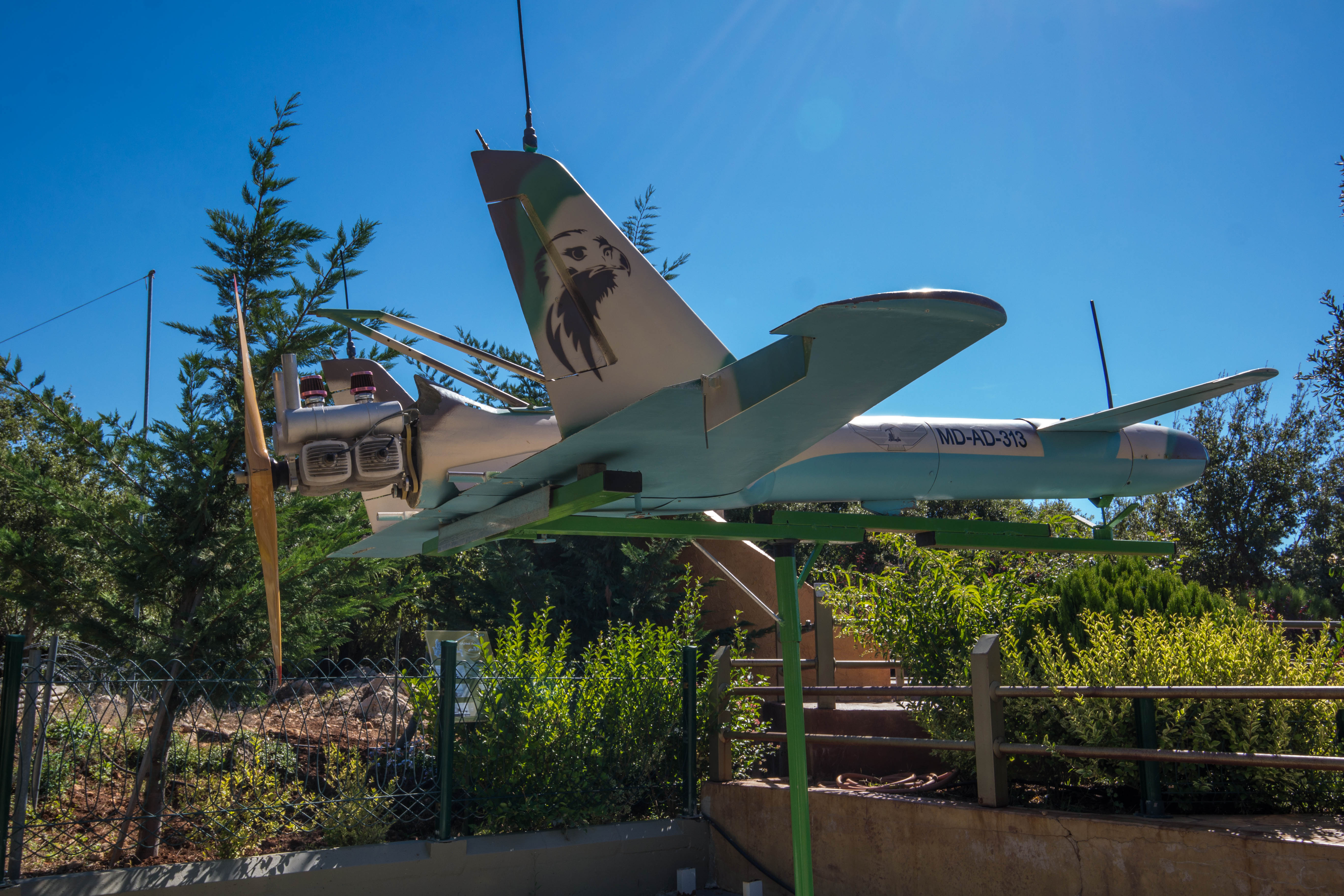
A Hezbollah Ababil UAV

Estimates for Hezbollah's total number of drones range from more than 10 to "dozens" to almost 200, not counting commercial civilian drones. In 2006, the group claimed to have 50 trained drone pilots. Hezbollah drones of disputed model, known as the Mirsad-1 and either an Abadil-2 or Mohajer-4 model, violated Israeli airspace in November 2004 and April 2005. Hezbollah operates Abidil-2 UAVs in several models, including communications, the Qasef-1 loitering munition, and strategic intelligence. The group does not have Abadil-2 drones for tactical surveillance. In 2014 or 2015, Hezbollah built a 2,200-foot unpaved runway in the northern Bekaa Valley, probably to use for UAVs in Syria. There is speculation that Hezbollah has acquired the Shahed 129 UAV.

Hezbollah has used manned paragliders or powered parachutes. Little is known about this.

=== Hezbollah and weapons of mass destruction ===
There is no evidence Hezbollah has acquired chemical, biological, or nuclear weapons. Hassan Nasrallah has spoken against WMDs and IDF sources say Hezbollah has not acquired chemical weapons. There has been much speculation and concern about Hezbollah's potential acquisition of chemical weapons, particularly given the state collapse in nearby Syria.

A 2013 article says that if Hezbollah acquired biological weapons from Syria, its existing UAVs would likely provide a viable delivery mechanism. In 2008, the George Bush administration assessed that Hezbollah was possibly capable of carrying out a terror attack with chemical, biological or low-grade nuclear weapons.

=== Fiber optic drones ===
Hezbollah utilized fiber optic drones during the 2026 Lebanon war within the Hezbollah–Israel conflict.

== Intelligence gathering ==
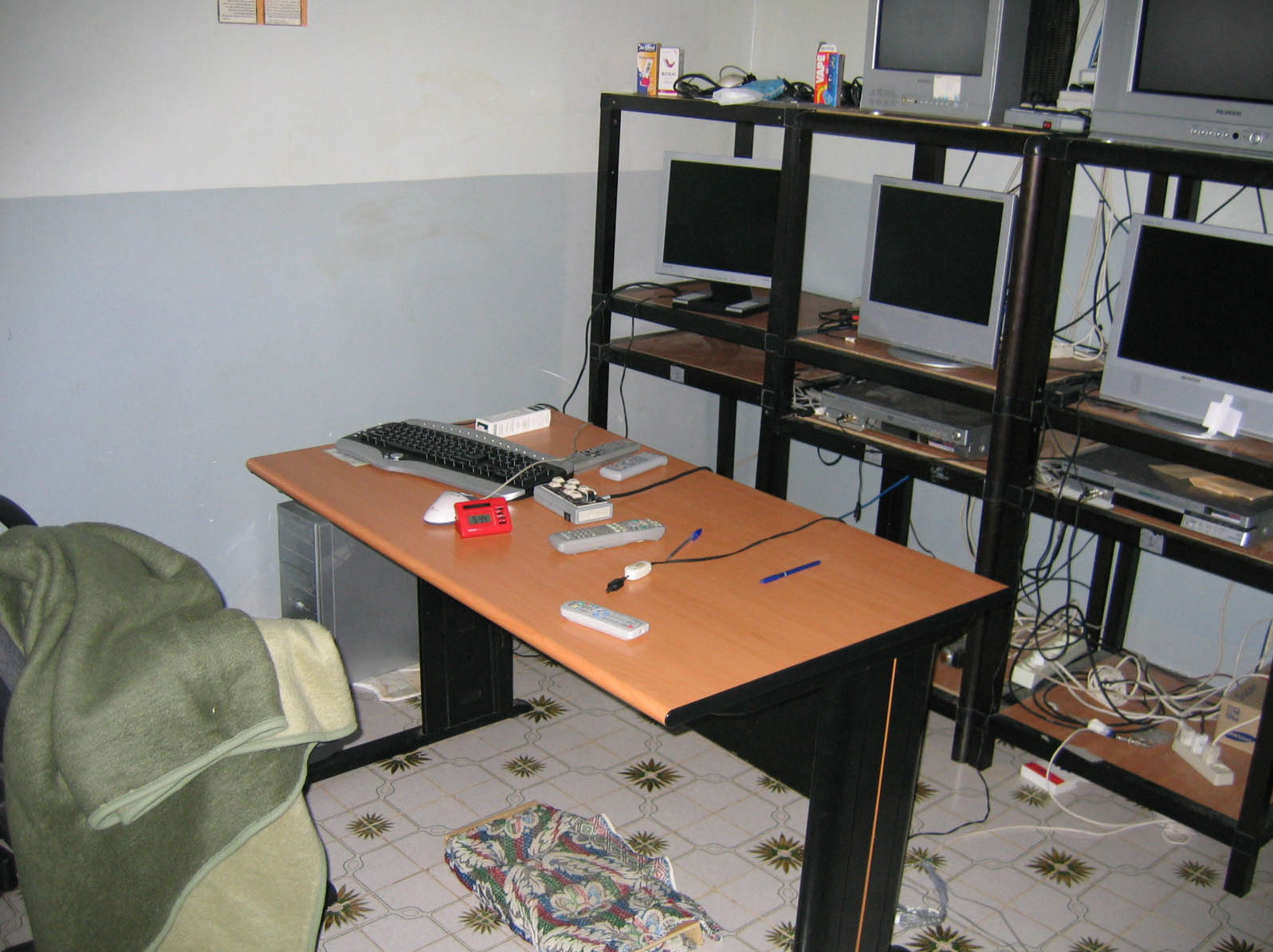
A station for viewing surveillance footage

Hezbollah maintains a capable and large intelligence apparatus responsible for intelligence, counter-intelligence, and internal supervision. Hezbollah's intelligence organization was formed in the Bekaa Valley in the summer of 1982 and was originally modeled off the Jihaz al-Razd, the Fatah security apparatus, and the Amal's security apparatus. Originally clan-based, the intelligence service developed into a larger, more state-like organization and expanded in scope as Hezbollah grew.

Hostile penetrations by Hezbollah have increased over time. Hezbollah's intelligence agency has been claimed to have penetrated or tried to penetrate Salafist and Islamist groups, Palestinian groups, the Syrian government, and Syrian and Iraqi Shiite militias. Hezbollah reportedly has access to the LAF's military intelligence in addition to their own.

Hezbollah has SIGINT, HUMINT, and IMINT capabilities.

Hezbollah has dedicated SIGINT personnel. In 2006, Hezbollah SIGINT personnel reportedly managed to triangulate the positions of some cell phones used by the IDF. Hezbollah's SIGINT section is reportedly the most secretive and well-trained part of the organization, and little is known of it. Its capabilities have improved since 2006 and it receives extensive state support in equipment and electronics from Iran.

In 2006, Hezbollah's intelligence capacity and Iranian help gave them an "extraordinary understanding of Israel's military strategy", which was critical to successfully fighting the war. Hezbollah had "good tactical intelligence" and knew the IDF's commanders, likely routes of advance through Lebanon, and tactics. Hezbollah's intelligence network in Israel remains heavily focused on identifying targets for rockets. Hezbollah's internal security apparatus is headquartered in Dahieh, Beirut. Hezbollah has influence within the government of Lebanon's security services. Since 2000, Hezbollah has focused on acquiring, via public reporting and spies, a database of Israeli civilian and military infrastructure to target with rocket artillery in the event of war.

Nasrallah's security detail is handled separately from Hezbollah's intelligence apparatus. The professionalism of Nasrallah's bodyguards has reportedly increased in the last few years but is still unimpressive and lackluster.

=== Counterintelligence ===
Hezbollah has a counterintelligence apparatus composed of two organs: the "Amn al-Muddad" (encounter security) and Amn al-Hizb (party security). The group's counterintelligence capability has improved over time. The counterintelligence organization contains a "combat unit" that became active around 2004.

Between 2000 and 2006, Hezbollah improved particularly in counter-signals intelligence, or removing Israeli electronic spying devices, and "turning" Israeli agents.

== Electronic warfare ==
Hezbollah has demonstrated a limited ability to tap fibre optic cables, intercept data and hijack Internet and communication connections. In 2006, Hezbollah "reportedly had the assets in place to jam parts of Israel's radar and communications systems."

Hezbollah's communication network continued to function even in the most battered strongholds in southern Lebanon in 2006. After four weeks of war, the network still operated just 500 meters from the Israeli border. Iranian electronic warfare specialists assisted in the development of the network and supplied advanced Iranian equipment. This included "eavesdropping devices, computers and modern communications equipment." Hezbollah has a department responsible for countering Israeli electronic warfare, particularly by discouraging the use of non-secure equipment.

An Israeli source says that in 2006, "Hezbollah's commanders were keenly mindful of Israeli SIGINT capabilities and were scrupulously careful to maintain their own high level of communications security and encryption," which significantly challenged IDF intelligence. Hezbollah also claimed that they tapped into encrypted Israeli radio networks, but this is "almost surely" wrong.

On 17 March 2026, several media networks Nida Al-Watan, MTV reported they were targeted by hacking attempts linked to Hezbollah. The networks were accused of being anti-Hezbollah, providing the Israeli army with coordinates, for bombing areas in Beirut's southern suburbs. Journalists received personal threats on their devices and they were even reports that claimed there were calls to shoot reporters affiliated to Nida Al-Watan and MTV, with a reward of up to $1000.

== Media and propaganda ==
For decades, media have played a critical role in Hezbollah's military strategy. Hezbollah takes the role of media very seriously and expends great effort bringing news of its fighting activities to its constituents and to the world at large. Hezbollah's media activities mainly happen through Hezbollah's newspapers, Hezbollah's al-Manar television station, and Hezbollah's Radio Nour.

== See also ==
- List of extrajudicial killings and political violence in Lebanon
