= List of military equipment manufactured in Iran =

In recent years, the Iranian government states that it has self-sufficiency in essential military hardware and defense systems.

Iran established an arms development program during the Iran–Iraq War to counter the weapons embargo imposed on it by the U.S. and its Western allies. Since 1993, Iran has manufactured its own tanks, armored personnel carriers, missiles, radars, boats, submarines, unmanned aerial vehicles, and fighter planes.

== History ==
From 1925 to the Iranian Revolution in 1979, Iran used to be equipped with the very latest Western hardware. Cases exist where Iran was supplied with equipment even before it was made standard in the countries that developed it (for example the US F-14 Tomcat, or the British Chieftain Tank). Primary suppliers included the United States, Britain, France, the Federal Republic of Germany (West Germany), Italy, Israel, and the Soviet Union.

The Iran–Iraq War, and post revolutionary sanctions at the time had a dramatic effect on Iran's inventory of western equipment. Under the pressures of war, all supplies were quickly exhausted and replacements became increasingly difficult to come by. The war eventually forced Iran to turn to the Soviet Union, North Korea, Brazil, and China to meet its short-term military requirements. Nevertheless, the experience of using quality equipment was not lost on any of the branches of the Iranian armed forces. Disappointed by the older Warsaw Pact equipment, Iran sought to develop its own ability to mirror the technology of its likely enemies, and to provide a totally reliable source of equipment for the future.

After the Iranian revolution, developments in military technology were carried out with the technical support of Russia, China, and North Korea; building upon the foundations established by western contractors. Iranian reliance on these countries has rapidly decreased over the last decade in most sectors as Iran sought to gain total independence; A major exception however, is the aerospace sector, where Iran is still dependent on external help. Iran has, at present, reverse engineered existing foreign hardware, adapted it to their own requirements and then mass-produced the finished product. Examples of this abound, such as the Boragh and the IAMI Azarakhsh. In an attempt to make its military industries more sustainable Iran has also sought to export its military products, see Iranian Military Exports.

== Defense production ==
This illustration shows a prototype of Iran's mobile air defense system, Bavar 373, with cylindrical containers. However, the final product unveiled in 2016, is equipped with cube containers.

The following list consists of some weapons systems that Iran manufactures domestically:

=== Aircraft ===
- Azarakhsh – modified copy of U.S. F-5 Freedom Fighter, one-seat fighter aircraft, and combat-capable trainer.
- Bavar 2 – fixed-wing seaplane capable of patrol and reconnaissance missions.
- Chakavak (plane) – ultralight training-reconnaissance planes
- Dorna – training aircraft
- Fajr F.3 – Indigenous trainer aircraft
- HESA IrAn-140 – licensed production of Ukrainian Antonov An-140
- HESA Kowsar – fourth-generation fighter jet
- HESA Simourgh – light military transport aircraft
- HESA Yasin – training aircraft
- IRIAF Parastu-14 – propeller-driven training aircraft. Reverse engineered Beech F33 Bonanza.
- JT2-2 Tazarv – third generation of the Dorna mentioned above. Still in prototype stage.
- Saeqeh – fighter aircraft. Second generation Azarakhsh with a twin canted tail configuration.
- Shafaq – advanced light fighter/trainer, still in development.
- Simorgh – training aircraft. (Upgraded F-5B)
- Tizro – training aircraft
- Qaher-313 – Stealth single-seat multi-role combat aircraft.

=== Helicopters ===
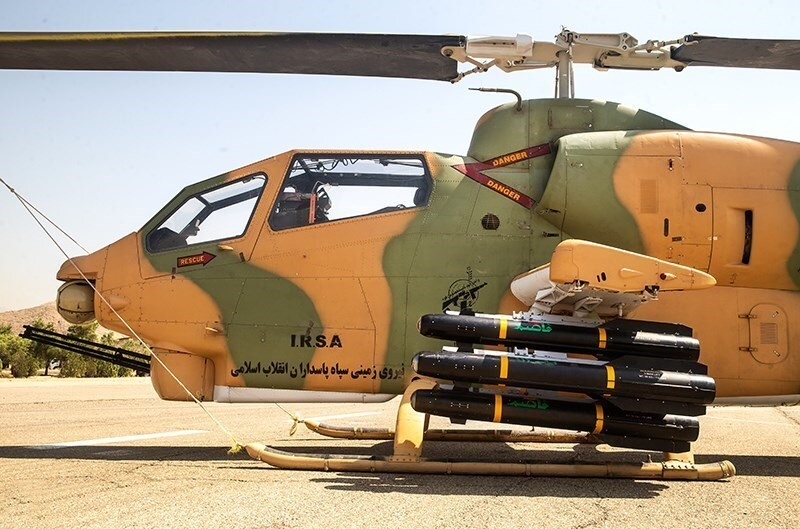
Toufan II Attack Helicopter

Panha 2091 – overhauled U.S. AH-1J SeaCobra refitted with indigenous components.

- 209 (Comprehensive and integrated missile system of helicopter 209); It can fire all types of helicopter air-based missiles with the nature of Fire and Forget, which is installed and operational on the Kabri attack helicopters.
- Bell 214 – Reverse engineered and built in Iran
- HESA Shahed 278 – Developed from Bell 206 & Panha Shabaviz 2061
- HESA Shahed 285 – New Iranian Designed Attack Helicopter
- Homa - similar to Bell 412EP it is powered by reverse-engineered twin-engine Pratt & Whitney Canada PT6T-3D Twin-Pac. The helicopter can seat 14 people and fly in different weathers.
- Shabaviz 275 – overhauled U.S. Bell 205 JetRanger refitted with indigenous components
- Shabaviz 2061 – overhauled U.S. Bell 206 JetRanger refitted with indigenous components.
- Saba 248 – medium-weight, double-engine, quadrotor aircraft, capable of carrying eight occupants
- Shahed 216
- Sorena (helicopter) – Based on Robinson R44 Raven II
- Toufan I, II – helicopter based on AH-1J and produced by Iran Aviation Industries Organization, 10 Toufan I were delivered to Army in May 2010. Toufan II unveiled in January 2013.

=== Unmanned aerial vehicles ===
- A1 – A1 is capable of flying for at least two hours, and can carry a 5-kilogram payload.
- Arbaeen - Multirotor bomber drone of vertical take off and landing
- Bina, Qandil 4/5 - reconnaissance drones
- Ababil – Domestically manufactured surveillance plane. Ababil-5 is for attack missions and the Ababil-T is for short/mid-range attack missions.
- Arash UAV – a suicide and anti-radar drone with a portable launcher
- Farpad – hand-launched surveillance aircraft
- Fotros – UCAV with a range of 2000 km, flight ceiling of 25,000 ft and 16–30 hours flight endurance, armed with missiles.
- Gaza - a wide-body UAV with a flight endurance of 35 hours and an operational range of 2,000 kilometers. It is capable of carrying 13 bombs and 500 kilograms of payload.
- Hamaseh – A medium-range drone, capable of carrying air to ground missiles.
- HESA Shahed 136 – A suicide drone (kamikaze)
- Homa, Chamrosh, Jubin, Ababil-4 and Bavar-5 - naval drones
- JAS-313 - an unpiloted version of the "Qaher-313" stealth fighter jet with two variants (reconnaissance and combat). The bigger model is equipped with a jet engine. Flight endurance of an hour.
- Kaman-12 (UAV)– combat UAV. The aircraft can fly at 200 kilometers per hour for 10 straight hours. It can use an airstrip as short as 400 meters and covers a 1,000-kilometer combat radius. The UAV weighs 450 kilograms and can carry a payload as heavy as 100 kilograms.
- Kaman-19 - jamming drone
- Kaman 22 (UAV)– The first wide-body combat UAV made by Iran. The aircraft can fly at a 3000 km distance for 24 hours.
- Karrar – capable of carrying a military payload of rockets to carry out bombing missions against ground targets. It is also capable of flying long distances at a very high speed. It can also carry interceptor missiles.
- Khodkar – wide-body combat and surveillance; using J85 turbojet engine (converted Lockheed T-33)
- Kian 2
- Kian – the newest Iranian UCAV
- Me’raj-214 – Target drone
- Me’raj-504 – Target and suicide drone
- Meraj-521 - suicide drone similar to the US Switchblade kamikaze drone
- Meraj-532 - suicide drone with a range of 450 km and a warhead of 50 kg
- Meraj (UAV) – a reconnaissance drone that has a service ceiling of 3,650 meters (11,980 feet) with a maximum speed of 140 km/h
- Mobin (UAV)
- Mohajer I/II/III/IV
- Mohajer-6 (UAV)
- Mohajer 92
- Nazir (surveillance)
- Oghab – a combat drone capable of carrying air-to-surface missiles
- Omid - an anti-radiation drone used for electronic warfare
- Pelican-2 – a vertical takeoff and landing (VTOL) naval drone.
- Qods Mohajer 10
- Ra'ad 2/3, Saeqeh - suicide drones
- Raad 85 – Loitering munition.
- Rezvan - suicide drone with a reported range of 20 km and an endurance of 20 minutes.
- Sabokbal – First Iranian lightweight drone, capable of recording and dispatching films and can be prepared for flight in five minutes.
- Sadeq – a newer version of Mohajer-4
- Saeghe – Target drone
- Saegheh
- Safir - training drone
- H-110 Sarir – capable of carrying air-to-air missiles.
- Sepeher, Shahab-2 and Hodhod-4 – vertical takeoff and landing (VTOL) naval drones
- Shahab - training and reconnaissance drone
- Shahed-107 - suicide drone with a reported range of 1,500 km
- Shahed 121
- Shahed 131 – A suicide drone (kamikaze)
- Shahed-133
- Shahed 147 – HALE drone
- Shahed 238 jet drone
- Muharram - A 25 kg warhead-equipped drone system is utilized for the purpose of eliminating enemy targets and fortifications.
- Shahed 129 – UCAV with 24-hour flight capability and armed with Sadid missiles.
- Shahin – an autonomous loitering aerial drone that can collect information on the positions and movements of enemy forces on reconnaissance missions, and carry out a "kamikaze" attack. It is equipped with a 24/7 vision camera and is able to climb up to a height of 15,000 feet. It has two to three hours endurance.
- Shaparak (Butterfly) – has a maximum operational radius of 50 kilometers (31 miles), and a maximum flight ceiling of 15,000 feet (4,600 meters). This UAV is capable of three and half hours of non-stop flying, and can carry an 8-kilogram (17-pound) payload.
- Shahrivar 10th, Akhgar
- Sina, Fateh and Sanjar - suicide drones
- Sofreh Mahi – Stealth UCAV (under development)
- Talash 1,2 – Iranian training UAV.
- Yasir – A modified ScanEagle, it has a 19,500 ft service ceiling, an endurance of 24 hours, and an operational radius of 750 km.
- Zohal – VTOL unmanned aerial vehicle
- Hadid-110 – A suicide drone (Kamikaze).

=== Aircraft upgrades and components ===
- Iran claims to have upgraded its F-4, F-5, and F-14 fighter jets, and produced spare parts including tires, avionics, and engine components.
- Shahed (Observer) flight recorder – able to record flight, image, and sound parameters.
- Jahesh-700 Turbofan engine - Reverse engineered Williams FJ33.
- IAIO Owj Reverse engineered General Electric J85.
- Toloue-4 Turbojet engine - Reverse engineered Microturbo TRI 60.

=== Satellite carriers ===
- Qaem-100 satellite carrier; the first 3-stage satellite carrier with solid fuel developed by the IRGC Aerospace Force, carries satellites weighing 80 kg into an orbit 500 km above the Earth.
- Simorgh (rocket)

=== Simulators ===
- F-4 Phantom Simulator
- Toufan or AH-1J assault helicopter simulator
- Shahed-278 and Bell-206 simulator – Under project Mansour Iran built 27 Bell-206 simulators in 2003.
- Bell 214 simulator – it was built under project Qader-3 and it had cost Iran 17 billion and 500 million rials.
- Submarine Simulator – Iran's "Tareq-class" submarine.
- F-5 Tiger simulator
- Misagh rocket launcher simulator
- MiG-29 Fulcrum simulator
- F-14 Tomcat simulator
- Mirage F-1 simulator
- Hawk and Mersad air defense systems simulator
- Iran-140 full flight simulator (FFS)
- Iran-140 fix base flight simulator
- Fokker-100 fix base flight simulator
- SOCATA TB-21 Trinidad fix base flight simulator
- Emad simulator
- Ilyushin Il-76 simulator
- Sukhoi Superjet airplane simulator
- F-4 tactical simulator
- Ilushin super heavy transport plane simulator

=== Radar systems ===
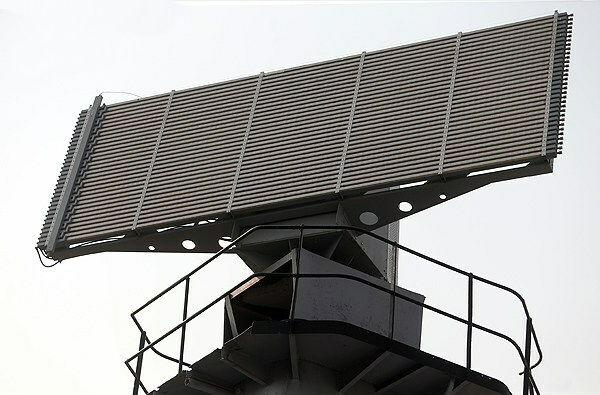
- Asr radar
  BSR-1 – VHF radar.
- Matla-ul-fajr I/II radar system
- Kashef 1,2 and 99 radars
- Alvand radar
- Asr (radar) – Asr radar is described as a S band naval three-dimensional phased array radar with a range of 200 km and capable of simultaneously identifying and intercepting 100 targets at water level or above, this radar is installed on Jamaran frigates.
- Alim passive radar system
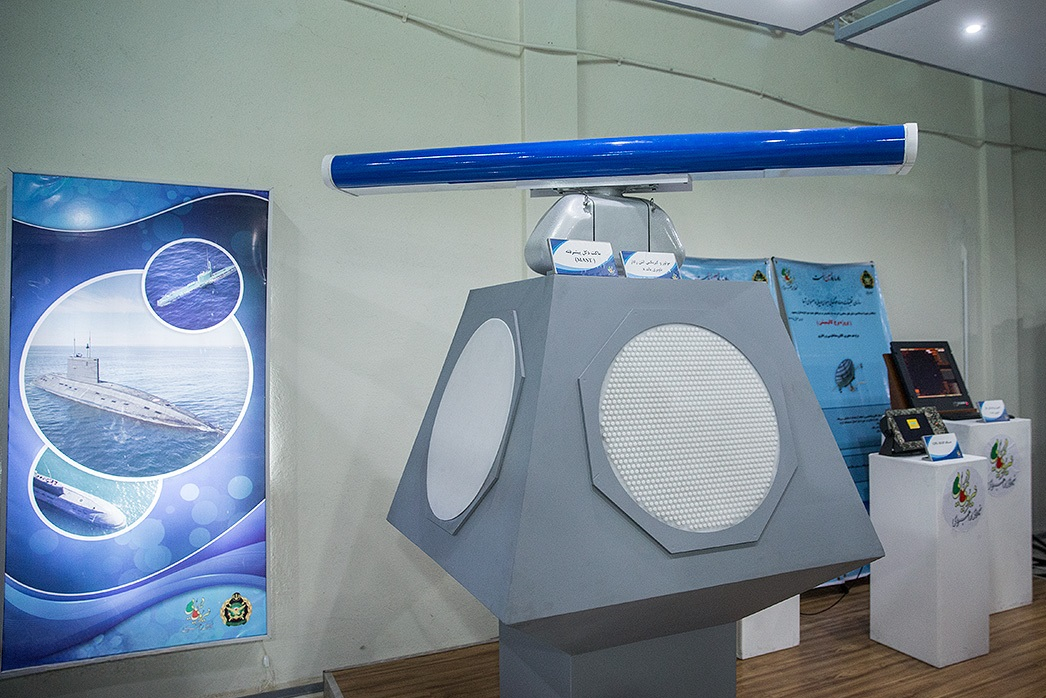
- Cheshm Oghab (Eagle eye) Naval radar
  RASIT ground-surveillance radar – Iran captured several Iraqi radars during the 1980–1988 war, and now manufactures a reverse-engineered version carried aboard a truck
- Thamen – radar system
- Electro-optical/radar system
- E-warfare systems
- Sepehr – OTH radar with a range of 3,000 kilometers in radius
- Najm-802 – Phased array radar system
- Ghadir – The Ghadir radar system which covers areas (maximum) 1,100 km in distance and 300 km in altitude has been designed and built to identify aerial targets, radar-evading aircraft, cruise missiles and ballistic missiles as well as low-altitude satellites.
- Arash – long-range radar, entered service in December 2013.
- Ghamar (3D radar) is an Iranian native production in electronic warfare.
- Khalij-e fars and Moraqeb – three dimensional phased array radar systems that can detect aerial threats up to a range of 800 and 400 kilometers respectively
- Fat’h 14 (Conquer 14) – with a range of 600 kilometers and can detect small airborne targets at a high altitude
- Me’raj 4 – ground-based long-range 3D surveillance radar system
- Nazir – long-range radar system with the capability of detecting radar-evading targets
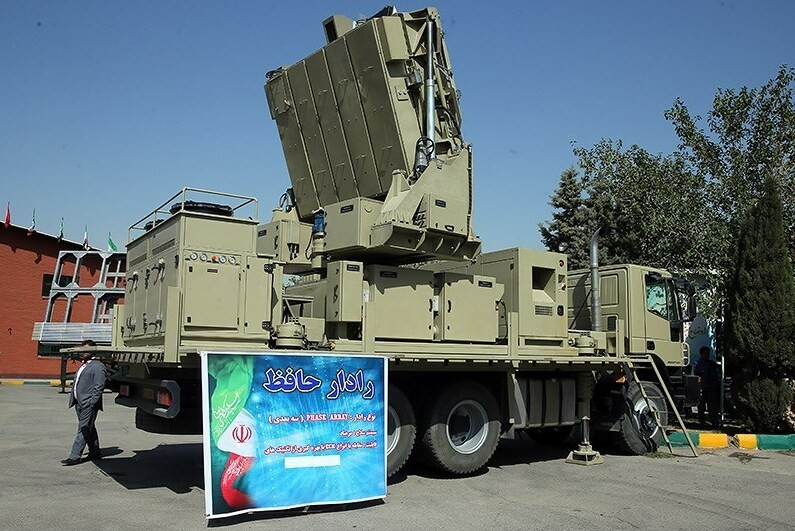
- Hafez 3D Phased array radar
  Bina
- Kavosh – based on MPQ-50
- Hadi – based on MPQ-46
- Hafez – 3D phased array radar Replaces the older Kavosh. It can detect and track 100 targets from 250 km.
- Melli – with a range of 450 km
- Jooya
- Alvand
- Tareq
- Basir-110
- GSR-110
- Ofogh
- 10th Shahrivar
- Arash I/II
- Mesbah
- Shahab
- Alam ol-Hoda
- Bashir
- Fath-2
- Keyhan
- Afagh – Coastal radar
- Shahid Jalilvand – 3D radar that deals with micro-bird targets with low cross-sections.
- Falaq (radar) – Reconstructed from Russian 67N6E (GAMMA) 3D radar
- Soroush – it can detect targets with small radar cross-section area (RCS) at low and medium altitudes within a range of 220 kilometers
- Sepehr (Sky) – a smart system for monitoring the small flying objects.
- Quds – long-range pulse-array radar Localized variant of the Vostok-E.
- Alborz - a phased-array three-dimensional radar
- Hormuz tactical mid-range radar
- Sepehr-813
- Kavosh - variant of Russian Kasta2E2
- Absar - Radar systems and electronic warfare
- Cobra V8 - is among the latest electronic warfare systems
- Eagle eye radar
- Mid-range bistatic radar
- Airport approach radar
- Sky weather radar
- Long-range wide-band air surveillance radar
- Tabas missile system radar
- Yazahra radar system
- Long-range keyhan radar
- Space object observation radar
- Raad-1 missile system radar
- Target tracking radar in Bavar-373 system

=== Missiles ===
==== Short-range ballistic missiles (SRBM) ====
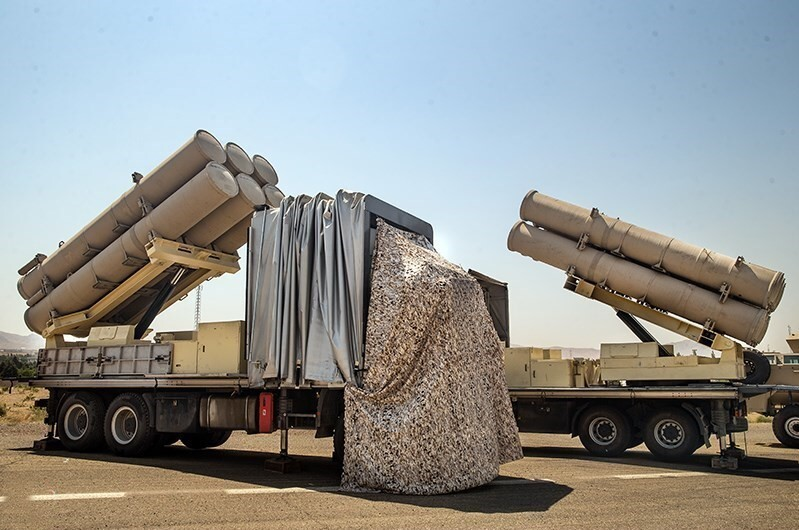
Fath-360 missile system

Short-range missiles are considered to have a range up to 1000 kilometers.

- Ababil - A ground to ground and ground to sea missile with a range of 86 km
- Shahab-1 – Liquid-propelled SRBM with a range of 350 km. It's a derivative of the North Korean Hwasong-5, which is itself a copy of the Soviet Scud-B.
- Shahab-2 – Liquid-propelled SRBM with a range of 750 km. It's based on the North Korean Hwasong-6 missile, a modified version of the Hwasong-5, itself a modification of the Soviet Scud-C.
- Qiam 1 – Liquid-propelled SRBM with a 750 km range. Has a smart targeting system. It's a licensed copy of the North Korean Hwasong-6.
- Naze'at – Unguided rocket series.
- Zelzal 1/2/3/3B – Single-stage SRBM with a range of 200 to 400 km
- Fateh-110 – Single-stage solid-propelled SRBM with a range of 300 km.
- Fath-360 – An Iranian short-range tactical ballistic missile with range of 80 to 100 km.
- Fateh-313 – Solid-propelled SRBM with a range of 500 km.
- Raad-500 – Solid-propelled SRBM with a range of 500 km. Tactical lightweight variant of Fateh-110 family of tactical SRBM with a 200 km increased range
- Zolfaqar – Solid-propelled SRBM with a range of 750 km.
- Khalij Fars – Solid-propelled anti-ship SRBM with a range of 300 km.
- Hormuz-1 – Solid-propelled anti-radar and anti-ship SRBM with a range of 300 km.
- Hormuz-2 – Solid-propelled anti-ship SRBM with a range of 300 km.
- Fateh-Mobin – Solid-propelled SRBM with a range of 300 km.

==== Medium-range ballistic missiles (MRBM) ====
Medium-range missiles are considered to have a range between 1000 and 3000 kilometers.

- Shahab-3A/B/C – Liquid-propelled MRBM with a range of 1,200 km to 2,100 km. It's based upon the North Korean Nodong-1/A and Nodong-B missiles.
- Ghadr-110 – Liquid-propelled MRBM with a range of 2000–3000 km.
- Emad – Liquid-propelled MRBM with a range of 2000 km. Improved version of Shahab-3 with 50-meter precision.
- Khorramshahr – Liquid-propelled MRBM with a range of 2000 km. Capable of carrying multiple warheads.
- Fajr-3 – MIRV warhead.
- Dezful – Solid-propelled SRBM with a range of 1000 km.
- Hajj Qassem – Solid-propelled MRBM with a range close to 1,400 kilometers.
- Ashoura – Two-staged solid-propelled MRBM with a range of 2,000 km.
- Sejjil – Two-stage solid-propelled MRBM with a range of 2000 km.
- Kheybarshekan – Precision-Striking Ballistic Missile, a range of 1,450 km. The missile is among third-generation long-range missiles indigenously developed/manufactured by military experts at the IRGC's Aerospace Division.
- Rezvan - Liquid fueled missile with a 1,400 km range.
- Unnamed anti-ship ballistic missile with a reported range of 1500 km and a speed of 8 Mach.
- Kheibar (Khorramshahr-4) - Liquid fueled missile with a range of 2,000 km and a warhead weighing 1,500 kg.
- Fattah-1 - Hypersonic missile with a range of 1,400 km and a reported speed of Mach 13.
- Fattah-2 - Hypersonic missile with a range of 1,500 km and a reported speed of Mach 13.
- Jihad - Liquid-fueled missile with a range of 1,000 km, probably an optimized version of the Qiam missile.
- Etemad - 16-meter-long missile with 1,700 km range and a precision-guided warhead.
- Qassem Basir – Solid-propelled MRBM with a range of at least 1,200 kilometers.
- Nasrallah

==== Cruise missiles ====
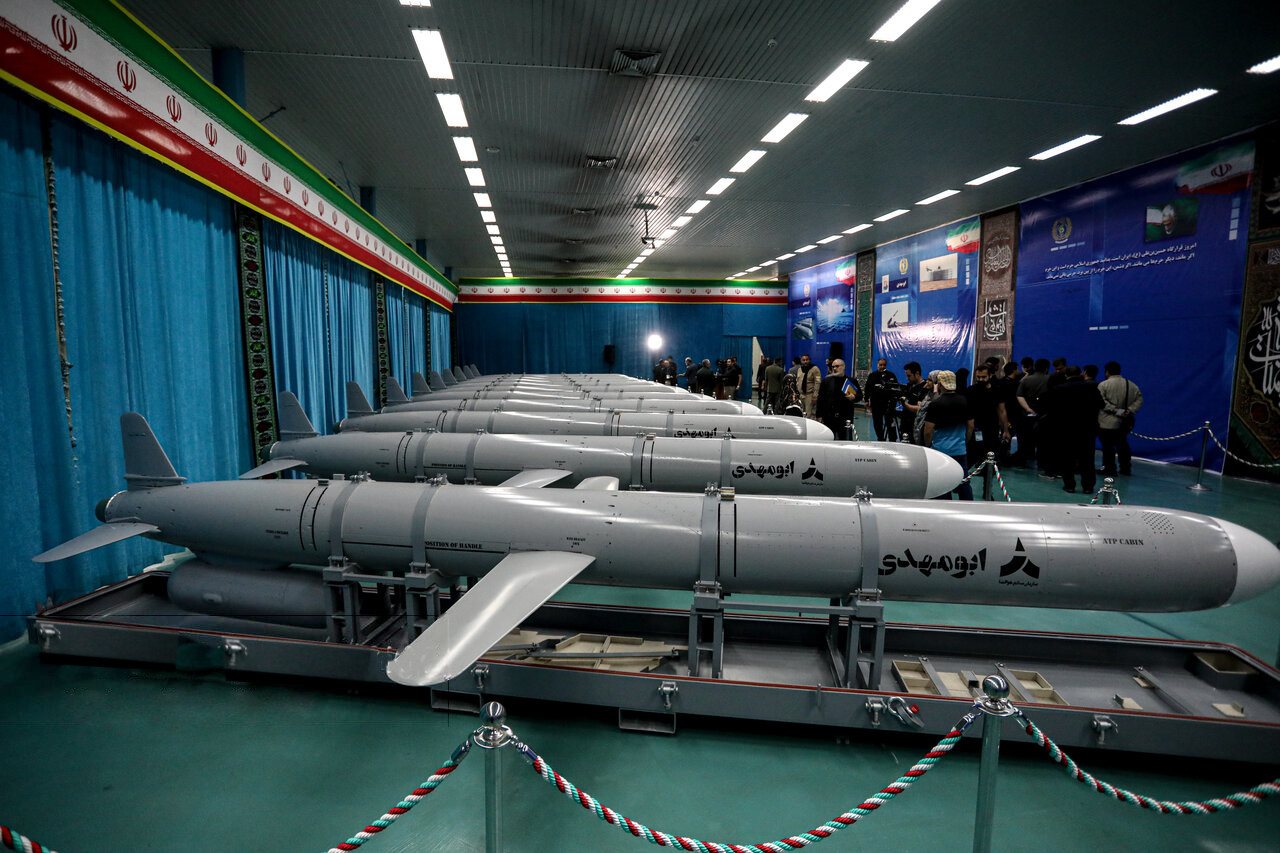
- Abu Mahdi Cruise missile
  Nasr-1 – Iranian-made short-range missiles.
- Meshkat – Iranian cruise missile with a range of 2000 kilometers.
- Qader – Iranian anti-ship cruise missile with a range over 200 km.
- Ya-Ali – Iranian land attack cruise missile with 700 km range.
- Soumar – copy of the Raduga Kh-55.
- Noor – Anti-ship cruise missile based on C-802
- Kowsar – medium-range, land-based anti-ship missile
- Ghadir - Anti-ship missile
- Nasr-e Basir – Anti-ship cruise missile
- Zafar – Anti-ship cruise missile
- Nasir – anti-ship cruise missile
- Hoveyzeh- Surface-to-surface cruise missile with a range of 1350 km.
- Martyr Abu Mahdi al-Muhandis – cruise missile with a range of 1,000 kilometers
- Heidar 1 and 2 - Heidar-1 is UAV-launched, it has a range of 200 km and a speed of 1000 km/h.
- Asef - air launched long range missile installed on the Sukhoi Su-24
- Paveh - cruise missile with a range of 1,650 km
- Qadr-474 - ship based cruise missile with a 2,000 km range
- Talaiyeh - strategic cruise missile with a range of over 1,000 km
- Qadr-380 - cruise missile with a range of over 1,000 km

==== Anti-tank missiles ====
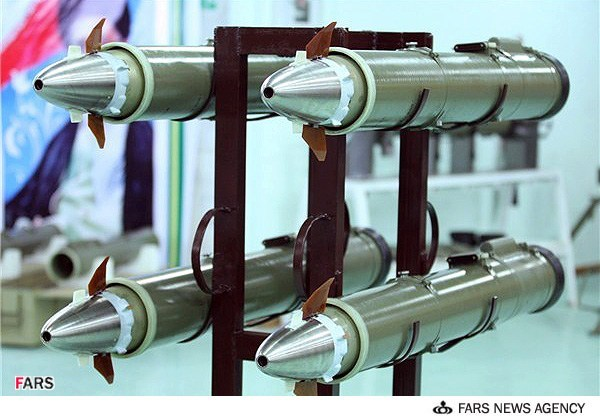
- Dehlavieh ATGM
  Raad-T – copy of Soviet AT-3 Sagger
- RPG-29
- Saegheh – improved version of the RPG-7
- Toophan – Copy of American TOW missile
- Saeghe 1/2 – Copy of the American M47 Dragon.
- Almas – An unlicensed copy of the Israeli Spike anti-tank guided missile.
- Towsan-1
- Tosan (missile) – Iranian version of the 9M113 Konkurs/AT-5 Spandrel
- Dehlaviyeh – Locally produced version of the Kornet-E
- Tondar (missile) – Iranian made version of 9M119 Svir ATGM with a range of 4,000 m.
- Pirooz – anti-tank guided missile carrier
- Qare'a (rocket launcher)
- Sadid-365 - top attack anti-tank missile with a range of 8 kilometers

==== Recoilless rifles ====
- SPG-9 – reverse engineered version of 73 mm SPG-9 recoilless rifle
- 106mm Recoilless rifle – Iranian version of M40 A2 recoilless rifle
- Nafez-2 – anti-armor launcher

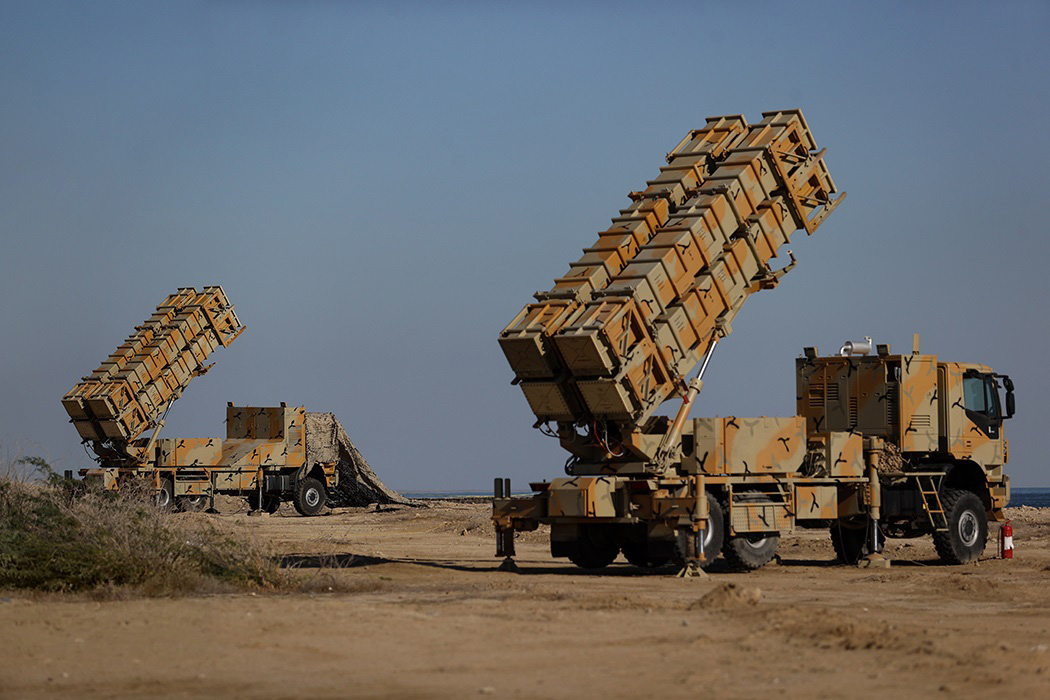
Khordad 15

==== Air defense weapons ====
- Khordad 15 – Surface-to-air missile (SAM) system
- Qaem – anti-helicopter, lightweight, laser-guided missile
- Raad – anti-helicopter system.
- Misagh-1 – copy of Chinese QW-1 Vanguard with upgrades
- Misagh-2 – copy of Chinese QW-2 Vanguard
- Misagh-3
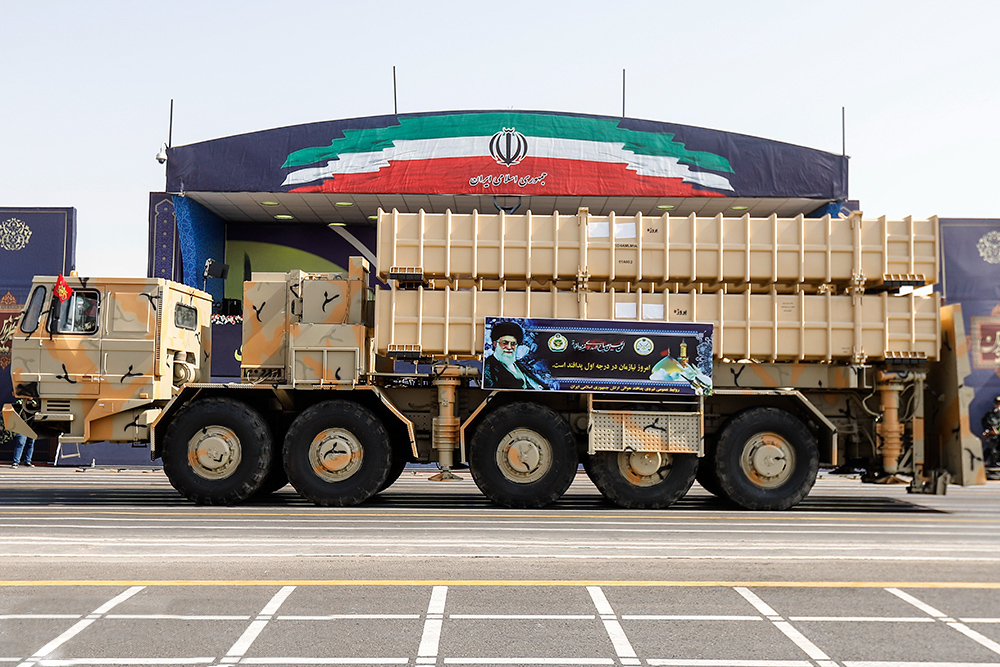
- Bavar 373
  23mm Anti-Aircraft Gun – Iranian version of ZU-23 which comes in one or two barrel configurations
- Samavat 35 mm Anti-Aircraft Guns – Copy of Oerlikon 35 mm twin cannon
- Sa'ir 100 mm Anti-Aircraft Guns – automatic version of KS-19 gun, it can detect and intercept targets through radar or optical systems at low and med-altitude
- Shahab-e-Saqeb (missile) – copy of the Chinese HQ-7 (FM-80)
- Sayyad-1 / Sayyad-1A – upgraded copy of HQ-2, with IR tracking. No longer used.
- Sayyad-2 (Hunter II). Upgraded version of the RIM-66 Standard with better ECM.
- Fajr-8 – upgrade of S-200 Largely phased out of service.
- Fajr-27 – advanced sea rapid fire cannon
- Fath (victory) – the 40-millimeter naval cannon's range is 12 km and shoots 300 projectiles per minute.
- Mersad – Iran's first air defense system based on the US MIM-23 Hawk. Most have been upgraded to Kamin-2
- Mesbah 1 air defense system – can target and destroy fighters, helicopters, cruise missiles and other low flying objects. It is equipped with a three-dimensional interception radar and an optical guidance system. It can fire 4,000 rounds per minute.
- Mehrab (altar) – Medium-range smart missile. Mehrab is equipped with anti-radar and anti-jamming systems.
- Raad – Air defense system with a range of 50 kilometers and engagement altitude of 25 to 27 kilometers
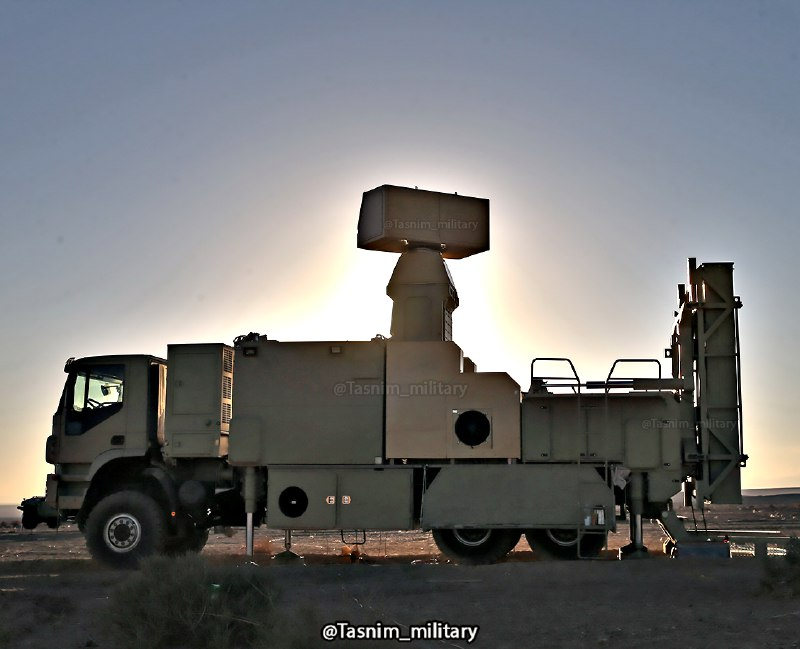
- Zubin air defense
  Bavar-373 – Iran-made air defense system carrying the Sayyad-4 (missile), which uses two or three types of missiles to confront aerial targets in different layers.
- Ya Zahra – Low-altitude mobile air defense system.
- Herz-9 – Passive low-altitude mobile air defense system with an operating range of 10 km and an altitude of 5 km.
- Talaash - A mid-range, high-altitude mobile air defense missile system which uses an upgraded copy of SM-1 (RIM-66) missile called Sayyad-2.
- Asefeh – Asefeh is three-barrelled 23 mm Gatling gun that is reportedly capable of firing up to 900 rounds a minute, it is currently under development by IRGC ground force and will be used as a close in weapon system to defend against cruise missiles.
- 3rd Khordad – missile system with a range of 75 kilometers and an altitude of 30 km
- Tabas – missile system with a range of 60 kilometers and an altitude of 30 kilometers
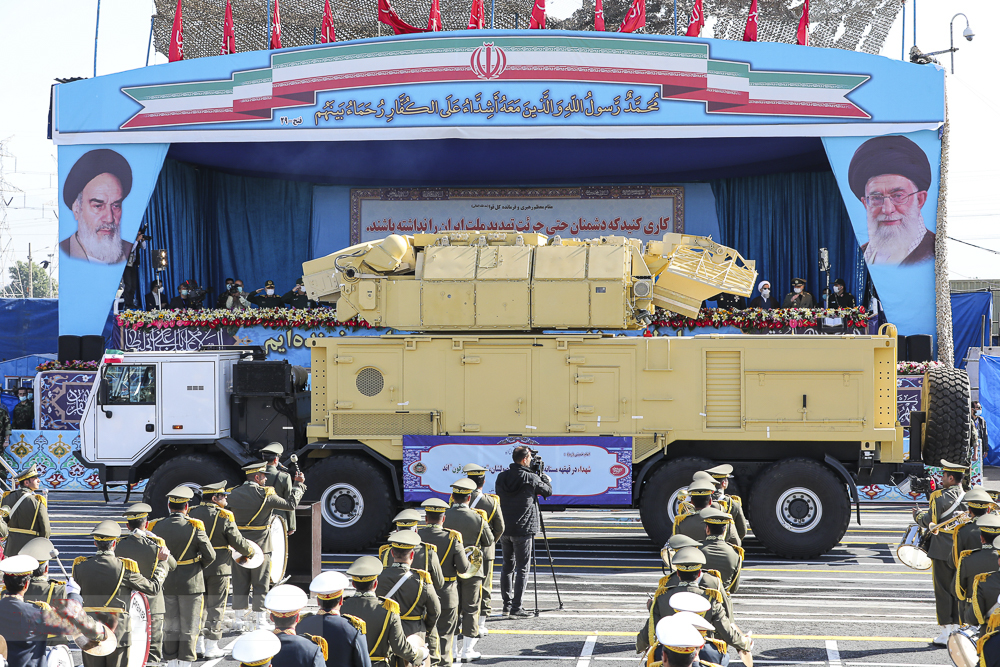
- Dezful air defense System
  Damavand - A long-range missile system
- Majid Expected to replace older Rapier, Herz-9, and FM-80
- 9 of Dey - A missile system which is capable of engaging and destroying cruise missiles and drones.
- Arman (missile system) Anti-Ballistic Missile system with 3 120-km range missiles and a phased-array radar
- Lt. General Qassem Soleimani - Ship point air defense missile/gun system
- Dezful air defense system - Upgraded Tor-M1
- Zoubin
- Eagle - A new air defense system
- Azarakhsh - A vehicle-mounted low-altitude missile system
- 358 missile - a loitering surface-to-air missile
- Qaem-118 - Anti-drone air defense system with 25 km range. Carried by a truck which hosts five launchers.

==== Air-to-ground munitions ====
- Qadr – Electro-optically guided 2000 lb glide-bomb
- Zoobin – Electro-optically guided 750 lb glide-bomb
- Akhgar (missile) – The 1.7-meter-long, optical-guided missile has a range of 30 km and can fly at a speed of 600 km/h.
- Sattar 1/2/3/4 – Medium Range air-to-ground missiles.
- Qassed I/II/III – Electro-optically guided 2000 lb bomb. Qassed-2 has a range of 50 km, Qassed-3 has a range of over 100 km
- Raad 301 – A smart bomb that has GPS/INS guidance like the (JDAM) guided bombs.
- Asre – Laser-guided air-to-ground missile.
- Kite – Stand-off sub-munitions dispenser.
- Bina – Laser-guided air-to-ground and ground-to-ground missile. It appears to be an AGM-65 Maverick air-to-ground missile with a semi-active laser (SAL) seeker fitted to its nose. Bina-2 was unveiled in 2018 which has increased precision and range.
- Sadid-1 – Light air to ground missile.
- Sadid-345 – Light precision guided munition.
- Shafaq has a 13kg warhead and a speed of Mach 2.2. It can destroy targets within 20 km. It is equipped with fire-and-forget guidance and an infrared search and track system enabling it to operate in extreme weather conditions day and night.
- Balaban – Satellite-guided long-range bomb
- Yasin – 60km range guided bomb. a part of the Yasin family of PGMs which include Yasin-90, Yasin-98, and Yasin-400.
- Qaem 1/5/9 – Electro-optically or thermally-guided weapon.
- Qaem 114 – Electro-optically guided anti-armor 1,000mm penetrating dual-charge warhead missile similar to AGM-114 Hellfire
- Fadak – 2-4-km range guided or unguided 80mm and 11–16 kg weight air-to-ground rocket with a high-explosive anti-armor warhead and a speed of 700 meters per second
- Heidar (missile), an air-to-ground missile
- Qamar Bani Hashem – Air-to-air and air-to-ground rocket used on Toufan. Has fire and forget with a range of more than 8km
- Almas 1/2/3/4 – guided top attack missile for Ababil-3 drones. Derived from Spike
- Shahin 3 - air-to-ground (missile)
- Arman-1/2 - guided bomb with a 20 km range. Arman-2 has a 100 km range
- Qadr-29 - 150-km range missile for the Bell 206 helicopters

==== Air-to-air missiles ====
- Fatter – copy of U.S. AIM-9 Sidewinder
- Sedjil – copy of U.S. MIM-23 Hawk converted to be carried by aircraft
- Fakour 90 – Iranian version of AIM-54 Phoenix, it was successfully tested in February 2013.
- Azarakhsh – carried by homegrown ‘Karrar’ drones

==== Naval missiles ====
- Ra'ad – Indigenously developed long-range anti-ship missile based on HY-2 Silkworm.
- Fajre Darya – a copy of Sea Killer II.
- Thaqeb – Similar to Noor, modified for submarine launch.
- Khalij Fars – Anti ship ballistic missile based on Fateh-110
- Hormuz I/II – naval strike ballistic missile that can hit mobile targets at sea with high precision
- Jask-2 – Submarine-launched cruise missile

==== Torpedoes ====
- Kuse
- Yasin
- Hoot – A supercavitation torpedo. Possible copy of the Russian VA-111 Shkval.
- Valfajr
- Miad

=== Anti-submarine ===
- Dehlaviyeh – laser-guided anti-submarine missile

=== Armored Vehicles ===
- Zulfiqar MBT Developed from U.S. M60 Patton and Russian T-72. Production halted.
- T-72Z Safir-74 – Indigenously upgraded Soviet T-54/55 and Chinese Type 59
- Mobarez – Indigenous upgrade of British Chieftain.
- T-72S – Soviet T-72 produced under license in Iran. Currently under upgrade.
- Karrar (tank) – 800 on order, unknown number received. Similar to Russian T-90M.
- Sayyad – Quick reaction vehicle for unconventional warfare.
- Tosan – Iranian light tank for unconventional warfare, developed from British FV101 Scorpion.
- Cobra BMT-2 – Concept vehicle for the Boragh armed with 23 mm anti-aircraft gun for use as a fire support vehicle.
- Boragh – Copy of Soviet BMP-1 with indigenous upgrades
- Rakhsh – Iranian developed 4x4 armored personnel carrier
- Sarir or Tala'iyeh – Newly developed 4x4 armored personnel carrier for IRGC
- Hoveizeh – Ultra-light tracked APC.
- Heidar-5 – wheeled minelayer armored vehicle
- Heidar-6 – 8x8 APC
- Toofan- Four-wheel drive APC with protection against land mines and improvised explosive device.
- Ra'ad – 6x6 heavy MRAP
- Heidar-7 – Based on BTR-60PB with TV remote control station for ZU-23-2. Limited production.
- Makran IFV – Upgrade of the BTR-50PK with a new unmanned turret equipped with a 30mm Shipunov 2A42 and 7.62mm machine gun, newly welded frontal and side armor, a new engine, and new electronics.

=== Other vehicles ===
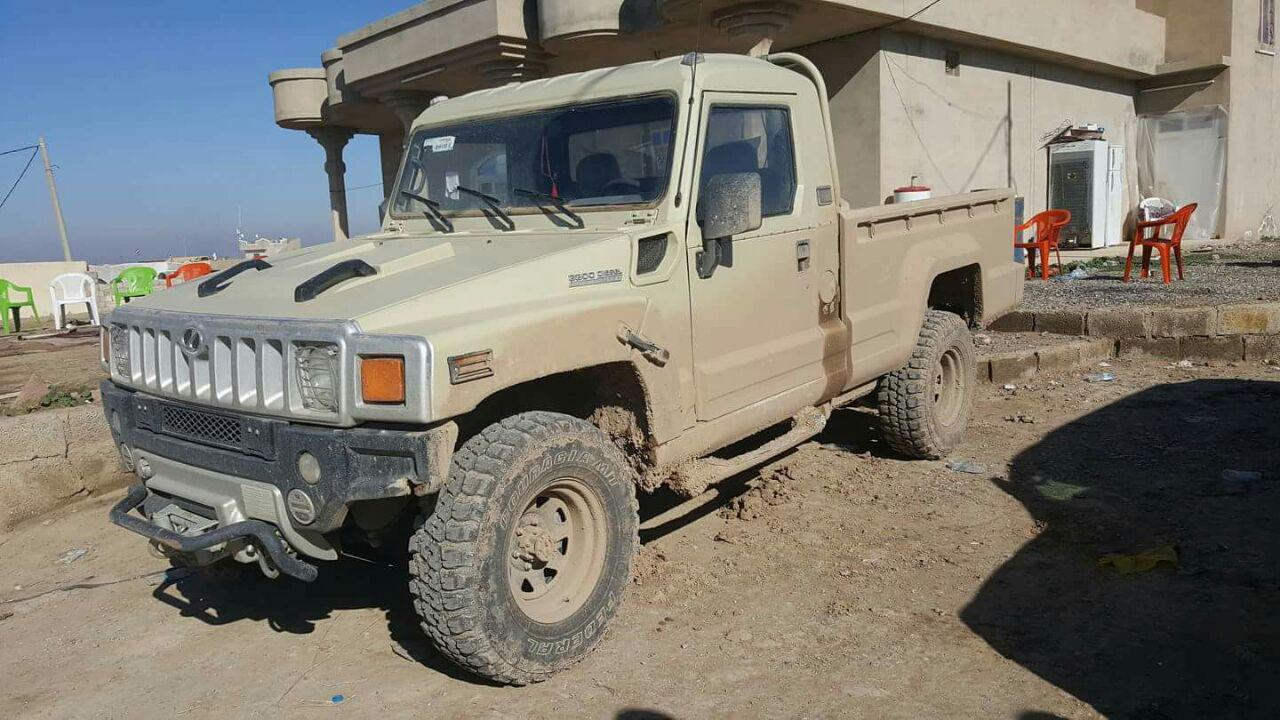
- Aras 2 Multipurpose tactical vehicle
  Sepehr – Iranian tactical vehicle
- Safir Jeep
- Yoz 102 tactical vehicle
- Tondar 1.4 ton tactical car
- Kaviran – 3.4 ton tactical car
- Neynava – 4x4 military truck of Iran-made
- BABR 400 – 8x8 heavy military truck, based on Soviet MAZ-537
- Aras l/ll/3 Tactical Vehicle – 3.4 ton Tactical Vehicle
- Zoljanah heavy truck – 10x10 heavy duty truck
- Shahid Mohammad Nazeri – long-range and fast cruising watercraft
- Zafar – 8x8 heavy truck, built for Bavar 373
- Pooriya – Tank transporter
- Samandar
- Fallagh – ultra-light tracked combat vehicle with remote weapon station
- Network-based intelligent robot (Heydar 1) – It has 6x6 active wheels, load-carrying and high-explosive capabilities, 360° degree rotation and barrier detection. It has a rifle (AK platform) and is capable of targeting and firing automatically at targets and there is also a suicide version for striking the tanks with below hit.
- Roo'in tan – It is a lightweight tactical bulletproof car that is resistant to steel core bullets up to .50cal
- Kian 500/600/700/800 – Tank transporters
- Caracal – It is an armed ground based robot
- Nazir rocket launcher (robot)
- Hafez EOD or fire-fighting robot
- Qasim UGV carrying a multicopter unmanned aircraft
- Fajr cameraman robot
- Younes small unmanned underwater vehicle

=== Mortars ===
- 37mm Marsh Mortar – A compact commando mortar developed by the Iranian Army during the Iran-Iraq War
- HM 12 – 60 mm mortar
- HM 13 – 60 mm mortar
- HM 14 – 60 mm mortar
- HM 15 – 81 mm mortar
- HM 16 – 120 mm mortar
- Razm Mortar – 120 mm mortar
- Vafa Mortar – 160 mm mortar.
- 120 mm mortar shells
- 130 mm mortar shells

=== Artillery ===
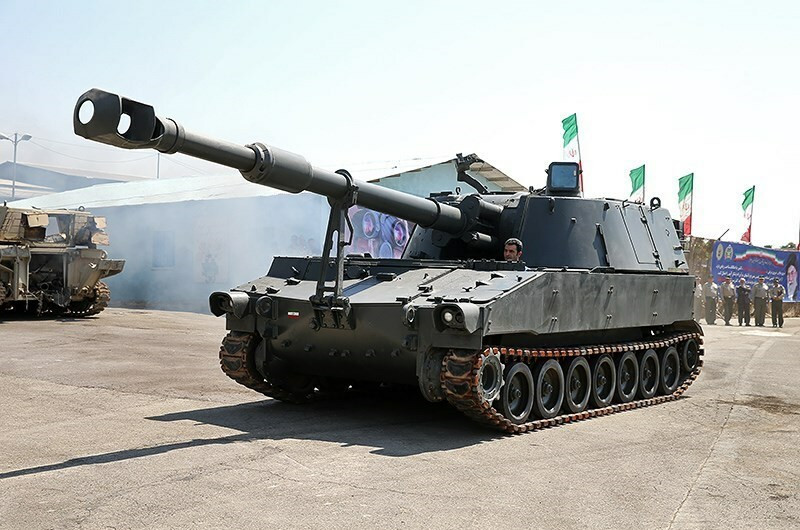
- Hoveyzeh 155mm Howitzer
  HM 40 – A 122 mm howitzer
- HM 41 – A 155 mm howitzer
- Raad 1 – SP gun Chinese Type WZ 501/503 IFV with D-30 122 mm gun.
- Raad 2 – SP gun based on the U.S. M109 howitzer
- Hoveyzeh – A 155 mm self-propelled howitzer based on the M-109B Howitzer.
- Basir – Laser-guided 155 mm artillery shell capable of engaging moving targets at the range of 20 km.
- Sa’eqeh – remote-controlled anti-helicopter mine with range of 300m
- Seraj - 35 mm cannon system
- Kamand – Close-in weapon system (CIWS) based on AK-630M

=== Rocket Artillery ===
- HM 20 – Iranian version of the BM-21
- Heidar 44 – Upgraded BM-21 Grad equipped with a fire control system. It utilizes surveillance drones for more precise fire.
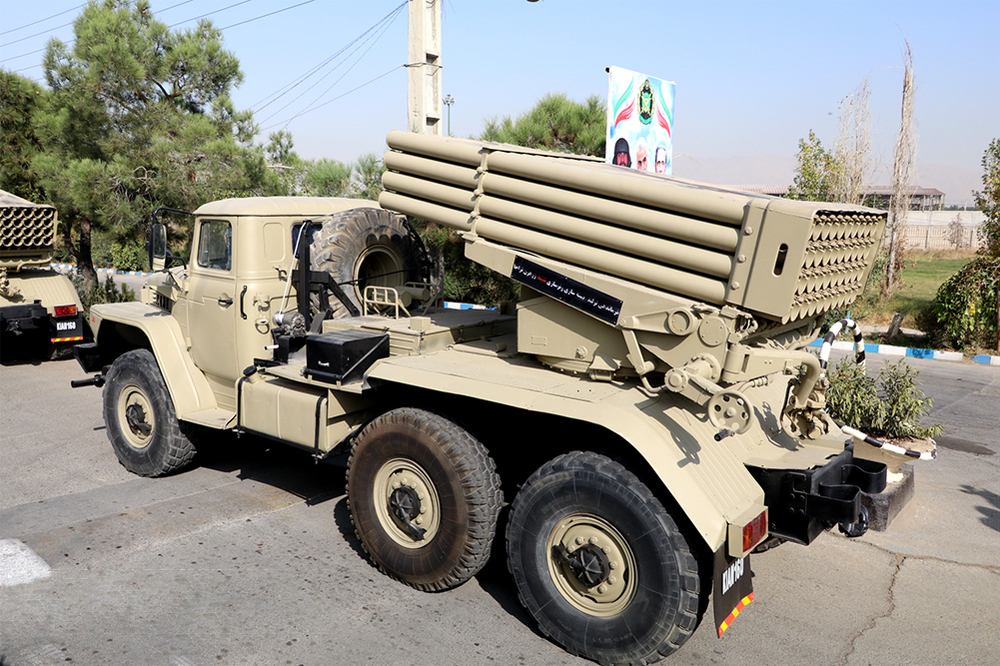
- Heidar-44 MRLS
  Arash – Iranian 122 mm guided artillery rocket
- Oghab – Iranian 230 mm unguided artillery rocket
- Falaq-1 – Iranian 240 mm unguided artillery rocket similar to BM-24
- Falaq-2 – Iranian 333 mm unguided artillery rocket
- Fajr-1 – Iranian version of 107 mm Type 63 MRS artillery rocket
- Fajr-3 – artillery rocket
- Fajr-5 – artillery rocket

=== Small arms ===
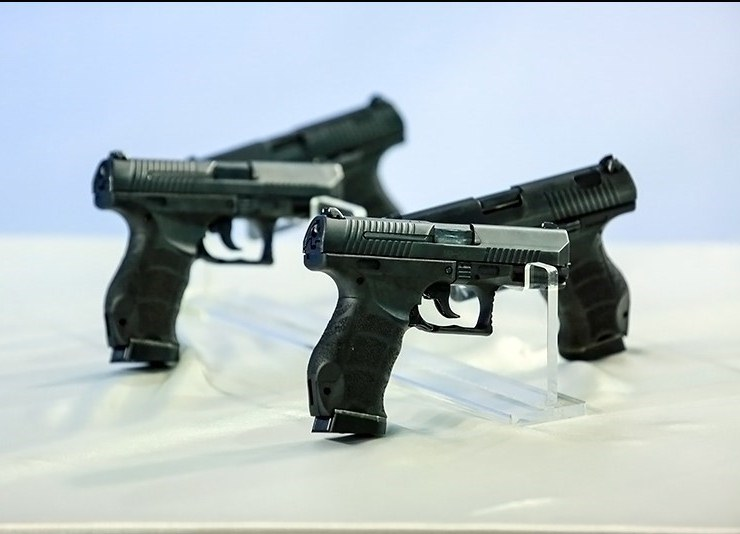
- M9-02 — copy of Walther P99 pistol
  Pistols:
  - PC-9 "Zoaf" – copy of Swiss-German SIG P226 pistol.
  - Kaveh-17 – copy of Glock 17 pistol.
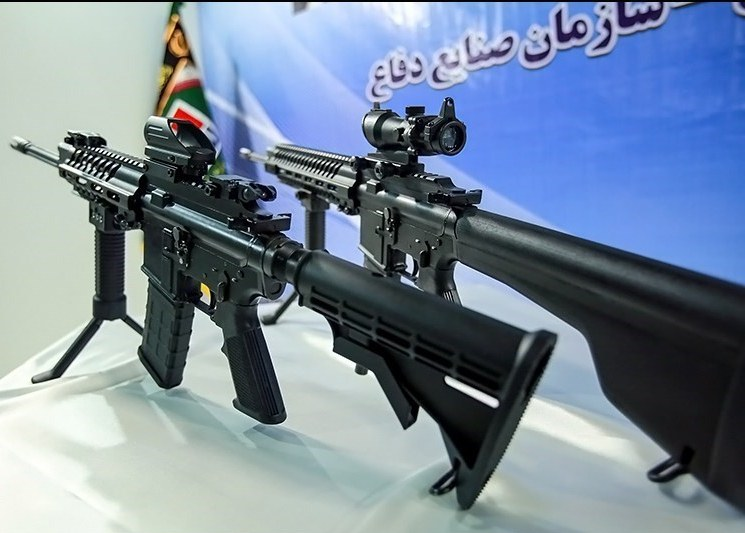
  - Masaf Assault rifle
    Kaveh-19 – copy of Glock 19 pistol.
  - M9-02 — copy of Walther P99 pistol.
- Submachine guns:
  - MPT-9 – Tondar submachine gun – copy of MP5 (H&K licensed production).
- Assault rifles:
  - Fateh – Iranian clone of American Remington ACR.
  - KH-2002 – 5.56mm bullpup conversion kit for the M-16.
  - S-5.56 – copy of Norinco CQ, Chinese clone of the M-16
  - KL-7.62 – copy of AKM.
  - G3A6 – copy of H&K G3A3 7.62 mm (H&K licensed production).
  - Masaf The Army's new standard-issue rifle. It replaces the H&K G3, and is chambered in 7.62x51.
  - Zolfaqar — 7.62×51 mm clone of American XCR-L.
  - Sama.
  - Fajr 224
- Machine guns:
  - PKM-T80 – copy of Soviet PKM
  - Sa'aban-1 – Iranian upgrade of the old Russian-made RPD.
  - MGA3 – copy of MG3 7.62 mm (Rheinmetal licensed production)
  - MGD-12.7mm – copy of Soviet DShkM.
  - Akhgar – Iranian made 7.62mm Gatling gun capable of firing 4,000 to 6,000 rounds per minute.
  - Moharram – Iranian made 12.7mm Gatling gun capable of firing 2,500 rounds per minute.
- Sniper and anti-material rifles:
  - Nakhjir – copy of Soviet SVD.
  - Ashtar – 7.62×64mm sniper rifle.
  - Taher – 7.62×51 mm sniper rifle.
  - Siavash – 7.62×51 mm sniper rifle.
  - Taktab – anti-material rifle.
  - Sayyad – Iranian Steyr HS .50 clone with slightly different muzzle brake and curved pistol grip.
  - Nasr – 12.7mm sniper rifle.
  - Heidar – 12.7mm sniper rifle.
  - Shaher – Iranian developed 14.5mm sniper rifle.
  - Arash – Indigenous 20mm sniper rifle.
  - Kamin — 20×102 mm single-shot bolt-action sniper rifle.
  - Baher – 23mm caliber sniper rifle.
  - Nasir – 40mm automatic grenade launcher.

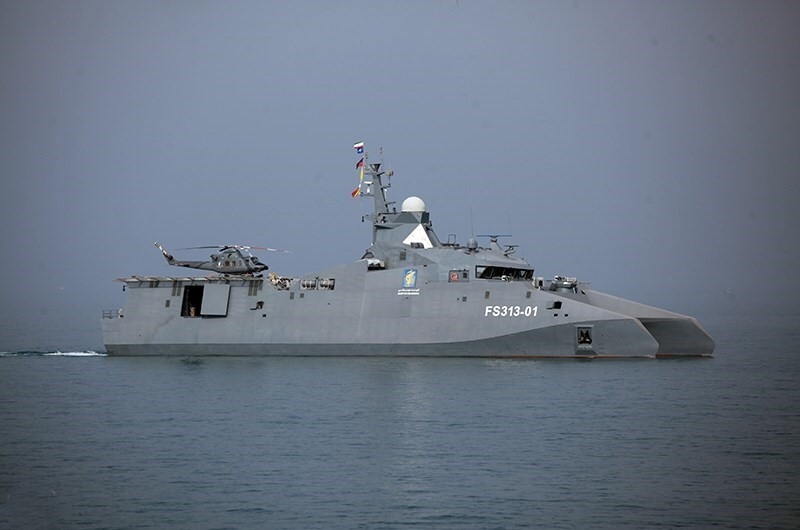
Soleimani Missile Corvette

=== Boats and destroyers ===
- Shahid Soleimani – modern indigenous catamaran
- Shahid Nazeri – first indigenous catamaran
- Sina class – heavily upgraded, French Kaman (La Combattante II) class missile boats.
  - Paykan
  - Joshan
  - Derafsh
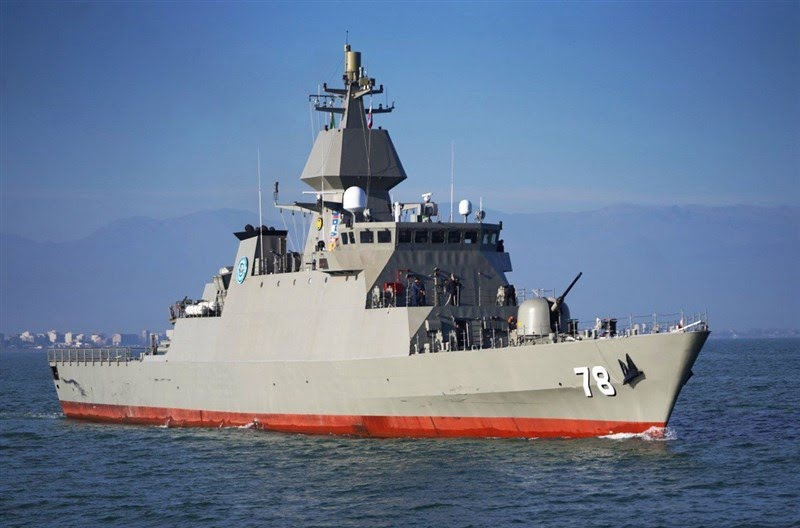
  - Deylaman Frigate
    Zereh
  - Separ
- Moudge class – upgraded and modified British Alvand (Saam) class (aka Vosper Mk 5 type) frigates.
  - Jamaran – multi-mission frigate with a displacement of around 1,400 tonnes, can carry 120–140 personnel on board and is armed with a variety of anti-ship and surface-to-air missiles.
  - Sahand
  - Dena
  - Deylaman
  - IRIS Zagros
- Kashdom – patrol boat
- Tondar class – fast attack craft
- Zolfaqar – torpedo-armed watercraft
- Seraj – high-speed attack craft
- Yunes 6 – six-passenger hovercraft
- Tondar – Hovercraft with missile/drone launch capability
- Azarakhsh-clas missile boat – based on C 14-class missile boat
- Tir
- Ya Mahdi
- Bavar GEV
- Hendijan

=== Submarines ===
- Besat Class Submarine

Midget Submarines

- Ghadir Class Submarine
- Nahang Class Submarine
- Fateh Class Submarine

=== Other ===
- Missile Magazine System
- 1 bulletproof vest
- Dome and Directional Breakers
- "Samat" cameras for the RF-4 reconnaissance aircraft
- ‘Samam’ location data management system
- Jalal – A mobile electro-optical monitoring system.
- Fakur and Rasool – command control and tactical communication systems
- T-10 and T-11 parachutes
- Maham-II helicopter launched naval mine
- Tls-99 laser marking pod
- Arash EW system
- Cobra V8 - The native version of Krasukha-4 electronic warfare system.
- Saeqeh "Lighting forest" Electronic warfare system.
- Shafaq chaff and flare countermeasure system
- Electronic Chart Display and Information System - ship navigation system
- Hunter-2 - EW system High power Anti-UAV system
- Umbrella-4 – Comprehensive Anti-Drone EW system
- Yousef Night vision system
- Dideban ("Watch") thermal night vision system
- Mine-clearing UUV
- Hovanirouz's realistic operational combat system
- Helicopter self-defense systems; Utilization and use of Chaff and Flare self-protection systems, DRFM system, communication jamming system, laser warning system and GNSS navigation jamming system on flying devices increases the combat power and survival of helicopters.

== See also ==
- Defense Industries Organization
- Economy of Iran
- International rankings of Iran
- Iran Aviation Industries Organization
- Iran Electronics Industries
- Iranian Space Agency
- Iranian underground missile bases
- Military of Iran
- Science and technology in Iran
