= Tondar (missile) =

- Type: Anti-tank missile
- Place of origin: Iran

Production history
- Manufacturer: Ministry of Defence and Armed Forces Logistics (Iran)

Specifications
- Caliber: 125 mm
- Effective firing range: 4 km

Tondar Missile (Persian: تندر) is an Iranian Anti-tank guided missile fired from the barrels of T-72 tanks. This Iranian missile which has been manufactured by Ministry of Defence and Armed Forces Logistics (Iran), is launched from a 125 mm cannon barrel. Tondar-missile can destroy diverse targets at 4 kilometers distances.

Iranian experts have applied the capabilities of the Tosan (missile) in the manufacturing process of Tondar-missile, that means: this anti-tank missile can target both fixed/moving targets on land and sea. Meanwhile, this missile has the capability of destroying low-speed flying targets; and that's due to the kind of Tondar guidance. It is said to be a copy of the AT-11 Sniper Soviet missile. The warhead of the Tondar missile is lighter than that of the AT-11 Sniper missile which may indicate design changes or poor data reporting.

According to the commander of the Islamic Republic of Iran's army in the Fars region: "It was the first time that in the exercise of Beit al-Moqaddas 26 in May 2014, three Iranian missiles of Dehlaviyeh, Tondar and Tusan were tested."

== See also ==
- List of military equipment manufactured in Iran
- Islamic Republic of Iran Army
- Toophan
- Kheibar Shekan
