= Valfajr (torpedo) =

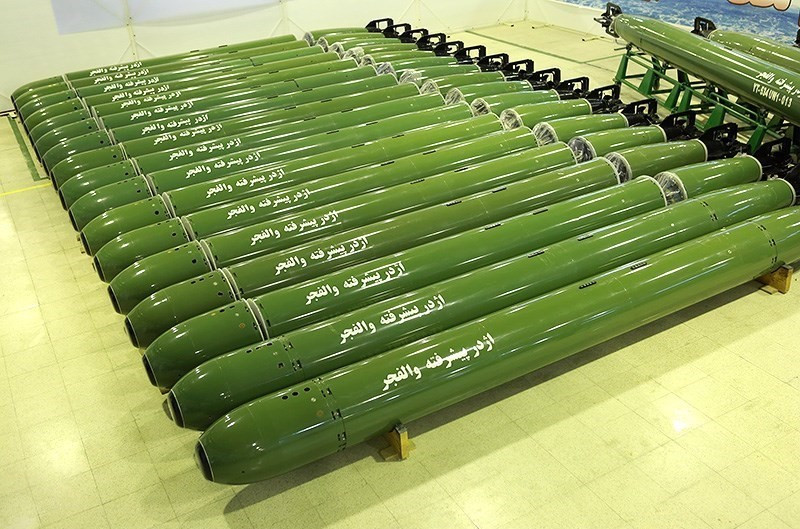
- Type: Heavyweight torpedo
- Place of origin: Iran

Production history
- Designed: 2011
- Produced: 2015
- Variants: Valfajr-2

Specifications
- Diameter: 533 mm
- Warhead: high explosive plus unused fuel
- Warhead weight: 220/300 kg
- Operational range: 15 km
- Launch platform: Submarine

Valfajr is a modern homing torpedo system designed, developed, and tested by Iran's Ministry of Defence.

== History ==
In 2011, it was presented by the Iranian Ministry of Defence.

Brigadier General Hossein Dehghan (Iran's defence minister) and Flotilla Admiral Habibollah Sayyari (the Commander of the Iranian regular Navy) opened the production line on 13 October 2015. In the opening ceremony, Dehghan stated that "the torpedo is capable of destroying various marine targets, including large vessels, in a few seconds."

In October 2015, Iran started mass-production of the Valfajr and has claimed that the weapon has now been upgraded with an anti-jamming system.

== Capacity ==
The torpedo carries an explosive warhead weighing between 220 and 300 kilograms capable of crippling naval targets in different weather and depth conditions.

== See also ==
- Hoot (torpedo)
- List of military equipment manufactured in Iran
- Iranian underground missile bases
- Ghamar (3D radar)
