= Zoljenah truck =

Zoljanah
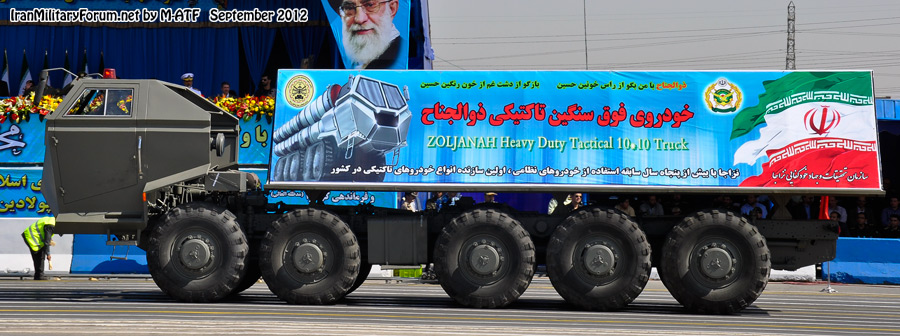
- Iranian Zoljanah Heavy Duty Tactical 10x10 truck at a parade
- Type: military vehicle
- Place of origin: Islamic Republic of Iran

Production history
- Manufacturer: Islamic Republic of Iran Army Ground Forces
- Produced: 2014-Present (Iran)

Specifications
- Mass: 21 tonnes. 30 tonnes fully loaded
- Length: 10.5 m
- Crew: 2 passengers
- Main armament: Bavar-373
- Engine: 500 hp

Zoljanah is a ten wheel drive, highly mobile heavy truck designed and built in Iran. It is used to carry the Bavar 373 air defence system which includes the Fakour command and control system. This has the ability to collect information from all sources relevant to air defense, including passive and active military radars (such as the Mersad), signal surveillance, missile systems and command and control systems.

This is a super-heavy truck produced by the Islamic Republic of Iran Army Ground Forces and was introduced in 2014 by Ahmad Reza Pourdastan, the then commander of the Nizaja. To date, two units of this powerful truck have been manufactured and delivered to the armed forces of the Islamic Republic of Iran Army.

== Features ==
- The capability to traverse a river with a depth of 1.5 meters
- The ability to transport a load weighing 30 tons
- The capacity to carry cargo exceeding 5 meters in length
- The military vehicle has an approximate weight of 21 tons
- Equipped with a turbocharged diesel engine that generates 500 horsepower
- It is capable of transporting ballistic missiles and radar systems
- Featuring five axles, including two front axles and one rear axle, the vehicle can be maneuvered and rotated by the driver

== See also ==
- List of military equipment manufactured in Iran
- Neynava truck
- Military of Iran
- Iranian military industry
- Equipment of the Iranian army
