= Moharram (Gatling gun) =

Gatling gun

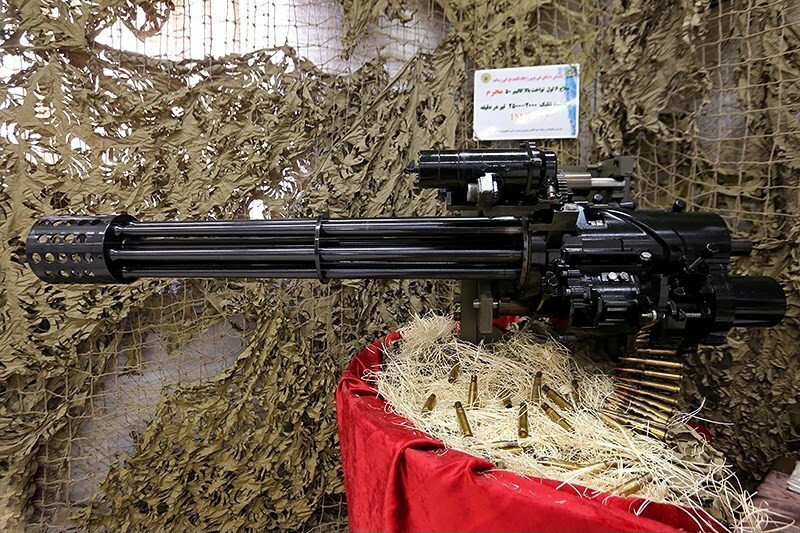
- Place of origin: Iran

Service history
- Used by: Islamic Revolutionary Guard Corps

Specifications
- Cartridge: 12.7×108mm
- Caliber: .50
- Barrels: 6
- Rate of fire: Up to 2500 rounds per minute

The Moharram, sometimes Muharram, (MGG-50) is an indigenous 6-barreled 12.7x108mm (.50 caliber) Gatling gun of the Islamic Revolutionary Guard Corps. The weapon is most commonly seen mounted on pickup trucks and other light vehicles, as well as on naval vessels. The weapon is externally powered, and is capable of firing up to 2,500 rounds per minute.

The gun was unveiled along with Akhgar in a parade on 18 April 2014, which was attended Iranian president Hassan Rouhani along with military commanders. It was unveiled alongside the Akhgar ATGM and the Shaher.

Low-quality internet rumors report that Moharram machine guns may be exported to Russia.

== See also ==
- List of military equipment manufactured in Iran
