= Hormuz-2 (missile) =

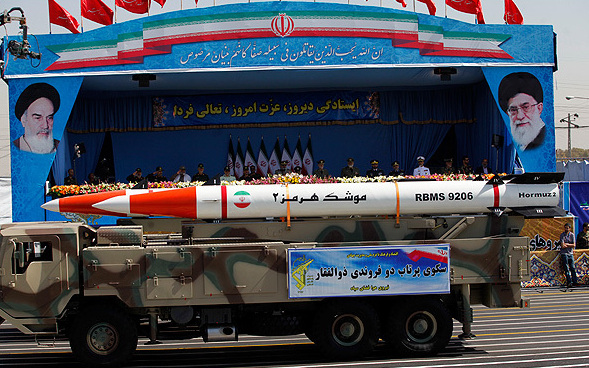
- Hormuz-2 missiles
- Type: ASBM, ARM
- Place of origin: Iran

Production history
- Variants: Hormuz-1; Hormuz-2

Specifications
- Propellant: Solid fuel
- Operational range: 300 km
- Guidance system: Terminal guidance(Active or Passive)
- Launch platform: TEL

Hormuz-2 (Persian: موشک هرمز-2) is an Iranian naval (strike) ballistic missile. The range of this Iranian missile is approximately 300 km. It was revealed in a defense exhibition on 11 May 2014 and is believed to be an Anti-radiation derivative of Fateh-110 tactical ballistic missile having Terminal guidance instead of Electro-Optical guidance.

In March 2017, it was reported that this domestically made ballistic missile dubbed “Hormuz-2” was fired.

Hormuz-2's appearance is mentioned to be very similar to the missile of Persian Gulf (Khalije-Fars) which is a supersonic quasi ballistic anti-ship missile, which is reported to be able of targeting warships.

In October 2026, General Ali Belali highlighted Iran's progress in developing weapons independently, using the Hormoz missile as an example. He mentioned ongoing reverse engineering of captured US equipment, a practice that began years ago and continues today.

== See also ==
- Hormuz-1 (missile)
- Fateh-110
- Islamic Republic of Iran Armed Forces
- Defense industry of Iran
- List of military equipment manufactured in Iran
- Science and technology in Iran
- DRDO Rudram
- List of equipment of the Iranian Army
- Armed Forces of the Islamic Republic of Iran
- Aerospace Force of the Army of the Guardians of the Islamic Revolution
- Defense industry of Iran
- Equipment of the Iranian Army
- Great Prophet III (military exercise)
- Great Prophet IX
