= Arman (missile system) =

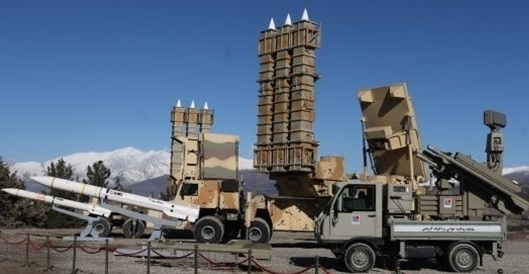
- Arman system (beside Azarakhsh)
- Type: Mobile anti-ballistic missile system
- Place of origin: Iran

Production history
- Designer: Aerospace Industries Organization of the Ministry of Defense
- Manufacturer: Iran
- Unit cost: Not Mentioned
- Produced: February 2024

Specifications
- Mass: 1000 kg
- Effective firing range: 120 km
- Flight altitude: 27 km
- Maximum speed: Mach 4.5 – 5.1

The Arman (full name: Arman long-range anti-ballistic missile system) is an anti-ballistic defense system built by the Iranian Ministry of Defense and the support of the armed forces of the Islamic Republic of Iran.

== Features ==
The features of this system include:

- The ability to detect targets within 180 kilometers
- The ability to track targets up to a distance of 160 km
- The time it takes for this system to be ready for battle is less than 3 minutes
- A Maximum target detection of up to 24 targets
- The ability to cover 360 degrees and engage simultaneously with 6 different targets
- The Arman system has the potential to engage directly with various types of cruise missiles, and drones, as well as the ability to engage with short-range ballistic missiles.

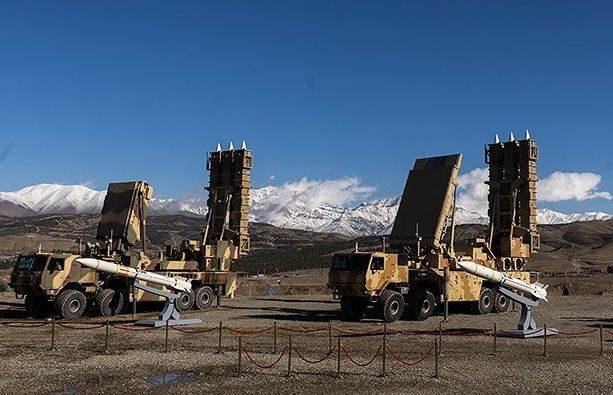
AESA (Najm-804) radar and PESA (Joshan radar)

There are two versions of the Iranian defense system, each equipped with different radars. One version utilizes a passive radar carrier, while the other model features an active radar. The Arman system employs Sayad-3F missiles. The introduction of this defense system in Iran aims to enhance the air defense capabilities of the Islamic Republic. The unveiling ceremony for the Arman defense system took place on February 17, 2024, with the presence of Iranian Brigadier General Mohammad Reza Qaraei Ashtiani, the Minister of Defense and Armed Forces Support.

== See also ==
- List of military equipment manufactured in Iran
- Islamic Republic of Iran Armed Forces
- Defense industry of Iran
- Islamic Revolutionary Guard Corps Aerospace Force
- Aerospace Industries Organization
