= Hormuz-1 (missile) =

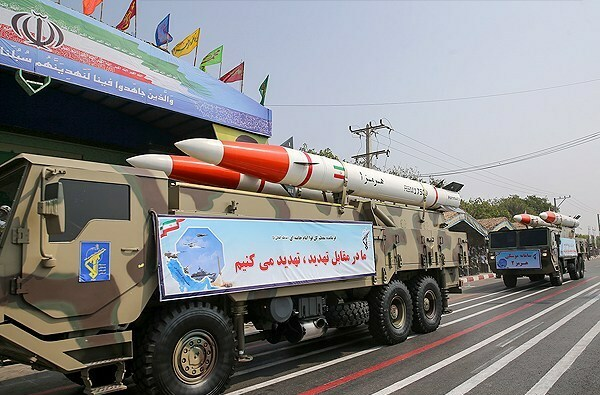
- Two Iranian Hormuz-1 missiles on a TEL. The missiles in the background are Hormuz-2 missiles.
- Type: ASBM, ARM
- Place of origin: Iran

Production history
- Variants: Hormuz-1; Hormuz-2

Specifications
- Operational range: 300 km
- Maximum speed: 4-5 mach
- Guidance system: Terminal guidance (Active or Passive)
- Launch platform: TEL

Hormuz-1 (Persian: موشک هرمز-۱) is an Iranian anti-radar ballistic missile which has the capability of destroying radars on aircraft carrier, MIM-104 Patriot missile sites and air defence or search radar sites, according to Brigadier General Amir Ali Hajizadeh, former commander of the Air Force of the Islamic Revolutionary Guard Corps.

Hormuz-1 has been made by Armed Forces of the Islamic Republic of Iran (designed by General Hassan Tehrani Moghaddam), and is capable of annihilating a 20-foot container from a distance of 300 kilometers.

According to the commander of the Revolutionary Guards Air Force and also based on its similarity to the Khalije-Fars and Fateh-110 missiles, it is estimated that the range of the Hormuz-1 is 300 kilometers, and its speed is 4 to 5 mach. The Hormuz-1 is capable of carrying a warhead weight of about 600 kilograms. It mainly targets moving targets at sea.

== See also ==
- Hormuz-2 (missile)
- Fateh-110
- List of military equipment manufactured in Iran
- Science and technology in Iran
