= Majid (air defense system) =

Short-range Iranian Air defense system

Majid Air Defense System
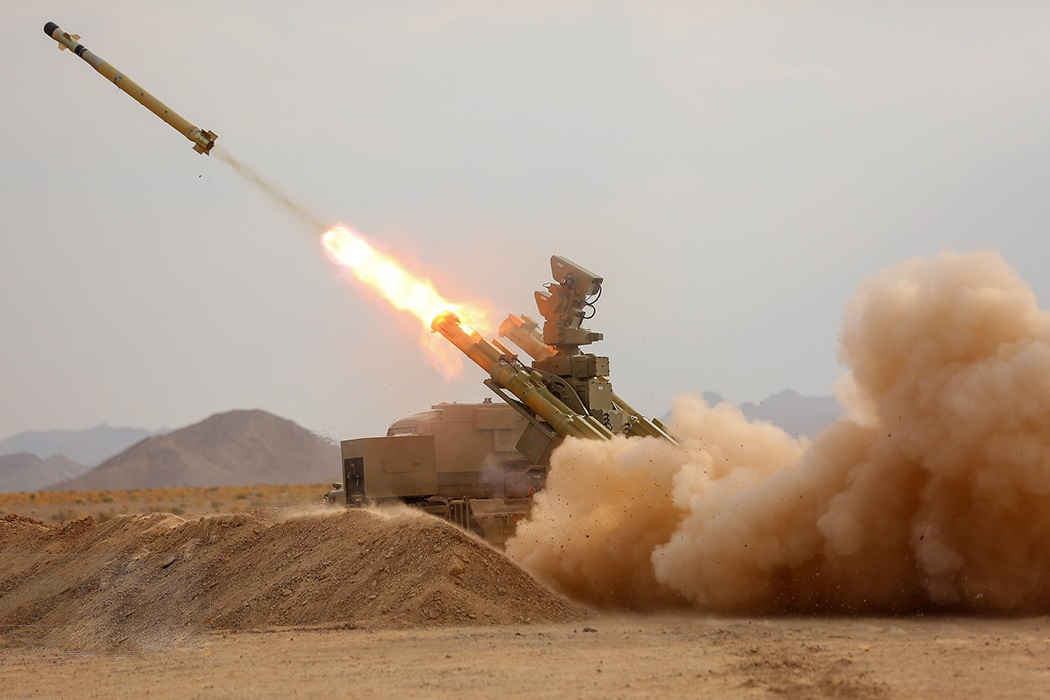
- Type: Air Defense System
- Place of origin: Iran

Service history
- In service: 2021 - Present
- Used by: Islamic Republic of Iran Air Defense Force
- Wars: Twelve-Day War; 2026 Iran War

Specifications
- Effective firing range: 8 km
- Flight altitude: 6 km
- Maximum speed: Mach 2

The Majid air defense weapon system, also known as AD-08, is a short-range, low altitude surface-to-air missile system developed by Iran's defense industries organization. The Majid system made its initial appearance during a parade on April 18, 2021, and was subsequently utilized in the military exercises known as 'Defenders of the Sky of Velayat 1400' in the same year.

== Naming ==
Majid is a name derived from Majid Ghorbankhani as a Holy Shrine Defender.

== Features ==
The Majid short-range air defence system is capable of operating in all weather conditions and can simultaneously target and launch missiles against four different threats such as drones, cruise missiles, helicopters and other low-maneuvering targets. The Majid weapon system consists of four main components: an electro-optical system for target identification and tracking, a fire control command system, a launcher with four missile compartments and AD-08 air defense missiles. The main component of this system is the target detection and tracking mechanism, where an electro-optical system is responsible for identifying targets and guiding the system. The system has a detection range of 15 km and can monitor a full 360 degrees horizontally as well as an altitude range of 0 to 12 degrees. The missiles used in the Majid system, known as AD-08 missiles, are capable of engaging targets at a maximum range of 8 km and an altitude of up to 6 km. The air defense system comprised two missiles along with an airborne radiation detection system mounted on an Aras 2 vehicle. The guidance of these missiles is passive (without wave propagation) and uses an imaging infrared seeker with proximity fuses, which increases the reliability of the system in destroying the intended targets.

== Operational history ==
=== Twelve-Day War ===
According to Tehran Times, the Majid short-range air defence system was used during the 2025 Twelve-Day War to shoot down Israeli drones operating above Iranian airspace, shooting down 17 Israeli UAVs.

On 28 May 2026, Armenia publicly displayed Iran's AD-08 Majid short-range air defense system during Republic Day celebrations in Yerevan, becoming the first known foreign operator of the system. The appearance of the system marked the first confirmed export of the Majid AD-08 to a foreign military.

== Operators ==
- Armenia - Armenian Armed Forces: First seen at the May 28, 2026 military parade.

== See also ==
- Tabas (air defense system)
- Arman (missile system)
- Azarakhsh
