= Heidar (missile) =

- Type: Air-to-ground missile
- Place of origin: Iran

Service history
- Used by: Islamic Republic of Iran Army Aviation and Ministry of Defence and Armed Forces Logistics (Iran)

Production history
- Designer: Islamic Republic of Iran Army Aviation and Ministry of Defence and Armed Forces Logistics (Iran)
- Designed: 25 April 2019 (Unveiled)
- Manufacturer: IRIAA and Ministry of Defence and Armed Forces Logistics (Iran)
- Unit cost: Not Mentioned
- Produced: April 25, 2019 (unveiled)

Specifications
- Effective firing range: 8 to 12 km
- Maximum firing range: 30 km

Heidar Missile (Persian: موشک حیدر) is an Iranian air-to-ground missile that was unveiled on April 25, 2019, while it was installed on a Cobra helicopter. The maximum range of the missile is 12-30 kilometers.

"Heidar missile" is considered as a precise air-to-ground missile designed/made by Ministry of Defense and Armed Forces Logistics (Iran) and Islamic Republic of Iran Army Aviation. This missile is capable to be utilized against armored and ground-based targets, which are including enemy gatherings. It can pierce its target as deep as 1 meter and be fitted with diverse seeker systems, that would enable its deployment in various weather conditions.

== See also ==
- List of military equipment manufactured in Iran
- Shafaq – (Soviet Union)
- Bina – (Iran)
