= Qare'a (rocket launcher) =

- Type: Disposable rocket launcher
- Place of origin: Iran

Service history
- Used by: IRGC

Production history
- Designed: 28 June 2020 (Unveiled)
- Manufacturer: Ground Forces of the Islamic Revolutionary Guard Corps
- Produced: 28 June 2020 (the unveiling date)

Specifications
- Mass: 8 kg (18 lb)
- Caliber: 80 mm
- Maximum firing range: 300 m (0.2 mi)

The Qare'a (disposable) rocket launcher (Persian: راکت‌انداز یکبارمصرف قارعه) is an Iranian lightweight composite material disposable rocket launcher which has been designed in order to target fortifications. Qare'a rocket launcher, made by IRGC, was unveiled on June, 28, 2020 besides 2 other domestically-manufactured military equipment samples.

According to Tasnim, General Ali Koohestani, the head of "the Self-Sufficiency Jihad Organization" of the Islamic Revolution Guards Corps Ground Force, mentioned that Qare'a is an 8-kilogram launcher, applied by technology of soft launching ... the missile is ejected non-explosively. This disposable rocket launcher is in an 80mm caliber version and the effective range of this disposable rocket-launcher is approximately 250 meters.

== See also ==
- Nazir rocket launcher (robot)
