= Akhgar (missile) =

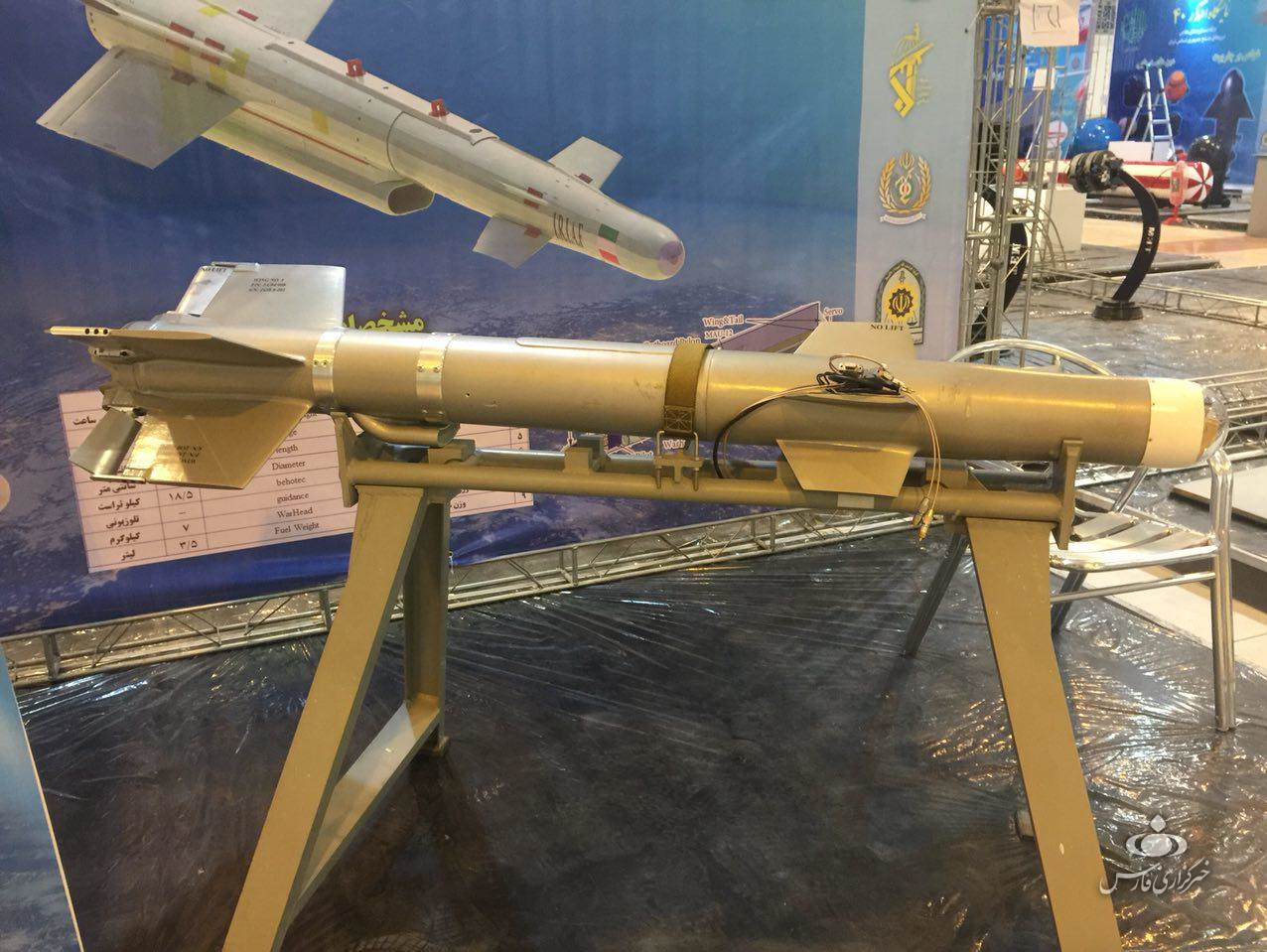
- Type: Air-to-ground missile (UAV missile)
- Place of origin: Iran

Production history
- Unit cost: Not Mentioned
- Produced: 2018

Specifications
- Mass: 27 kg
- Length: 1.7 m
- Diameter: 13 cm
- Maximum firing range: 30 km
- Warhead weight: 7 kg
- Maximum speed: 600 km/h
- Guidance system: Optical guidance

Akhgar missile (Persian: موشک اخگر) is an Iranian drone-launched air-to-ground missile operated by the Islamic Republic of Iran Air Force. This Unmanned aerial vehicle weapon, which is among the newest missiles of Iranian drones, has a range of 30 km, its weight is twenty seven kg and its maximum speed is 600 kilometers per hour.

Akhgar weighs 27 kilograms and is armed with a 7kg warhead, its length is 1.7 m and it has a diameter of 13 cm. The unmanned aerial vehicle missile is of the television-guidance type and its engine is made from the type of "micro-jet engine". This missile can be installed on the Kaman-12 (UAV), which is capable of carrying/firing from a distance of 30 kilometers by the UAV to various targets. The unveiling of this UAV-missile took place on 30 January 2019 in the "Iqtedar 40" exhibition, corresponding to the defense achievements of the Iranian Armed Forces.

== See also ==
- List of military equipment manufactured in Iran
- Armed Forces of the Islamic Republic of Iran
- Defense industry of Iran
- Kaman-12 (UAV)
- Almas (missile)
