= Fath Safir =

Safir
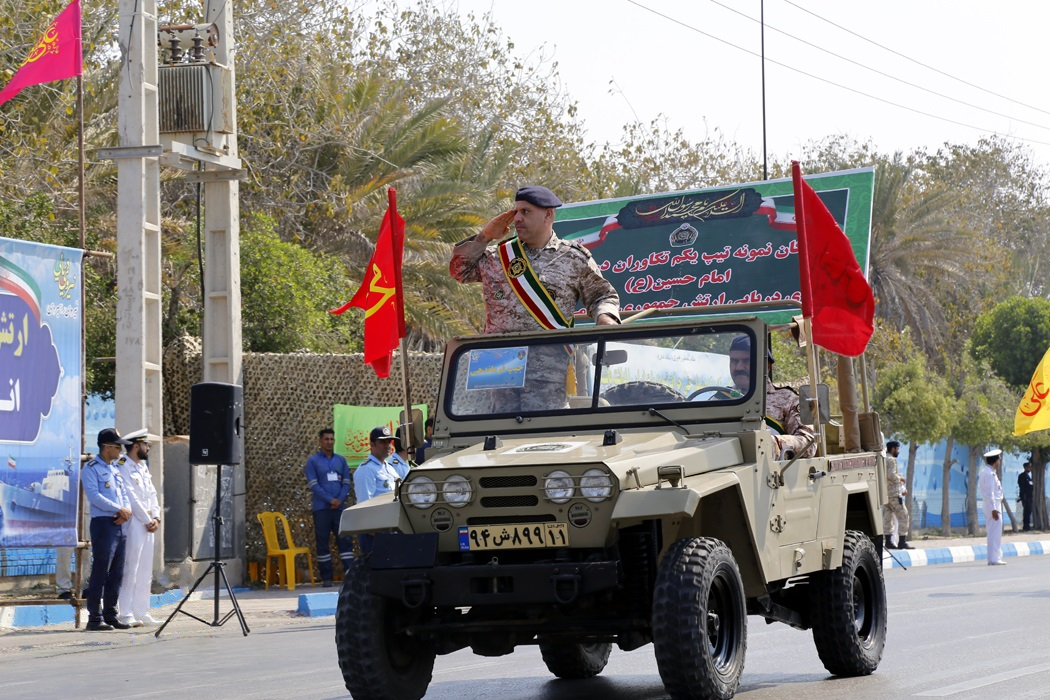
- A Safir during an Iranian military parade, 2023.
- Type: Multipurpose military vehicle
- Place of origin: Islamic Republic of Iran; Republic of Sudan (1985–2019)

Service history
- Used by: See Operators

Production history
- Manufacturer: Fath Vehicle Industries
- Produced: 2008-Present (Iran); 2013-Present (Sudan)
- Variants: See Variants

Specifications
- Mass: 1.62 tonnes. 2.35 tonnes fully loaded
- Length: 3.726 m
- Width: 1.69 m
- Height: 1.88 m
- Crew: 1 (+5 passengers)
- Main armament: 12x Fajr 1 107 mm rockets, or a 106 mm recoilless rifle or a Toophan anti-tank missile launcher
- Engine: Nissan Z24 diesel engine 105 hp
- Power/weight: 44.68 hp/tonne
- Suspension: Coil spring
- Operational range: 500 km
- Maximum speed: 130 km/h

Safir (Persian: سفیر; Arabic: سَفِيْر, romanized: Safīr, meaning "traveler") is an Iranian 4x4 multipurpose military vehicle built by Fath Vehicle Industries. The Safir weighs 1.5 tonne and is based on the M38. The jeep can be distinguished from the M38 due to the sharp angled body panels, hood and grille.

It has been supplied to Iraq via militia forces since it is inexpensive and affordable to produce them in mass numbers.

== History ==
The Safir was officially unveiled in 2008. In the ceremony, Iranian defense minister said that 3,000 Safirs were built in that year, and Fath industries would deliver 5,000 more vehicles to defense industry per year. The jeep was seen in public media outside of Iran with its use under pro-Iranian militias fighting against Islamic State.

Sudan makes the Safir under license as the Karaba VTG01, which was publicly shown to visitors at the IDEX 2013 convention in the United Arab Emirates.

== Variants ==
Safir has a modular build and has many models. These include:

- A version equipped with 12 Fajr 1 107 mm rocket tubes.
- A version equipped with a 106 mm recoilless rifle (M40) for use against enemy armored vehicles
- A model equipped with a Toophan anti-tank missile launcher to counter enemy tanks
- A model equipped with 9K11 Malyutka anti-tank missiles (Probably Iranian produced Ra'ad)
- A model equipped with Tosan anti-tank missiles
- A variant equipped with a Grenade launcher
- Command vehicle
- Ambulance
- Radio wave emitter
- Tracked variant for snowy terrain
- Safir-4 with extended chassis

== Operators ==
- Iran: Used by the Iranian military.
- Iraq: Provided Safirs to PMF paramilitary.
- Sudan: Made under license as Karaba VTG01.
- Syria: Seen in use with Syrian Armed Forces.
- Libya: Used by the Libyan National Army.

=== Non-state actors ===
- Known to be used by Kata'ib Hezbollah, the Badr Army and Peshmerga forces.
- Known to be used by ISIL and Tahrir al-Sham, captured from Iraqi PMF paramilitaries and Syrian government forces, respectively.
- Harakat Hezbollah al-Nujaba
- Kata'ib Sayyid al-Shuhada
- Asa'ib Ahl al-Haq
- Liwa al-Zulfiqar
- Liwa Fatemiyoun
- Saraya Ansar al-Aqeeda
- Saraya al-Salam
- Saraya Ashura
- Saraya al-Khorasani
