= Nasr-e Basir =

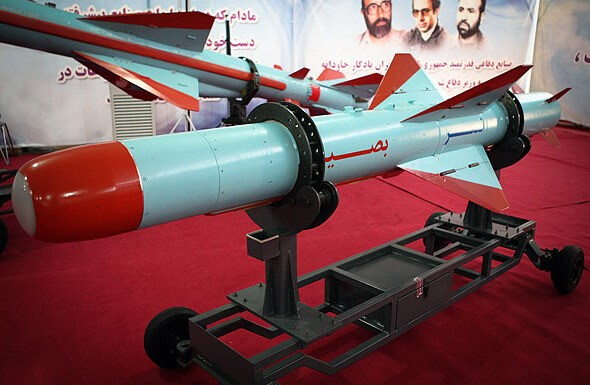
- Type: Anti-ship Cruise missile
- Place of origin: Iran

Service history
- In service: 2014-present
- Used by: IRGC

Specifications
- Operational range: 35 km?
- Guidance system: Fire and forget

Nasr-e Basir is an Iranian anti-ship cruise missile that was unveiled on August 24, 2014, during a defense exhibition in Tehran, along with other military equipment such as Ghadir missile, Karrar-4 MALE UAV, and Mohajer-4 UAV. It is an indigenous smart low-observable missile designed to target ships.

== See also ==
- Noor
- Khalij Fars
- Hormoz-2
