= Fath Vehicle Industries =

Iranian automobile company

- Industry: Automotive
- Headquarters: Tehran, Iran
- Parent: Vafa Doust Industrial Group

Fath Vehicle Industries (Persian: صنایع خودروسازی فتح) is an Iranian motor vehicle manufacturer.

== History ==
The company is based in Tehran, Iran, and is part of the VIG Group (Vafa Doust Industrial Group). In 1995, Fath began producing SUVs under its own brand name. In addition, the company also manufactures military vehicles.

- 2000 — 100 passenger cars manufactured
- 2001 — 500 passenger cars manufactured
- 2002 — 750 passenger cars manufactured
- 2003 — 500 cars and 500 pick-ups delivered

== Models ==
=== Sahand Cruiser ===
- Sahand Cruiser

The Fath Sahand Cruiser is a license built Toyota Land Cruiser 70 Series. The first version was a pickup. In 2000, the added combination Kian station the range. In 2003, a Cabriolet called convertible was introduced.

The vehicles are powered by a diesel engine with a 4000 cc displacement, delivering 102 kW (137 hp ).

=== Fath Safir ===
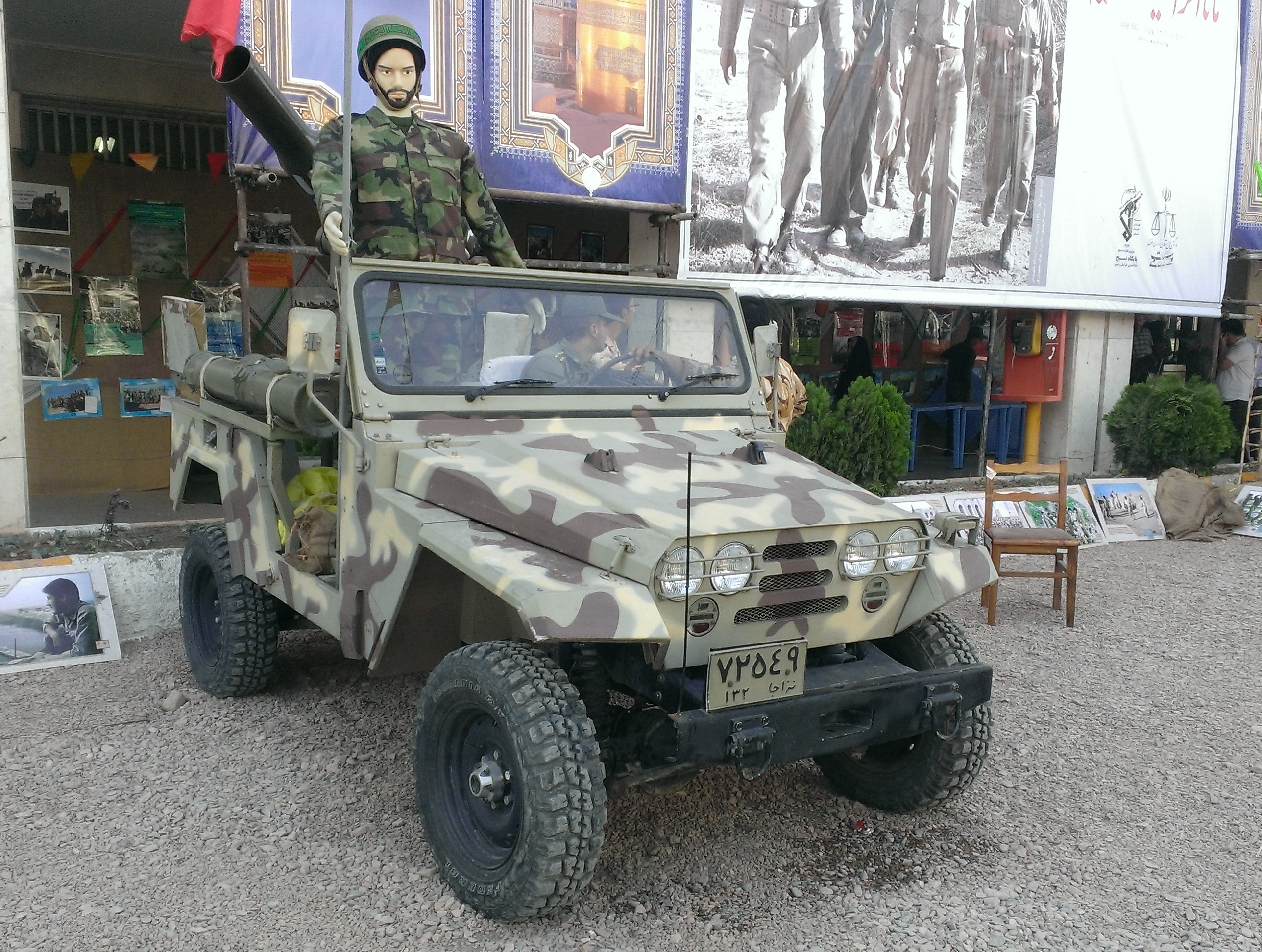
Fath Safir

The Jeep-like Safir is a Jeep-like military vehicle with all-wheel drive.
