= Ghamar (3D radar) =

Iranian military radar

- Country of origin: Iran
- No. built: Not mentioned
- Type: multi-stage 3D radar
- Range: 450 km
- Elevation: Low and high altitudes
- Power: Intercepting over 100 targets
- Other names: Can also be named "Qamar"

Ghamar (3D radar) (Persian: رادار سه بعدی قمر) is an Iranian radar system. This radar can coverage and search in three dimensions (3D) and distance of more than 450 kilometers. Ghamar can track more than 100 targets such as fighter aircraft and drones. The radar send data to Absar video-imaging system that can set up on fighter jets and drones. Ghamar radar were unveiled with another defense products during the ceremony by Brigadier General Hossein Dehghan, Iran's defense minister.

== See also ==
- List of military equipment manufactured in Iran
- Samen (radar)
- Islamic Republic of Iran Armed Forces
- Defense industry of Iran
- List of equipment of the Iranian Army
- Iran Electronics Industries
