= Talaiyeh (missile) =

Talaiyeh Missile
- Type: Strategic cruise missile system

Service history
- In service: 2023 (Unveiled)

Production history
- Manufacturer: Iran (Islamic Republic of Iran Navy)

Specifications
- Length: Not Mentioned
- Operational range: Over 1000 Km
- Guidance system: A smart missile that can change targets mid-mission

Talaiyeh missile (Persian: موشک طلائیه) (full name: Talaiyeh strategic cruise missile system) is an Iranian missile system that has a range of more than 1000 km; and it is a smart missile that can change targets mid-mission.

The mentioned missile has the ability to select the desired targets through the missile itself. This mother system also has a high capability to surprise its targets.

== See also ==
- Military of Iran
- Defense industry of Iran
