= Zoobin =

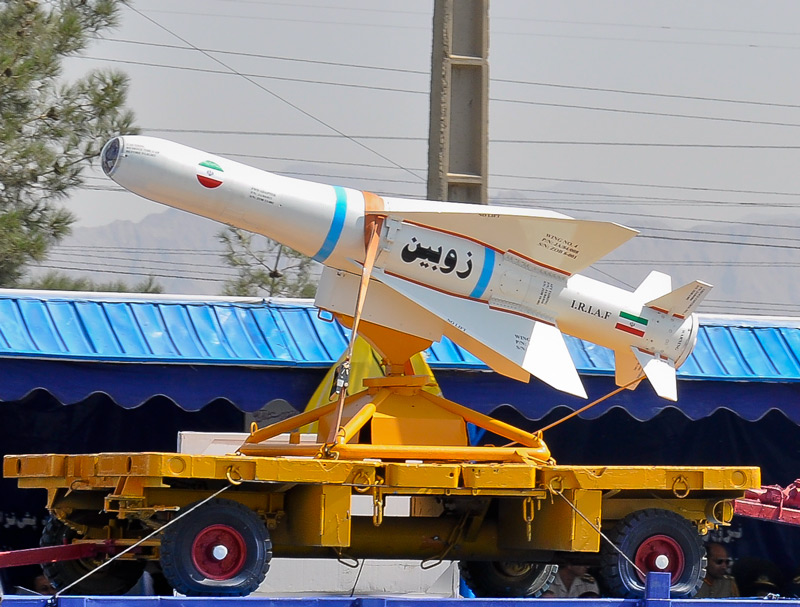
- Type: Air-to-surface missile

Service history
- In service: From Iran–Iraq War to present
- Used by: Iran

Production history
- Manufacturer: Iran

Specifications
- Mass: 560 kg
- Length: 3.18 m
- Diameter: 408 mm
- Wingspan: 1.23 m
- Warhead: Tritonal or Minol 360kg warhead
- Engine: Solid rocket engine
- Operational range: 20 km
- Guidance system: TV-homing

Zoobin (Javelin) is an Iranian TV-guided air-to-surface missile. It is considered to be the first generation of the Iranian PGMs. Developed during the time of Iran–Iraq War, it was a rocket-powered version of the American M117 bomb equipped with a TV-seeker. There are four small aerodynamic control surfaces, also in a cruciform pattern, mounted on the motor, which are connected to the guidance unit at the front of the missile via control lines running along the body. The first versions only relied on these four fins, but it was found that the missile is too unstable. Thus, four larger triangle-shaped fins were attached to the center of the body to provide stability.

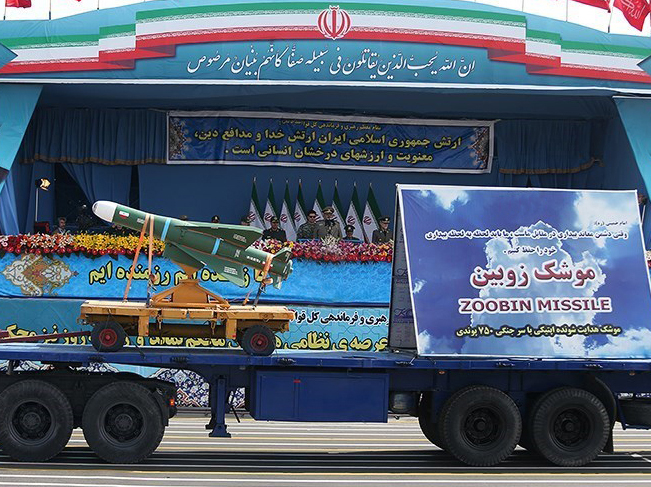
A Zoobin missile at a parade

The guidance unit at the front of the missile contains a daylight TV seeker that is the same one used on Qadr. Zoobin is given a US-style 'AGM' designation (AGM-379/20 Zoobin), though its designers say that this has no greater significance beyond inventory management and parts stocks.

Both Iranian F-4 Phantoms and F-5 Tigers can be equipped by Zoobin though the latter needs a modification to be able to guide the missile.

== See also ==
- List of military equipment manufactured in Iran
- List of equipment of the Iranian Army
- List of aircraft of the Iranian Air Force
