= Nazir rocket launcher (robot) =

Type of rocket artillery

Nazir rocket launcher robot
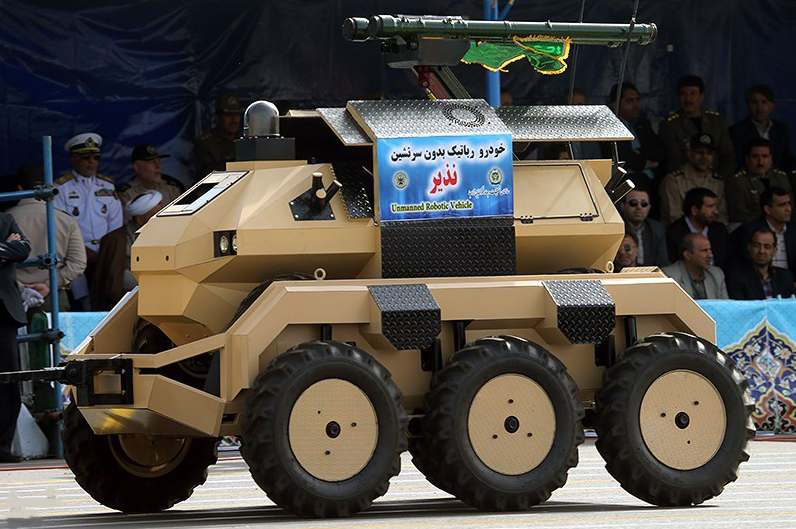
- Type: Rocket Launcher
- Place of origin: Iran

Service history
- Used by: Islamic Republic of Iran Army Ground Forces

Production history
- Produced: 12 September 2015 (unveiled)
- No. built: not mentioned

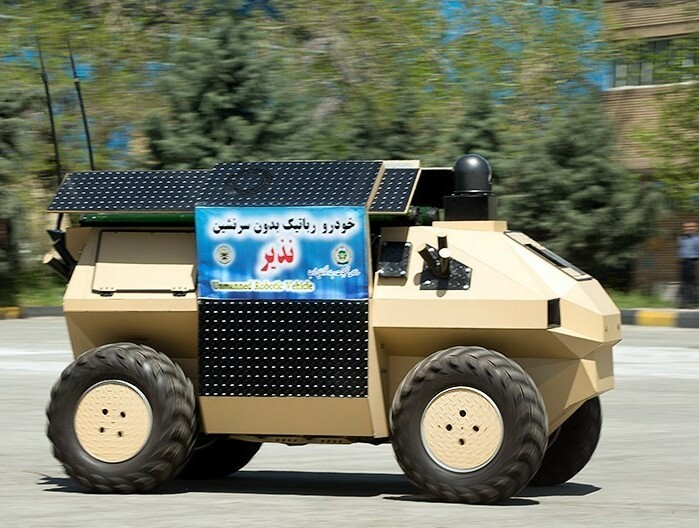
Nazir rocket launcher robot; four-wheeled model

Nazir rocket launcher (robot) (Persian: ربات موشک‌انداز نذیر) is an armed robot, made by Islamic Republic of Iran Army Ground Forces, unveiled on 12 September 2015. This remote-controlled missile launcher is capable of carrying two missiles and approximately 600 kg of cargo; it can also perform missions based on instant planning/control.

The operating radius of this unmanned armed robot in the first phase is about two km. This UGV which possesses radio-guided capabilities, has a range of about four kilometers and can carry out its duty unexpectedly at air/ground operational levels.

== unveil ==
The Republic of Iran announced the Nazir robot in 2015, but the date of its inauguration dates back to the year 2016, when the ground force of the Army of the Iranian Republic launched three achievements, including an armed robot vehicle that is controlled remotely, which is the vehicle (Nazir Robot).

== Properties ==
Nazir's armed robot can walk without a passenger and in a four-wheel drive manner. This robot is a moving mechanism that can be controlled and operated remotely. The characteristics of this robot also include carrying a weight of no less than 600 kilograms and placing a medium weapon on it.

== See also ==
- List of military equipment manufactured in Iran
- Armed Forces of the Islamic Republic of Iran
- Defense industry of Iran
