= Farpad (drone) =

Iranian drone

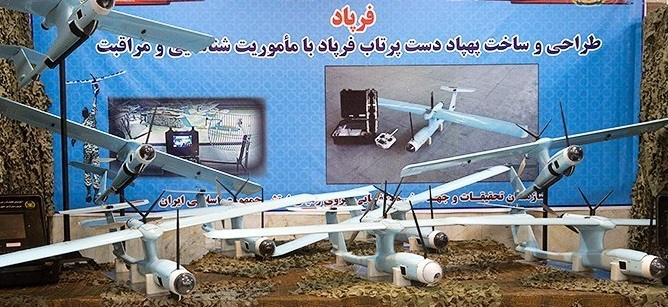
- Hand-launched UAV

General information
- Manufacturer: Islamic Republic of Iran Army Ground Forces
- Designer: Islamic Republic of Iran Army Ground Forces
- Primary user: Iran

History
- Introduction date: 3 October 2019 (Unveiling)

Farpad (drone) (Persian: پهپاد فرپاد) is an Iranian hand-launched unmanned aerial vehicle; which was unveiled by the Iranian Army during the military drills underway in Iran’s strategic southeastern areas. This drone is able to fly as far as 20 kilometers for 45 minutes.

== Name ==
This domestically-manufactured drone, dubbed ‘Farpad,’ (فرپاد) is considered as the latest surveillance-aircraft of its sort to join the battery of Islamic Republic of Iran Army Ground Forces (NEZAJA), the acronym derived from the Persian name of the Army’s Ground Forces.

== Abilities ==
This hand-launched unmanned aerial vehicle can fly as far as twenty kilometers (equivalent to twelve miles) for a period of time – in 45 minutes. Farpad's weight is approximately 4 kg. This drone is utilized in reconnaissance missions and is able of either storing-information or transferring-data via online connection. In case of jamming --attacks-- by the enemy, this unmanned aerial vehicle would be returned to the (war) base, by utilizing its specific autopilot.

== See also ==
- List of military equipment manufactured in Iran
- Islamic Republic of Iran Army Ground Forces
