= Abu Mahdi (missile) =

"Martyr Abu-Mahdi" cruise missile
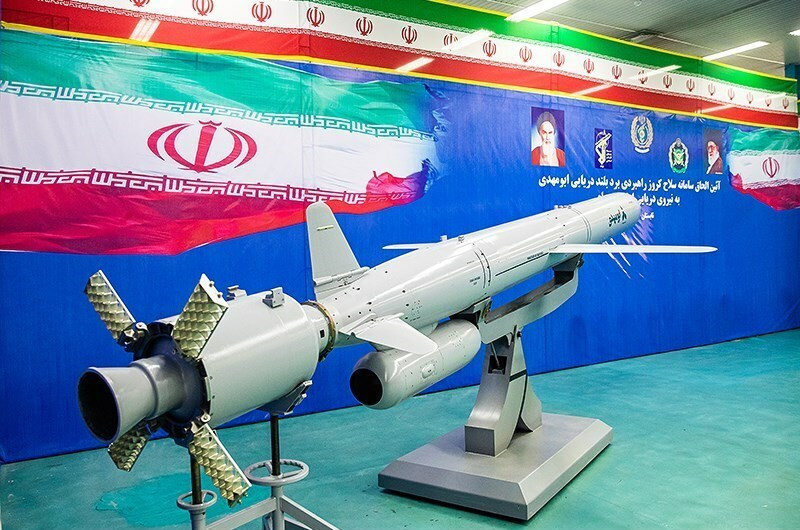
- Abu Mahdi missile
- Type: Cruise missile
- Place of origin: Iran

Service history
- In service: 20 August 2020
- Used by: Iran

Specifications
- Warhead: High Explosive

Abu Mahdi (Persian: موشک ابومهدی), complete name: "Shahid (Martyr) Abu-Mahdi al-Muhandis missile" (Persian: موشک شهید ابومهدی المهندس), is an Iranian naval cruise missile. The missile is named after Abu Mahdi al-Muhandis, an Iraqi companion of Qasem Soleimani who was killed in an American airstrike in 2020. It was unveiled on 20 August 2020 simultaneously with the Haj-Qasem missile. The Abu Mahdi missile can be launched by diverse types of platforms, including sea, land and air launchers.

== See also ==
- Ministry of Defence and Armed Forces Logistics (Iran)
- Nasr-e Basir
