= H-110 Sarir =

Iranian unmanned combat aerial vehicle

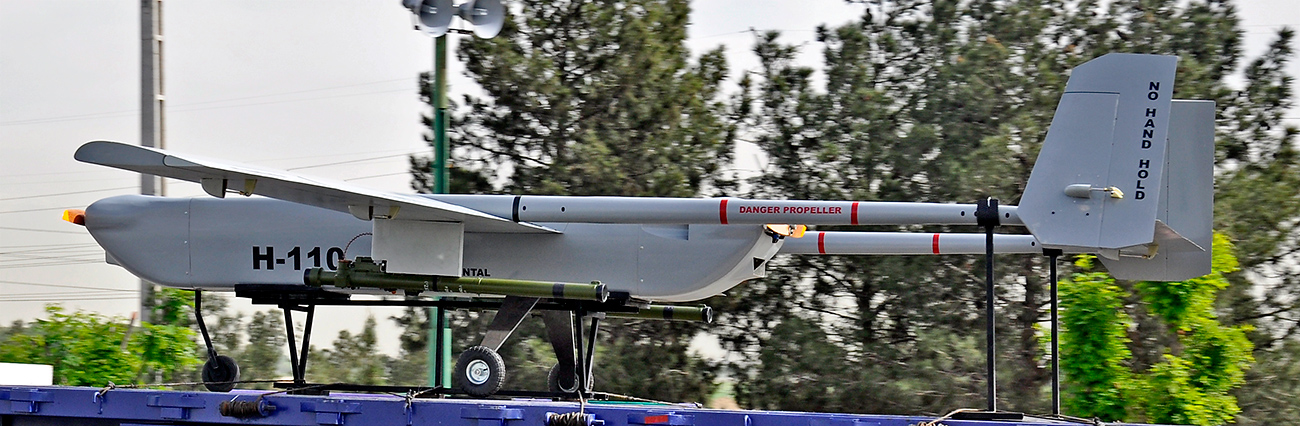

General information
- Type: Unmanned combat air vehicle
- Status: In service
- Primary user: Islamic Republic of Iran Air Defense Force
- Number built: at least 10 in January 2021

History
- Introduction date: 2013

The H-110 Sarir (Persian: سریر, meaning "Throne") was an Iranian UAV which was unveiled in a ceremony in April 2013 by IRIA. The UAV is optimized for intelligence, surveillance and reconnaissance roles using electro-optic and infra-red sensors. Iranian state media reports suggest it may be capable of carrying air-to-air weapons; however, independent verification of this has yet to emerge. The aircraft is fitted with twin inboard wing pylons to support stores carriage.

Range and endurance data for the type remains unclear. Iranian state media have claimed the UAV has stealth characteristics however its use of twin propellers, in a tractor-pusher configuration, would have the direct result of creating a very large radar cross section, as would its external stores pylons. Likewise the airframe fails to exhibit recognized low observable shaping such as cantered tail surfaces and blended wing body structures.

== Status ==
10 are believed to be in service.

== Features ==
The length of the body of the Sarir drone is about 7 meters, its wingspan is 9 meters, and its height is less than 2 meters. This drone is capable of reaching a flight ceiling of 3500 to 5500 meters with a flight duration of between 8 and 12 hours. Its payload capacity is also estimated at about 100 kilograms. Among the outstanding features of this drone are its ability to hide from radar, long range, high operational durability, the ability to carry weapons and cameras, as well as greater flight endurance compared to manned aircraft. This unmanned vehicle has a significant ability to identify targets, carry out operations against them, and also take pictures of enemy positions.

The Sarir UAV is equipped with two piston-propeller engines, one at the front of the fuselage and the other at the end. This UAV is the first and currently the only combat UAV in the country to use such a combination. In its design, a piston-propeller engine at the front is responsible for traction and an engine at the end is responsible for producing thrust. The use of two engines brings major advantages such as increased operational reliability, higher achievable speed, increased flight ceiling and better takeoff power, along with increased cargo capacity. The main reason for using two engines in this UAV is to provide the necessary power for more lift to carry air-to-air missiles; because carrying two missiles under the wings in a UAV of this size can significantly increase air resistance or drag. Placing the thrust and thrust engines simultaneously in the fuselage not only reduces air resistance and the overall weight of the drone compared to the traditional installation of two engines around the wings, but also increases its survivability and reliability, especially on long and high-risk missions. However, using two engines may increase overall fuel consumption compared to a single engine with similar technology.

== See also ==
- Karrar
- Shahed 129
- Unmanned combat air vehicle
- List of military equipment manufactured in Iran
