= IAIO Mobin =

Iranian unmanned aerial vehicle

Mobin
- Type: Unmanned aerial vehicle
- Place of origin: Iran

Service history
- In service: 2018 – present

Production history
- Designer: Iran Aviation Industries Organization

Specifications
- Mass: 670 kg
- Engine: Single shaft turbojet engine
- Payload capacity: 120 kg
- Operational range: 450 km
- Maximum speed: 900 km/h
- Guidance system: TERCOM with DSMAC

The Mobin (Persian: مبین, lit. 'clear' or 'determination') is an Iranian multi-purpose ground-launched unmanned aerial vehicle (UAV). The UAV was first displayed on 27 August 2019 at the MAKS air show held at Zhukovsky International Airport, Russia. The Mobin is the first UAV of its kind in the world, designed to penetrate enemy defenses and get past incoming missiles. The UAV entered service in Iran in 2018 and had been cleared for export.

== Capabilities ==
The Mobin can function as both an attack and reconnaissance drone and is equipped with radar-evading stealth properties. The UAV has a 3 m wingspan and a low radar cross section of less than 0.1 m^{2}. It has an exclusive compartment at the nose section of the body which allows the installation of various warheads weighing up to 120 kg (260 lb), the payload compartment of the missile has a volume of 116 liters. It has a fuel-management system for short, medium and long ranges. It has a range of 450 kilometres (280 mi), weighs 670 kilograms (1,480 lb), and can fly at altitudes between 9.1 metres (30 ft) and 14,000 metres (45,000 ft) for 45 minutes. The maximum speed which the drone can reach is 900 kilometres per hour (560 mph).

The navigation system employed by the Mobin is both the TERCOM and DSMAC systems. The guidance of the drone works in three axes with fully automated take off and landing. DSMAC systems are often combined with TERCOM as a terminal guidance system. A TERCOM system considerably increases the accuracy of the guidance compared with inertial navigation systems (INS). The increased accuracy allows a TERCOM-equipped system to fly closer to obstacles and generally at lower altitudes, making it harder to detect by ground radar.

The Mobin employs the "Toloo-4" turbojet engine. The engine is a single shaft turbojet engine which consists of 3 stage axial compressor, direct annular combustion chamber and 1 stage axial turbine. It weighs 55.9 kg with a diameter of 330mm and length of 1130mm-1330mm. The engine thrust is rated at 345daN with an engine speed of 28500RPM. Its hydro-pneumatic life is rated at 20 hours.

== See also ==
- Armed forces of Iran
- Iran Aviation Industries Organization
- TERCOM
- Unmanned aerial vehicles
