= Azarakhsh (defense system) =

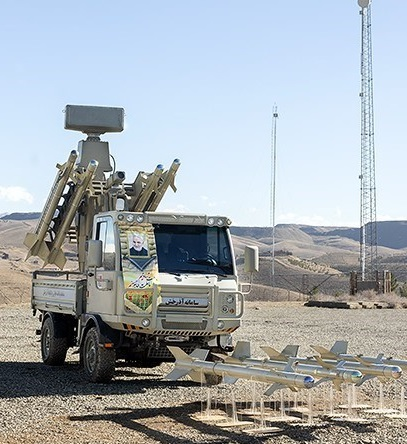
- Type: Short-range Air defense
- Place of origin: Iran

Production history
- Designer: Aerospace Industries Organization of the Ministry of Defense of the Islamic Republic of Iran
- Manufacturer: Ministry of Defense and Armed Forces Logistics (Iran)
- Unit cost: Not mentioned
- Produced: 17 February 2024 (Unveiled date)

Specifications
- Effective firing range: 10 km
- Maximum speed: Mach 1.8
- Guidance system: Phased array radar and electro-optical and thermal system

The Azarakhsh (low-altitude air defense system), developed by the Islamic Republic of Iran, is a short-range air defense system capable of continuously conducting operations. It is equipped with an advanced 3D radar system and advanced searchers and optical search systems. This versatile defense system can be installed on various types of vehicles and is capable of swiftly neutralizing the intended targets. It can be utilized on both fixed and mobile platforms. The lightning radar detection range of this system spans 50 km, while the optical detector operates within a range of 25 km. As per Masoud Zavarei, an assistant at the Defense Industries Organization of the Islamic Republic of Iran, the Iranian system is capable of linking to the air defense network, eliminating a wide range of aerial threats including helicopters and drones, and functioning effectively in diverse weather conditions day and night. It has been specifically designed to address potential threats.

The Iranian Telar system, equipped with electro-optical television and infrared imaging systems, is designed for detection and identification. To detect targets beyond the range of the electro-optical systems, a 360-degree detection radar is utilized to provide the crew with information regarding the direction, distance, and speed of the targets before they come within range of the missile engagement. Additionally, the system is armed with 4 Azarakhsh missiles (Iranian Sidewinder) and a thermal detonator to engage low-flying targets effectively.

== See also ==
- List of military equipment manufactured in Iran
- Islamic Republic of Iran Armed Forces
- Defense industry of Iran
- Islamic Revolutionary Guard Corps Aerospace Force
- Aerospace Industries Organization
