= Homa (helicopter) =

Iranian helicopter

The Homa helicopter is an Iranian helicopter first showcased at the Kish Air Show in 2017. Featuring a traditional Iranian design, it is designed for diverse missions, including mountain operations. Classified as a medium-heavy helicopter, it can accommodate 14 passengers and a crew of two. Its design allows it to be used for training, forestry, search and rescue, air traffic control, oil rig operations, airlift services, and field support.
