= Farnas/IASIA Zohal =

Iranian unmanned aerial vehicle

Zohal (Persian: زحل, "Saturn") is a VTOL unmanned aerial vehicle developed and manufactured in Iran that is being described as a "home-made unmanned flying saucer". The first announcement of the Zohal came in a news release from the Fars News Agency on March 16, 2011. In attendance at the unveiling was Ayatollah Seyed Ali Khamenei, the figurative head of Iran.

The Zohal which can fly in both indoor and outdoor environments is designed and developed jointly by Farnas Aerospace Company and Iranian Aviation and Space Industries Association (IASIA). Technical specifications include an autopilot system and GPS (Global Positioning System).

The utility of the Zohal is described as varied with aerial imaging provided as one example. The imaging equipment consists of two separate systems with full HD 10 mega-pixel picture quality, making the Zohal able to take and send images simultaneously.
