= Shahed 147 =

2023 Iranian drone

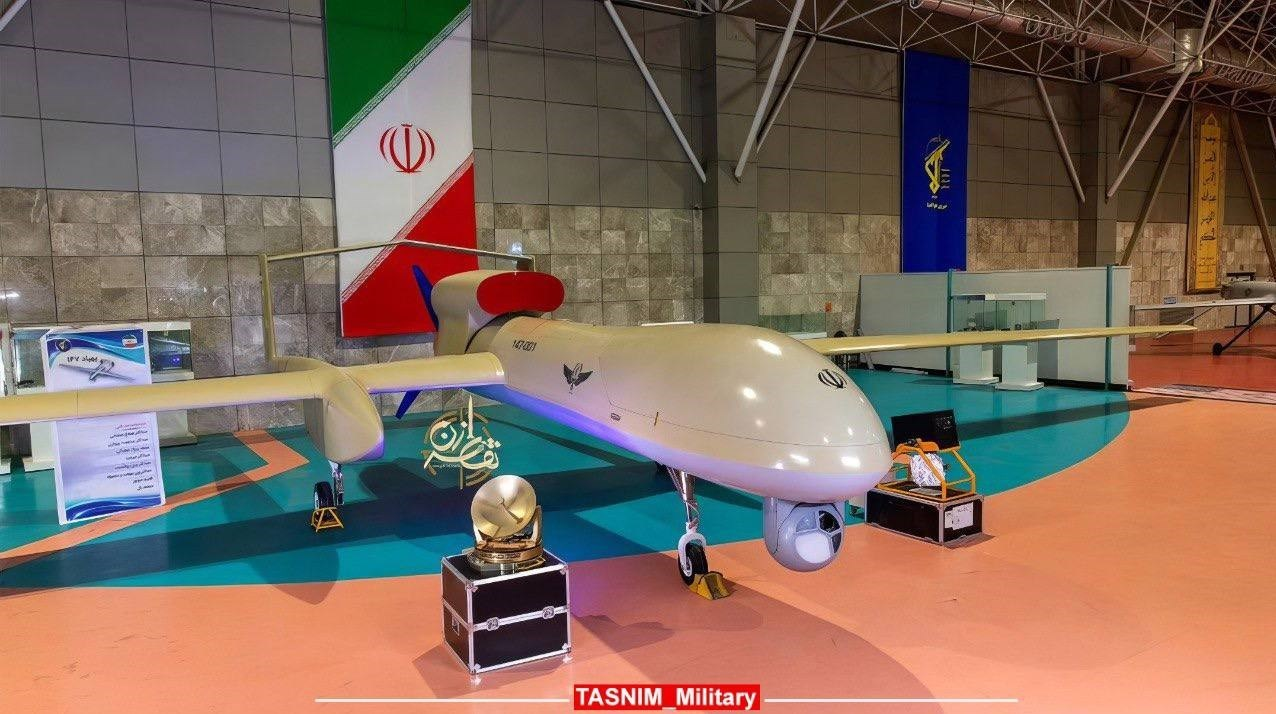
Shahed 147

Shahed 147 is a wide-body, heavy-duty military drone that was unveiled in 2023, during the presence of Seyyed Ali Khamenei at a military exhibition.

According to Mohammad Shaltuki, a journalist close to the Iranian military, the drone has a wingspan of 26 meters and a maximum flight ceiling of 60,000 feet.

== Specifications ==
According to Amir Ali Hajizadeh, Commander of the IRGC Aerospace Force, this aircraft is 26 meters long and can soar to an altitude of 60,000 feet (about 20 kilometers), and has a good intelligence capability. It is said that these flight characteristics are approximately equivalent to the flight altitude of the famous American Global Hawk drone. Among the characteristics of this drone is the use of a turboprop engine, which is the second model in the Shahed family after the Gaza drone. The use of this type of engine, because it has a special turbine, can be more efficient at higher altitudes; on the other hand, it creates a higher speed for the aircraft, which increases the flight ceiling.

The Shahed 147 is also capable of carrying a SAR radar. The fact that the Shahed 147 drone is equipped with advanced synthetic aperture radar (SAR) technology increases its surveillance capabilities to high levels. On the other hand, the SAR capability allows the drone to produce high-resolution images even in difficult weather conditions. The integration of synthetic aperture radar enhances the operational capabilities of the Shahed 147.
