= Persian Gulf (missile) =

Iranian anti-ship ballistic missile

Khalij-e Fars (Persian Gulf)
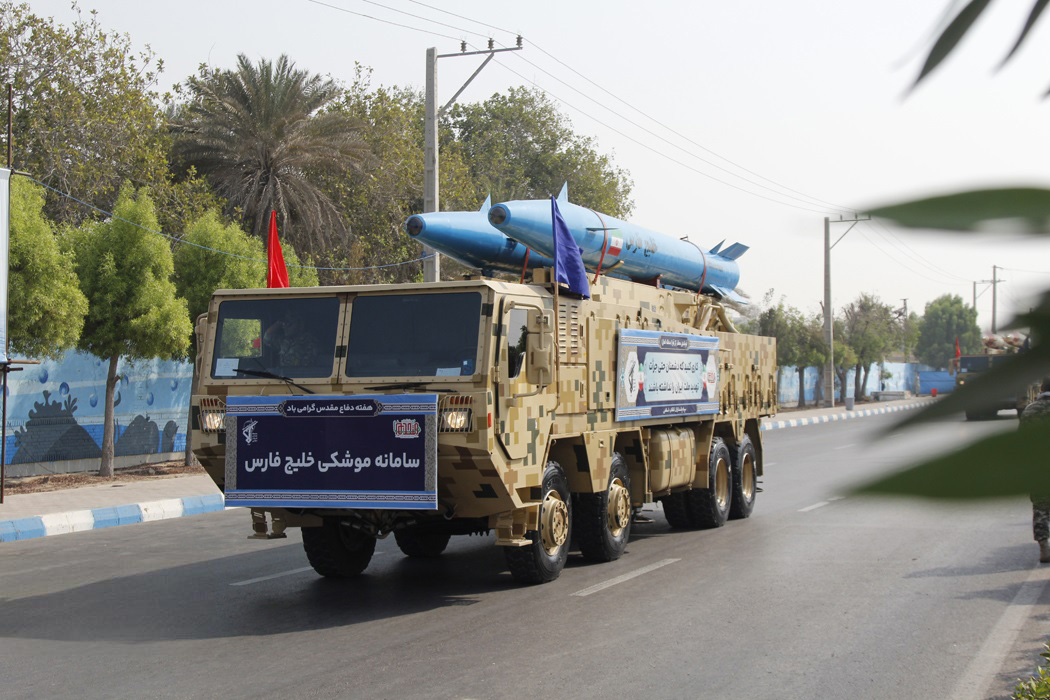
- A Khalij-e Fars missile on a transporter
- Type: Anti-ship ballistic missile

Service history
- In service: 2011–present
- Used by: IRGCASF

Production history
- Manufacturer: Iran

Specifications
- Mass: 3730 kilograms
- Length: 8.86 m
- Diameter: 0.61 m
- Warhead: 650 kg
- Engine: Solid (single stage)
- Operational range: 300 km
- Maximum speed: 4 Mach
- Accuracy: Less than 10 m CEP or 1 – 2 m
- Launch platform: mobile launcher

Khalij-e Fars (Persian: موشک خلیج فارس, "Persian Gulf") is an Iranian single-stage solid-propellant, supersonic anti-ship quasi ballistic missile with a range of 300 km based on the Fateh-110 missile. It is equipped with a 650 kg explosive warhead and an interception evading guidance system.

The missile was unveiled in February 2011 when the Commander of the Islamic Revolutionary Guards Corps, Major General Mohammad Ali Jafari, announced that it is being mass-produced. The Iranian Fars News Agency released a footage of the missile hitting a target ship successfully. The missile was first tested during the Great Prophet III naval wargames in 2008.

There have been two other publicized tests of the missile. One occurred in July 2011 and the other in July 2012. The latter test also showed footage taken by the missile's electro-optical seeker locked onto its target.

== Features and capabilities ==
The missile has an operating range of 300 kilometres (190 mi). It is a single-stage, solid-fuel-propelled vehicle, and is equipped with a 650-kilogram (1,430 lb) explosive warhead that uses a combination of guidance systems to prevent interception. The Persian Gulf has an advanced electronic system that allows the missile to discover and navigate to the target. The missile relies on its own internal navigation system, allowing it to travel without radio interference.

== Comparable systems ==
- Fateh-110 – (Iran)
- LORA – (Israel)
- Tochka – (Soviet Union)
- Hadès – (France)
- Nasr – (Pakistan)
- Oka – (Soviet Union)
- Iskander – (Russia)

== See also ==
- P282 SMASH (Pakistani ASBM)
- Equipment of the Iranian Army
- Defense industry of Iran
- List of military equipment manufactured in Iran
- Science and technology in Iran
- Great Prophet III (military exercise)
- Great Prophet IX
- Kheibarshekan
