= Bina (missile) =

2014 missile model by Iran

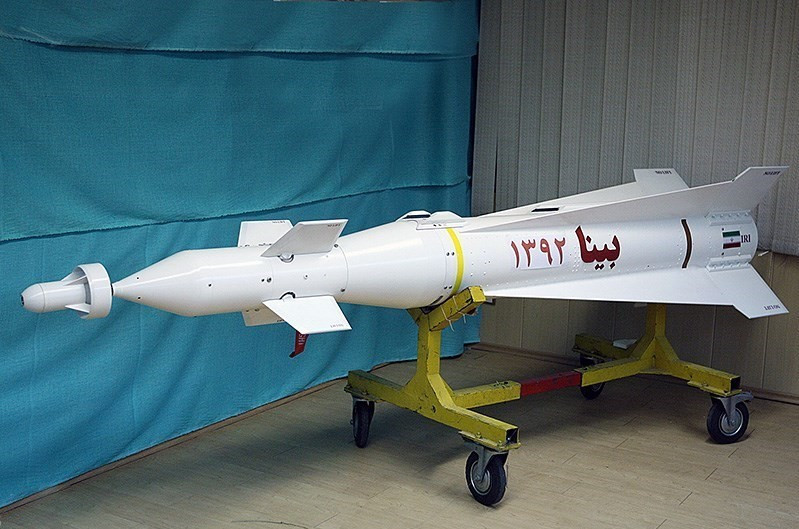
Bina missile, 2014

Bina (Persian: بینا, lit. 'insightful') is an Iranian laser-guided dual-capability surface-to-surface and air-to-surface missile.

== History ==
It was successfully tested by Iranian military on February 10, 2014, according to Janes and Reuters. It appears to be an AGM-65 Maverick air-to-ground missile with a semi-active laser (SAL) seeker fitted to its nose.

Brigadier General Hossein Dehqan said the ballistic missile had radar-evading capabilities.

The Bina-2 air-to-surface missile was unveiled in 2018 which has increased its precision and range.
