= Tosan (missile) =

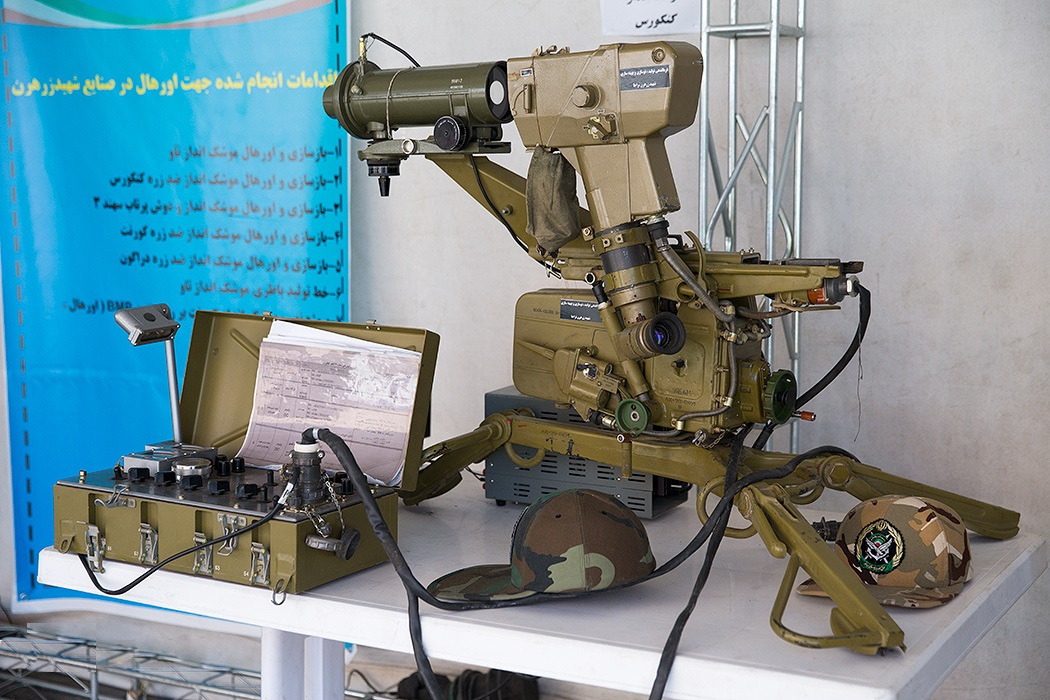
- The Tosan on display.
- Type: Anti-tank missile
- Place of origin: Iran

Service history
- In service: 2000-Present
- Used by: See Operators

Production history
- Designer: KBP Instrument Design Bureau
- Designed: 1991
- Manufacturer: Aerospace Industries Organization
- Produced: January 2000-Present

Specifications
- Mass: 5.25 kg
- Length: 130 cm
- Diameter: 135 mm

The Tosan, sometimes reported as the Tosan-1, is an Iranian SACLOS wire-guided anti-tank missile. It is a copy of the 9M113 Konkurs.

It's currently manufactured by Aerospace Industries Organization.

== History ==
The Tosan was licensed by Iran in 1991 from Russia. Its production reportedly started in January 2000 with the inauguration of its production line. The Tosan was first deployed in war games by the IRGC in Kerman in 2013.

== Design ==
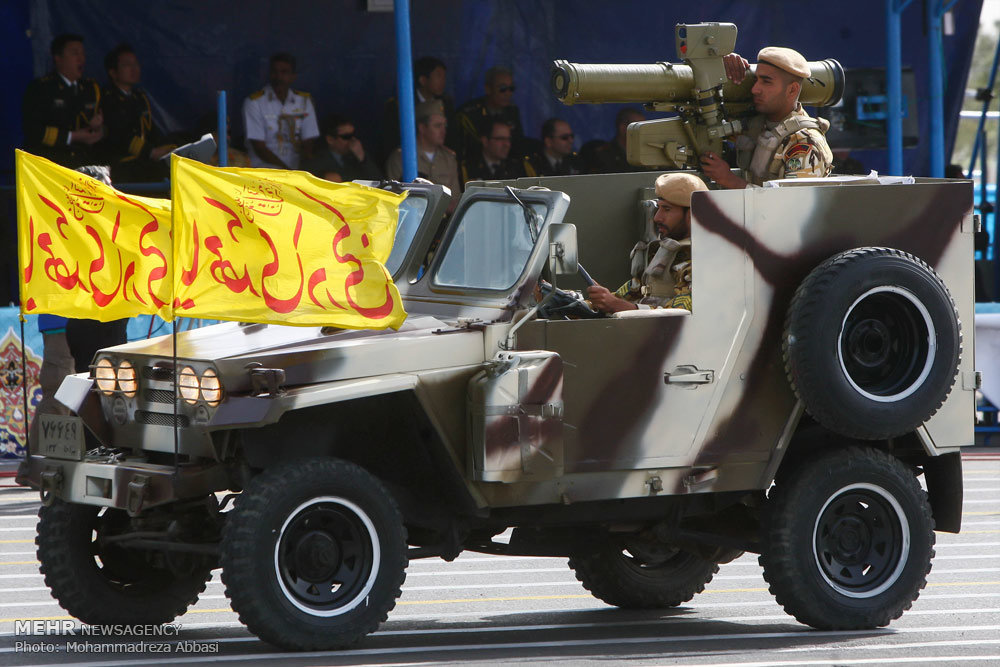
The Tosan mounted on a Fath Safir.

The Tosan is armed with two warheads at a distance of 75 meters after firing from a missile launcher and can destroy any target at long distances.

The missile weighs 26.5 kg, with 3.2 kg from the warhead. Its range is between 70 and 4000 meters; its maximum speed is 200 meters per second, its probability of hitting the target is 95% and its penetration rate in the armor depth is up to 670 mm.

The missile range decreases to 2,500 meters at night.

In 2018, it was reported that the Tosan can have the "RU244TK" and "RU150TK" thermal imaging cameras attached.

== Operators ==
- Iran

=== Non-State Actors ===
- Houthis
