= Defense industry of Iran =

Iran's military industry manufactures and exports various types of arms and military equipment. It is under the direction of the Ministry of Defense and Armed Forces Logistics.

== History ==
Iran's military industry was born under the last Shah of Iran, Mohammad Reza Pahlavi. In 1973, the Iran Electronics Industries (IEI) was founded to organize efforts to assemble and repair foreign-delivered weapons. Most of Iran's weapons before the Islamic revolution were imported from the United States and Europe. Between 1971 and 1975, the Shah bought large amounts of arms, ordering $8 billion of arms from the United States alone. This alarmed the United States Congress, which strengthened a 1968 law on arms exports in 1976 and renamed it the Arms Export Control Act. Still, the United States continued to sell large amounts of weapons to Iran until the 1979 Islamic Revolution.

In 1977, the Iranian Defense Industries Organization began to work on missiles jointly with Israel in Project Flower and requested a joint missile development program with the United States which was rejected. In 1979, the country took the first step into manufacturing by reverse engineering Soviet RPG-7, BM21, and SA-7 missiles.

After the Islamic revolution and the start of the Iran–Iraq War, economic sanctions and an international arms embargo led by the United States coupled with a high demand for military hardware forced Iran to rely on its domestic arms industry for repair and spare parts. The Islamic Revolutionary Guard Corps was put in charge of re-organising the domestic military industry. Under their command Iran's military industry was dramatically expanded, and with the Ministry of Defence pouring capital into the missile industry, Iran soon had an arsenal of missiles.

Since 1993, it also has produced its own tanks, armoured personnel carriers, missiles, a submarine and a fighter plane.

In 2007, following events in Iran's Nuclear Program, the United Nations Security Council placed sanctions on Iran forbidding it from exporting any form of weapons. Despite these sanctions, Iran sold some military equipment to countries such as Sudan, Syria and North Korea. Iran was also unable to import military equipment such as S-300 from Russia and went on to build its own substitute dubbed as Bavar 373.

On 2 November 2012, Iran's Brigadier General Hassan Seifi said that the Iranian Army had achieved self-suffiency in producing military equipment, and that the abilities of Iranian scientists have enabled the country to make significant progress in this field. He was quoted saying, "Unlike Western countries which hide their new weapons and munitions from all, the Islamic Republic of Iran's Army is not afraid of displaying its latest military achievements and all countries must become aware of Iran's progress in producing weaponry." As of 2016, the Defence Ministry is collaborating with more than 3150 national firms as well as 92 universities.

Iran's Defense Ministry claimed that it has begun manufacturing air defense laser cannons on 16 November 2019. On September 03, 2020, Iranian Defense Minister Brigadier General Amir Hatami said his country is capable of manufacturing more than 38,000 military equipment and hardware parts. In February 2023, Iran reported that had tripled its military products exports in 2022 while its self-sufficiency in military needs had reached 93%. Iranian Defense Minister Mohammad Reza Ashtiani claimed in March 2024 an increase of 4 to 5 times in defense exports without specifying details.

== Building of Unmanned Aerial Vehicles ==
Iran has produced several unmanned aerial vehicles (UAVs), which can be used for reconnaissance and combat operations. Iran has also claimed to have downed, captured and later reverse-engineered US and Israeli drones. Iranian drones have seen extensive combat during the Syrian civil war as well as by the Houthi movement during the Yemeni Civil War, mostly against Saudi targets. In July 2022, after Russia's invasion of Ukraine, the U.S. reported that Iran was supplying Russia with military drones. Iran later confirmed the reports, though it denied the drones were meant to be used in the Ukraine war, and added that China was on the list of countries looking to import Iranian drones.

On November 7, 2026, Hossein Mohebbi, a spokesperson for the Islamic Revolutionary Guard Corps (IRGC), claimed that the IRGC Aerospace Force had taken control of seven MQ-170 reconnaissance drones in the past two weeks and landed them safely. He also said that this demonstrates our technological superiority over the enemy.

== Components ==
Circa 2015 Iran's defence instrustry was composed of the following main components:

Organization	Field of activity
Iran Electronics Industries	Electronics, communications, e-warfare, radars, satellites, etc.
Defense Industries Organization	Tanks, rockets, bombs, guns, armored vehicles, etc.
Aerospace Industries Organization	Guided missiles systems, etc.
Aviation Industries Organization	Aircraft, UAV, helicopters, etc.
Marine Industries Organization	Ships, hovercraft, submarines, etc.

Security of Telecommunication and Information Technology (STI) is also part of the Iranian defense industry.

== See also ==
- Industry of Iran
- Iran Aviation Industries Organization
- Defense Industries Organization (DIO)
- Iran Electronics Industries (IEI)
