= List of equipment of the Iranian Army =

The page includes weapons used by both the Islamic Republic of Iran Ground Forces and the Islamic Revolutionary Guard Corps Ground Forces.

From 1925 to the Iranian Revolution in 1979, Iran was primarily equipped with Western hardware and equipment. Cases exist where Iran was supplied with equipment before it was even made standard in the country that developed it (for example the US F-14 Tomcat jet, and the British Chieftain tank). Primary suppliers included the United States, Britain, France, West Germany, Italy, Israel, and the Soviet Union.

The post-revolution sanctions and the Iran–Iraq War had a dramatic effect on Iran's inventory of Western equipment. Under the pressures of war, supplies were quickly exhausted and replacements became difficult to come by. The war forced Iran to turn towards Syria, Brazil and China to meet its short-term military needs. Initial developments in military technology were carried out with the support of China, North Korea and Russia to lay the foundations for future industries.

Iranian reliance on these countries has rapidly decreased since the 2010s in most sectors whereby Iran has gained almost total independence. However, in some sectors such as aerospace, Iran is still greatly reliant on external sourcing. Iran has developed the capacity to reverse engineer existing foreign hardware, adapt it to its own requirements and then manufacture the finished product. Examples of this are the Boragh IFV. In an attempt to make its military industries more sustainable Iran has also sought to export its military products.

== Infantry Equipment ==
Model	Type	Image	Origin	Notes
Attire & Uniform
DPM	Camouflage pattern, Combat uniform		Iran	The Army’s current standard-issue camouflage pattern, which is gradually being phased out in favor of a new digital desert pattern similar to Desert MARPAT.
Woodland	Camouflage pattern, Combat uniform		Iran	Standard issue camouflage pattern of the Army.
Chocolate Chip	Camouflage pattern, Combat uniform		Iran	Used on NBC protective suits issued to all branches of the Army.
MARPAT-style	Camouflage pattern, Combat uniform		Iran	Both Woodland and Desert variants are currently in service with the Islamic Revolutionary Guard Corps (IRGC).
MultiCam	Camouflage pattern, Combat uniform		Iran; United States China Russia	In service with the IRGC special operation forces.
Infantry gears
Ruyin-1	Body armor		Iran	Standard body armor of the Islamic Republic of Iran Army professional units. Offers level NIJ IIIA protection with soft armor installed.
Ruyin-2	Body armor		Iran	Second most widely used body armor of the Islamic Revolutionary Guard Corps, alongside the very similarly designed Ruyin-3. Offers high level NIJ IV level protection with plates installed. Also used by FARAJA and NEDAJA.
Ruyin-3	Body armor		Iran	Standard body armor of the Islamic Revolutionary Guard Corps and Basij units, offers high level NIJ IV level protection with plates installed. Also used by FARAJA.
Ruyin-5	Body armor		Iran	Standard light plate carrier of Islamic Revolutionary Guard Corps. Also used by FARAJA.
PASGT	Kevlar ballistic helmet		Iran; United States	Locally-made copy. Standard issue helmet for all Iranian ground forces.
Advanced Combat Helmet	Kevlar ballistic helmet		Iran; United States	Locally-made copy. Standard helmet across military, except for SOF and Islamic Republic of Iran Army conscripts.
FAST	Kevlar ballistic helmet		Iran; United States	Locally-made copy. Standard helmet for Special Operations units across the Iranian Armed Forces.
M1 helmet	Steel helmet		United States; West Germany	Used by Islamic Republic of Iran Army conscripts.
MOLLE type vest	Load bearing vest		Iran	Used across all units.
Ephod combat vest	Load bearing vest		Iran; Israel	Locally-made copy. Used across all units.
C-50 Gas Mask	Gas mask		Iran; United States	Locally-made copy. New standard issue gas mask.
M74 Gas Mask	Gas mask		Iran	Locally-made copy. Former standard issue gas mask for all units, now currently being phased out.

== Infantry weapons ==
=== Firearms ===
Model	Cartridge Type	Image	Origin	Notes
Pistols
PC-9 Zoaf	9×19mm Semi-automatic pistol		Iran; Switzerland	Iranian version of the SIG Sauer P226 platform. In service with the Police and Army.
CZ 75	9×19mm Semi-automatic pistol		Czechoslovakia	Used by 65th Airborne Special Forces Brigade.
Glock 19/Glock 17	9×19mm Semi-automatic pistol		Austria	In service with the IRGC. A locally-made copy is also in development.
FN Hi-Power	9×19mm Semi-automatic pistol		Belgium	In service with the IRGC.
Colt M1911A1	.45 ACP Semi-automatic pistol		United States	In service with the Army.
Submachine guns
Tondar (MPT9, MPT9S), Tondar Light (MPT9K)	9×19mm Submachine gun	Morning_ceremony_of_selected_Iranian_military_units,_2019_(93)	Iran; West Germany	Heckler & Koch MP5 variants produced under license under the trade names of Tondar, and MPT9.
Beretta M12	9×19mm Submachine gun		Italy	
Star Model Z84	9×19mm Submachine gun		Spain	Amphibious submachine gun is used by IRGCN frogmen.
Uzi	9×19mm Submachine gun		Israel	Iran originally obtained its Israeli-made Uzi submachine guns directly from Israel during the reign of Shah Mohammad Reza Pahlavi.
PP-19 Vityaz	9×19mm Submachine gun		Russia Iran	
K7 SMG	9×19mm Submachine gun		Republic of Korea Iran	
Shotguns
Hatsan Escort MPA-TS	12-gauge Shotgun		Turkey	Used by IRGC during the Mahsa Amini protests.
Battle rifles
Heckler & Koch G3A6	7.62×51mm Battle rifle		West Germany; Iran	Artesh service rifle. Heckler & Koch G3A3 and G3A4 rifles produced under license. Iranian G3A6 differs from original G3A3 in having a dark-green slimline handguard, fixed stock, and trigger pack. There is also a retractable stock variant (G3A4). To be replaced by the Masaf-2 as standard issue service rifle for all units except the IRGC.
Masaf 2	7.62×51mm Battle rifle	Thirteenth_Young_Soldier_Festival_(101)	Iran	Battle rifle version of the first Masaf variant. It was unveiled in 2021 and has been issued to Army Ground Forces 35th Rapid Reactionary Brigade by 2025. It is meant to replace Heckler & Koch G3A6 as the Artesh new service rifle.
Zulfiqar Z1	7.62×51mm Battle rifle		Iran	Unveiled in 2017. Yet to enter service.
Azarakhsh	7.62×51mm Battle rifle		Iran	Iranian-designed bullpup variant of the G3 platform. Was not adopted by the armed forces.
Assault rifles
KLS KLF KLT	7.62×39mm Assault rifle		Iran	Standard issue assault rifle of the Army and IRGC. Iranian versions of the AK platform modeled after the Type 56, MPi-KMS 72 and the AKM.
AK-133	7.62×39mm Assault rifle	Ninth_Young_Soldier_Festival_and_unveiling_of_weapons_(020)	Iran; Russia	IRGC service rifle. AK-103 rifle produced under license under the name AK-133, first unveiled in March 2018. An undisclosed amount of AK-103 rifles for use by special forces were purchased from Kalashnikov Concern and delivered in 2016. Iran issues another copy of the AK-103 which is called KL-133, an Iranian-Chinese model that is not made under license of the Kalashnikov company.
Sayyad 5.56	5.56×45mm Assault rifle		Iran; China	Iranian version of the M16 platform modeled after the Norinco CQ. In service with IRGC SOF units.
Fajr 224	5.56×45mm Assault rifle		Iran	Iranian version of the M4 carbine platform.
Masaf 1	5.56×45mm Assault rifle	Morning_ceremony_of_selected_Iranian_military_units,_2019_(32)	Iran	Either a domestically developed short-stroke piston-driven variant of the AR-15 platform or a copy of the HK416, first unveiled in October 2016.
M4 carbine	5.56×45mm Assault rifle		United States	Troops of the Iranian Army's 65th Airborne Special Forces Brigade in 2025 are seen equipped with significant numbers of US-made M4A1 which Iran received in fairly large quantities during the fleeing of part of the Afghan military in Iran in 2021 when the Taliban took power.
M16A4	5.56×45mm Assault rifle		United States	Troops of the Iranian Army's 65th Airborne Special Forces Brigade in 2025 are seen equipped with significant numbers of US-made M16A4 which Iran received in fairly large quantities during the fleeing of part of the Afghan military in Iran in 2021 when the Taliban took power.
Fateh	5.56×45mm Assault rifle		Iran	
Mpi Kms 72	7.62×39 Assault rifle		East Germany	Built under license Ak-47 by East Germany, The main weapon of Iran's commandos such as NOHED.
Heckler & Koch HK53	5.56×45mm Assault rifle		West Germany	
KH-2002 Khaybar	5.56×45mm Assault rifle		Iran	Iranian-designed bullpup variant of the M16/M4 platform. It was not adopted by the armed forces.
Type 56	7.62×39mm Assault rifle		China	Large quantity acquired in the 1980s during the Iran–Iraq War.
AKM variants	7.62×39mm Assault rifle		Warsaw Pact states	Unknown quantity.
Sniper and anti-materiel rifles
Nakhjir (Hoshdar)	7.62×54mmR Sniper rifle, Designated marksman rifle		Iran; Soviet Union	Iranian version of the SVD platform. An upgraded variant was unveiled on 12 December 2016.
Siyavash	7.62×51mm Sniper rifle		Iran	Domestically produced lightweight sniper rifle weighing 6.5 kg (14 lb) loaded.
Taher	7.62×51mm Sniper rifle		Iran	Domestically developed sniper rifle with maximum range of 1200 m.
Hovaza	12.7×99mm Sniper rifle Anti-materiel rifle		Iran	Iranian copy of Barrett M82/M107.
Steyr HS .50 Sayyad AM-50	12.7×99mm (.50 BMG) Sniper rifle, Anti-materiel rifle		Iran; Austria	
Shaher	14.5×114mm Sniper rifle, Anti-materiel rifle		Iran	
Taktab	20×102mm Anti-materiel rifle		Iran	Iranian 20 mm anti material sniper rifle.
Arash	20×102mm Anti-materiel rifle		Iran	
Machine guns
M249	5.56×45mm Light machine gun		United States	Troops of the Iranian Army's 65th Airborne Special Forces Brigade in 2025 are seen equipped with significant numbers of US-made M249 which Iran received in fairly large quantities during the fleeing of part of the Afghan military in Iran in 2021 when the Taliban took power.
RPK	7.62×39mm Light machine gun		Iran; Soviet Union	Iranian version of the RPK platform.
Rheinmetall MGA3	7.62×51mm General-purpose machine gun		West Germany; Iran	Rheinmetall MG3 produced under license.
PKM, PKT	7.62×54mmR General-purpose machine gun		Iran; Soviet Union	Iranian versions of the PKM and PKMT platforms.
Akhgar	7.62×51mm Rotary cannon, Heavy machine gun		Iran	Locally produced 7.62 mm 6-barrelled rotary machine gun.
W85	12.7×108mm Heavy machine gun		Iran; China	Iranian version of the W85 platform.
MGD 12.7	12.7×108mm Heavy machine gun		Iran; Soviet Union	Iranian version of the DShkM.
CS/LM2A	14.5×114mm Heavy machine gun		Iran; China	Iranian version of the CS/LM2 platform, first unveiled in 2019. The earliest record of its import dating to 2017.
Moharram	12.7×108mm Rotary cannon, Heavy machine gun		Iran	Locally produced 12.7 mm 6-barrelled rotary machine gun.

=== Explosives ===
Model	Type	Origin	Image	Notes
Grenade-based weapons
Nasir	Automatic grenade launcher	Iran		40mm automatic grenade launcher.
Kaveh-30	Automatic grenade launcher	Iran; Soviet Union		30mm automatic grenade launcher.
GP-25	Grenade launcher	Soviet Union		40mm under-barrel grenade launcher. Used by Islamic Revolutionary Guard Corps.
M79	Grenade launcher	United States		40mm shoulder-fired grenade launcher.
Unguided anti-tank weapons
Fath	Rocket-propelled grenade	Iran		
Nafez	Rocket-propelled grenade	Iran		
Zafar	Rocket-propelled grenade	Iran		
Saegheh	Rocket-propelled grenade	Iran		Improved version of the RPG-7.
RPG-7	Rocket-propelled grenade launcher	Soviet Union		
RPG-29 Ghadir	Rocket-propelled grenade launcher	Soviet Union		
Type 69 RPG	Rocket-propelled grenade launcher	China		Chinese copy of Russian RPG-7.
SPG-9	Recoilless rifle	Soviet Union		
M40	Recoilless rifle	United States		

Model	Type	Years of production	Origin	Image	Notes
Guided anti-tank weapons
Saeghe 1/2	Anti-tank guided missile		Iran		Iran copy of M47 Dragon.
Toophan Toophan 2 Toophan 2B Toophan 2M Toophan 3 Toophan 4 Toophan 5 Toophan 6 Toophan 7	Anti-tank guided missile	Entered production 1987/1988. Revealed 2000. N/A N/A Introduced 2016 First shown to the public in 2017 but in use since at least 2015. Began development in 2002 and entered production in 2010. Shown to the Public in 2017 Planned Variant, currently in development.	Iran		Considered to be the BGM-71A TOW clone, the Toophan-1's payload is a 3.6 kg HEAT warhead. The top speed is 310 m/s. Toophan-1 marketing material claims a hit probability of 96%. The Toophan 2 is a derivative of BGM-71C TOW missile with a tandem HEAT warhead; possibly incorporating elements of BGM-71E TOW 2A missile. The Toophan 2B is an upgraded model of the Toophan 2 with a heavier warhead. The Toophan 2M is an upgraded model of the Toophan 2B equipped with a tandem-warhead. The Toophan 3 is a reverse-engineered American BGM-71F TOW 2B top-attack missile. The Toophan 4 is a variant of the Toophan family which is equipped with a thermobaric fuel-air warhead. Considered the premier Toophan variant, the Toophan-5 has laser guidance, tandem-warhead and canards. As a laser-riding missile, it uses a different launcher. Not a copy of any TOW variant. The Toophan 6 is a variant of the Toophan family which is equipped with an anti-bunker thermobaric warhead and is said to be laser-riding. The Toophan 7 is a planned variant of the Toophan family, it's equipped warhead is unclear some sources claim it is perhaps fragmentation thermobaric.
Qaem Qaem-M	Anti-aircraft missile	Entered mass production in 2009	Iran		The Qaem is an Iranian SACLOS beam-riding SHORAD surface-to-air missile. With a range of six kilometers and a maximum altitude of two kilometers, the Qaem is intended for use against unmanned aerial vehicles and low flying or stationary helicopters. The Qaem is a development of the Toophan missile, hence why they are identical in appearance. The missiles can be used by Ghods Mohajer unmanned aerial vehicles. The Qaem anti-aircraft missile uses a laser guidance system. Iran also produces a variant, the Qaem-M, which adds a proximity fuse.
Dehlavie	Anti-tank guided missile		Iran		Iranian copy of Kornet. Available as Pirooz vehicle-mounted weapon station.
Almas	Anti-tank guided missile		Iran		Ground-launched version the air-launched Almas, top attack weapon with a range of 8 km. Unlicensed clone of Israeli Spike.
Raad	Anti-tank guided missile		Iran		Manufactured in Iran under the name Raad.
9K111 Fagot	Anti-tank guided missile		Soviet Union		
9M113 Konkurs	Anti-tank guided missile		Soviet Union		
Tosan-1	Anti-tank guided missile		Iran		Manufacturing license of 9M113 Konkurs.
9K115-2 Metis-M	Anti-tank guided missile		Russia		

== Vehicles ==
=== Combat vehicles ===
Model	Type	In service	Origin	Image	Notes
Main battle tanks (total quantity 1513+)
Karrar	Main battle tank	N/A	Iran		Production begun, 800 planned by end of 2021.
T-72S	Main battle tank	480	Iran; Soviet Union		Iran produced and received T-72S tanks under licence from Russia from 1993 to 2012, received 104 T-72M1 tanks from Poland from 1994 to 1995 and 37 T-72M1 tanks from Belarus starting in 2000. Possible unlicensed production. 1,500 T-72S were ordered/built. Unknown amount of T-72M upgraded to Rakhsh standard, and hundreds of less capable T-72M/M1. T-72 Khorramshahr fitted with T-80UD welded turret and using Kontakt-5 ERA, didn't enter service.
Zulfiqar MBT 1 Zulfiqar MBT 3	Main battle tank	N/A N/A	Iran		Based on M60. Featuring EFCS-3 fire control system and carousel autoloader. The Zulfiqar 3 is the latest model in the family which has been heavily modernized with advanced technologies and armaments. It features considerable upgrades to the fire control system, chassis, engine and main gun. The new variant is equipped with the 2A46 125 mm smoothbore cannon, a laser rangefinder, RAM camouflage and a new fire control system. It is also fitted with a reinforced turret and the wheels are covered by an armoured skirt.
T-72Z Safir-74	Main battle tank	540	Iran Soviet Union		The T-72Z Safir-74 is a modernized model of the T-55 tank.
Mobarez	Main battle tank	100	United Kingdom; Iran		707 Mk-3P and Mk-5P, 125–189 FV-4030-1, 41 ARV and 14 AVLB obtained before the 1979 revolution. Further planned deliveries of the more capable 4030 series were cancelled at that point. 100 in service as of 2005. Many others upgraded to Mobarez.
T-62	Main battle tank	75+	Soviet Union		
M60A1 Samsam	Main battle tank	150	United States; Iran		Some sources claim ~150 M60. Locally modernized as the Samsam. A new modernization package called the Soleiman-402 was unveiled in 2024, Brigadier General Kioumars Heydari, Commander of the Army Ground Forces, confirmed that all M60 tanks within the Iranian Army's inventory would be upgraded to the Soleiman-402 standard.
M47 M48	Medium tank	168	United States		
Armoured vehicles
Tosan	Light tank	N/A	Iran		Tosan is a domestically produced light tank, based on the FV101 Scorpion.
FV101 Scorpion	Combat vehicle reconnaissance	80	United Kingdom		
Sayyad	Armored fast attack vehicle	N/A	Iran		Can be armed with 77 mm rockets, anti-tank guided missiles, and various chainguns.
Boragh	Armoured personnel carrier	140	Iran		Can be armed with DSHK Heavy Machine guns or ZU-23-2.
Makran IFV	Amphibious	N/A	Iran		Most BTR-50s will be upgraded or are being upgraded to Makran IFV (BTR-50 with new electronics, new armor, and an unmanned turret with a 30mm auto-cannon).
BMP-1	Infantry fighting vehicle	210	Soviet Union		
BMP-2	Infantry fighting vehicle	400	Soviet Union; Iran		1,500 ordered in 1991 from Russia and 413 were delivered between 1993 and 2001 of which 82 were delivered directly by Russia and 331 were assembled in Iran. 100 were in service in 1995, 140 in 2000 and 400 in 2002, 2005 and 2008. 400 are currently in service. Some sources claim that production is ongoing.
M113½ C&R Lynx	Reconnaissance armoured fighting vehicle	N/A	United States		
M113A1/M577	Armoured personnel carrier	200	United States		
Rakhsh	Armoured personnel carrier	Unknown	Iran		Multiple variants, some with upgraded armor.
BTR-50 BTR-60 Haidar	Armoured personnel carrier	300	Iran		KPVT 14.5 mm machine gun replaced with DShKM 12.7 mm machine gun or ZSU-23 gun on some vehicles. anti-tank guided missile launchers added to some vehicles. Sedad BTR-82 variant of BTR-60 with ZU-23-2. Heidar 6 variant with BMP-1 turret installed onto BTR-60, Heidar 7 variant with ERA bricks, modified interior, and new turret installed with a single 23 mm gun. Heidar-5 mine layer variant and Shahram NRBC detection vehicle variants of BTR-60.
Pirooz	Anti-tank missile carrier	N/A	Iran		Based on Aras tactical vehicle. The vehicle is equipped either two or four Dehlavieh anti-tank missile system.
EE-9 Cascavel	Armored car	35	Brazil		According to Global Security, 35 are in service.
EE-11 Urutu	Armoured personnel carrier	N/A	Brazil		
Toofan	MRAP	N/A	Iran		
Ra'ad	MRAP	N/A	Iran		
AMN-590951 Spartak (VPK-Ural)	MRAP	N/A	Russia		Iran has formally introduced Russian-made Spartak mine-resistant armored vehicles into its border forces, marking the first documented transfer of this model to Tehran on November 23, 2025.
Kia	Infantry mobility vehicle	N/A	Iran		
Fateq	Infantry mobility vehicle	N/A	Iran		
Special military equipment
Murmansk-BN	Electronic warfare system	N/A	Russia		With a range of up to 5000 km, capable of jamming and intercepting radio signals, GPS, communications, satellites, and other electronic systems.
Krasukha	Electronic warfare system	N/A	Russia		With a range of 150–300 km, focusses on X/Ku/Ka-band radar and satellite communications. Employs "a broadband multifunctional electronic attack system" which interferes with radar and satellite signals as well as intelligence, surveillance and reconnaissance (ISR) sensors, such as those used by AWACS airborne radar systems, and surveillance platforms installed on the E-8 aircraft.

=== Non-combat vehicles ===
Model	Type	Quantity	Acquired	Origin	Image	Notes
Utility vehicles
Safir Jeep	Multipurpose military vehicle	36,000+	2008	Iran		Yearly production capacity of 5000 vehicles.
Samandar	Light attack vehicle	1000+		Iran		
Kaviran / Sepehr	Multipurpose utility vehicle	900 to 1800+		Iran		Also used as military ambulances.
Aras/Aras 2	Multipurpose military vehicle	2000+		Iran		Iranian-made tactical vehicle based on F-4.5 Toyota chassis.
Aras 3	Multipurpose military vehicle	1000+		Iran		
Ranger	Light attack vehicle	Unknown		Iran		
M548	Cargo carrier	Unknown		United States		Some ex-Afghan National Army units that were evacuated to Iran in 2021.
High Mobility Multipurpose Wheeled Vehicle	Light utility vehicle	Unknown	2021	United States		Some examples were taken from fleeing ANA troops after 2021 Taliban offensive and put to service with Artesh Ground Force's 55th Airborne Brigade after face-lift.
Trucks
Neynava	Lightweight truck	15,000+		Iran		
Mercedes-Benz L-series truck	Truck	Unknown		West Germany; Iran		
Navistar 7000 series	Heavy truck	Unknown		United States		Some ex-Afghan National Army trucks that were evacuated to Iran in 2021.
Mercedes-Benz Actros	Heavy truck	1000+		Germany		
MAN KAT1	Heavy truck	Unknown		Germany		Also used as a mount for the 122mm HM-20 multiple rocket system.
KrAZ-6322	Heavy truck	Unknown		Ukraine		
KrAZ-5233	Heavy truck	Unknown		Ukraine		
KamAZ-43114	Heavy truck	2500+		Iran; Russia		Licensed production under Rakhsh Khodro Diesel.
IVECO Eurocargo	Heavy truck	Unknown		Iran; Italy		Licensed production under Zamyad.
Hyundai Mighty	Light truck	2000+		Republic of Korea		
Engineering vehicles
Shahram NRBC	CBRN defense	Unknown		Iran		
Husky VMMD	Mine-resistant ambush protected vehicle	Unknown		South Africa; Egypt		Dozens of units are in service, a specific number is unknown.

== Artillery ==
Model	Type	Quantity	Acquired	Origin	Picture	Notes
Mortars (total quantity 3000)
37mm Marsh Mortar	37mm mortar	N/A		Iran		
HM 12	60 mm mortar	N/A		Iran		
HM 13	60 mm mortar	N/A		Iran		
HM 14	60 mm mortar	N/A		Iran		
HM 15	81 mm mortar	Unknown		Iran		
HM 16	120 mm mortar	Unknown		Iran		
Razm Mortar	120 mm mortar	N/A		Iran		
Vafa Mortar	160 mm mortar	N/A		Iran		
Multiple launch rocket systems (total quantity 1476+)
Fajr 1	107mm MRL	600	1986	Iran; China		Mounted on the Safir.
Type 63	107mm MRL	700		China		
BM-11	122mm multiple launch rocket system	7		Soviet Union		
BM-21 Grad	122mm multiple launch rocket system	100	1978	Soviet Union		
Arash/Hadid/Noor	122mm multiple launch rocket system	50	1994	Iran		
Fajr-3	240mm multiple launch rocket system	~10	1994	Iran		
M-1985	240mm multiple launch rocket system	9		Iran North Korea		
Fajr-5	333mm multiple launch rocket system	Unknown		Iran		
Self-propelled howitzers (total quantity 292)
2S1 Gvozdika	122mm self-propelled howitzer	60		Soviet Union		
Raad 2	155 mm self-propelled howitzer	N/A	1997	Iran		Based on M109.
M109A1	155 mm self-propelled howitzer	150		United States; Iran		Remanufactured locally as the Hoveyzeh.
M-1978	170 mm self-propelled howitzer	30		North Korea		
M107	175 mm self-propelled howitzer	22		United States		
M110	203 mm self-propelled howitzer	30		United States		
Towed howitzers (total quantity 2030+)
M101A1	105mm howitzer	130		United States		
M-56	105 mm howitzer	20		Yugoslavia		
2A18M (D-30)	122 mm howitzer	540		Soviet Union		
M-30	122 mm howitzer	100		Soviet Union		
D-74/Type 60 field gun	122 mm howitzer	N/A		Soviet Union; China		Operated by IRGC-Ground artillery.
122mm HM 40	122 mm howitzer	N/A		Iran		Photo may show scale model.
M1954 and Type 59	130 mm howitzer	985		Soviet Union and China		In 2002, Iran had 1,100 M-46 in conditional use. By 2012 this number has dropped to 985.
M1955 (D-20)	152 mm howitzer	30		Soviet Union		
KH179	155 mm howitzer	N/A		South Korea		
155mm HM 41	155 mm howitzer	N/A		Iran		
GHN-45	155 mm howitzer	120		Canada		
M114	155 mm howitzer	70		United States		
WAC-21	155 mm howitzer	15		China		
M115	203 mm howitzer	20		United States		

== Missiles ==
This refers to ballistic missiles and not battlefield systems. Iran's missile forces are under the command of the Revolutionary Guards, under the army's authority. Additional information is available at the article Air Force of the Army of the Guardians of the Islamic Revolution, which force operates Iran's long-range missiles. Iran was reported to have purchased 18 mobile Musudan missiles (the extended range version of Soviet R-27 Zyb) with a 3,200-to-4,000 km range in 2005.

Model	Type	Quantity	Acquired	Origin	Image	Notes
Anti-ship missiles
Khalij Fars	Anti-ship ballistic missile	N/A		Iran		Based on Fateh-110.
Kowsar 1/2/3	Anti-ship missile	N/A		China; Iran		A copy of Chinese C-701 and TL-10.
HY-2 Silkworm	Anti ship missile	N/A		China		Chinese ASCM.
Nasr-1	Anti ship missile	N/A		China; Iran		A copy of Chinese C-705 and TL-6.
Noor	Anti-ship missile	N/A		China; Iran		A copy of Chinese C-801 and C-802.
Qader	Anti ship missile	N/A		China; Iran		An enhanced, locally produced version of the C-802 anti-ship missile.
Ghadir	Anti-ship missile	N/A		Iran		
Ra'ad	Anti-ship missile	N/A		Iran		The missile is a reverse engineered and upgraded variant of China's Silkworm anti-ship missile.
Zafar	Anti-ship missile	N/A		Iran		Light ASCM for IRGC navy.
Abu Mahdi	Anti ship missile	N/A		Iran		Long-range ASCM.
Ballistic missiles
Tondar-69	Rocket artillery	N/A		China; Iran		
Oghab	Rocket artillery	N/A	1985–present	China; Iran		An upgraded Chinese Type-83 rocket, created with Chinese assistance.
Naze'at	Rocket artillery	N/A		Iran		
Zelzal	Tactical ballistic missile	3800+		Iran		With a range of 300 km.
Fateh-110	Tactical ballistic missile	4500+	2002–present	Iran		With A\B\C\D variants, ranging between 250 and 300 km. Belongs to the Fath missile family.
Kheibar Shekhan	Medium range Ballistic Missile		2022	Iran		With a range of ~1450 km and a solid fuel motor. Belongs to the Fath missile family. Supplied to the Houthis as "Hatem".
Fath 360	Tactical ballistic missile (close range)	100+	2022–present	Iran		Belongs to the Fath missile family.
Fateh 313	Short range Ballistic missile		2015	Iran		With a range of ~500 km and a solid fuel motor. From the Fath missile family.
Fateh Mobin	Short range Ballistic missile		2018	Iran		With a range of ~700 km and a solid fuel motor. Belongs to the Fath missile family.
Dezful	Short-Medium range ballistic missile		2019	Iran		With a range of ~1000 km and a solid fuel motor. Belongs to the Fath missile family.
Raad 500 (Zouhair)	Short range Ballistic missile		2022	Iran		With a range of ~500 km and a solid fuel motor. Belongs to the Fath missile family.
9K720 Iskander	Mobile short-range ballistic missile	N/A		Russia		
Zolfaghar	Short range Ballistic missile		2016	Iran		With a range of ~700 km and a solid fuel motor. Belongs to the Fath missile family.
Haj Qassem	Medium range ballistic missile		2020	Iran		With a range of ~1400 km and a solid fuel motor. Belongs to the Fath missile family.
Qassem Bassir	Medium-range ballistic missile	N/A	2025	Iran		With a range of ~1200 km and a solid fuel motor. An improved variant of the Haj Qasem.
Sejjil/Sejjil 2	Medium-range ballistic missile			Iran		With a range of ~2000 km when carrying a 750 kg warhead and a solid fuel motor. Preparation time for launch reported as minutes as opposed to the hours it takes to prepare liquid fuel propelled missiles. It is considered the most probable weapon to deliver an Iranian nuclear payload. Exceeds the Missile Technology Control Regime (MTCR) threshold.
Shahab 1	Short range ballistic missile		1985	Iran Soviet Union North Korea		A close copy of the Russian R-17 Elbrus (Scud-B) and the North Korean Hwasong 5 missiles. With a range of ~300 km and a liquid fuel motor.
Shahab 2	Short range ballistic missile		1997	Iran North Korea		Iranian variant of the Russian Scud-C built with assistance of North Korea. With a launch weight of 6095 kg, a range of ~500 km, a maximum payload of 770 kg and a liquid fuel motor.
Shahab 3	Medium range ballistic missile		~2003	Iran North Korea		An Iranian version of the North Korean No-Dong missile. With a range of ~1150–2000 km and a liquid fuel motor.
Qiam 1	Short range ballistic missile		2010	Iran		An improved variant of the Shahab 2, with a heavier launch weight (6155 kg), smaller payload (750 kg) and longer range (800 km). According to Behnam Ben Taleblu, with a range of ~700 km and a liquid fuel motor. Supplied to the Houthis as "Burkan-2H".
Qiam 2	Short range ballistic missile			Iran		With a range of ~1000 km and a liquid fuel motor. Supplied to the Houthis as "Falaq".
Ghadr 1 (101)	Medium range ballistic missile		2007	Iran		An improved variant of the Shahab 3A, with a "baby bottle" nosecone, reducing the payload volume by 20%, carrying a warhead of 750 kg. The denser warhead contributes to the speed increase of the reentry vehicle, hampering interception. Possesses a liquid fuel motor. Ranges vary according to model, between 1350 and 1950 km. Model S has a range of 1350 km, model H 1750 km, and model F 1950 km.
Emad	Medium range ballistic missile		2015	Iran		Not an entirely new missile but a different reentry vehicle placed on the Shahab 3 or Ghadr rocket. With a range of ~1700–2000 km and a liquid fuel motor.
Rezvan	Medium range ballistic missile					With a range of ~1400 km and a liquid fuel motor.
Khorramshahr, Khorramshahr-2	Medium range ballistic missile		2019	Iran North Korea		Based on the North Korean Musudan (BM-25) With a range of ~2000 km (Khorramshar-2 potentially 3000 km) and a liquid fuel motor.

== Aircraft ==
The IRIA Ground Forces operates an army aviation component comprising the following aircraft and UAVs:

=== Helicopters ===
Aircraft	Origin	Type	Variant	Quantity	Years	Image	Notes
Mil Mi-28	Russia	Attack	Mil Mi-28NE	1	2026		The deal to acquire an unspecified number of Mil Mi-28 helicopters by Iran was first announced in November 2023. A defense reporter for Iranian state-controlled Tasnim news agency reported arrival of Mil Mi-28NE attack helicopters in January 2026.
HESA Shahed 285	Iran	Light attack/Reconnaissance		2	2009		Can carry ATGMs, anti ship missiles, and air to air missiles.
IAIO Toufan	Iran	Attack	Toufan I/Toufan II	7	2010		The IAIO Toufan or Toophan (Persian: توفان, "typhoon") is series of combat helicopters by the Iran Aviation Industries Organization. Based on the AH-1J International with New laser system Rocket-launching digital control system Multi-display monitor, and Central smart arms management system.
Panha 2091	Iran	Attack		3	1998		One crached in 24 February 2026
HESA Shahed 274	Iran	Light utility helicopter		3	2000		
HESA Shahed 278	Iran	Light utility		7	2005		Iran's Shahed Aviation Industries Research Center plans to produce several variants of Shahed, according to sources. The first platform was the Shahed-278 (Oh-78), described as a light reconnaissance helicopter, armed with weapons and sensors. Test flights of the Shahed-278 (Oh-78) began in 2005.
Agusta Bell 206	Italy	Light utility/Trainer	AB 206	3			Licence-built in Italy.
Bell 214	United States	Utility/Search and rescue	Bell 214C/214A "Isfahan"	25			
Boeing CH-47 Chinook	United States	Heavy-lift transport	CH-47C	38			

=== Transport aircraft ===
Aircraft	Type	Versions	In service	Origin	Photo
Fokker F27 Friendship	Tactical transport	F27-400M F27-600	1	Netherlands	
Aero Commander	Utility transport	690	3	United States	

=== Unmanned aerial vehicles ===
Model	Type	Quantity	Acquired	Origin	Image	Notes
Sofreh Mahi	Stealth unmanned combat aerial vehicle	-		Iran		Under development.
Karrar	Unmanned combat aerial vehicle	+	2010	Iran		
Ababil	Unmanned aerial vehicle	+	1986	Iran		A wide number built in several different variants including the tactical Ababil-5 for medium-range reconnaissance and surveillance, the Ababil-T for short/medium-range attack, and also the Ababil-B and -S.
Arash	Loitering munition	Thousands	2020	Iran		
Mohajer 1/2/3/4/5	Unmanned aerial vehicle	300+	1980s	Iran		
Mohajer 6	Unmanned combat aerial vehicle	221+	2017	Iran		
Raad 85	Unmanned aerial vehicle	+		Iran		Suicide drone.
Ra'ad	Unmanned aerial vehicle	+		Iran		With offensive capabilities.
Nazir	Unmanned aerial vehicle	+		Iran		
Hod Hod	Unmanned aerial vehicle	+		Iran		
Saegheh 1	Target drone	90	2013	Iran		
Saegheh 2	Unmanned combat aerial vehicle	50+	2014	Iran		Based on, but smaller than and substantially different from, the Lockheed Martin RQ-170 Sentinel.
Simorgh	Unmanned combat aerial vehicle	?	2014	Iran		Full-size copy of the American RQ-170 unmanned aerial vehicle.
Yasir	Unmanned aerial vehicle	Hundreds	2013	Iran		In November 2013 a Yasir unmanned aerial vehicle was shown flying over Damascus, Syria in support of Syrian Arab Army forces fighting against rebels.
Shahed 129	Unmanned combat aerial vehicle	42+	2012	Iran		Medium-altitude long-endurance combat drone, counterpart of the American MQ-1 Predator.
Mohajer 10	Unmanned combat aerial vehicle	1+	2023	Iran		The Mohajer 10 is fitted with surveillance and electronic warfare capabilities, it is capable of flying at speeds of up to 130 mph, and can carry several kinds of armament with a maximum payload of over 650 pounds.
Shahed 136	Loitering munition	Thousands	2020/2021	Iran		
Shahed 149 Gaza	Unmanned combat aerial vehicle	3+	2021	Iran		High-altitude long-endurance combat drone, counterpart of the American MQ-9 Reaper.
Hamaseh	Unmanned aerial vehicle	30	2013	Iran		A medium-range drone, capable of carrying air to ground missiles.
H-110 Sarir	Unmanned combat aerial vehicle	10+	2013	Iran		Capable of carrying air-to-air missiles.
Fotros	Unmanned combat aerial vehicle	3+	2013	Iran		Unmanned combat aerial vehicle with range of 2000 km, flight ceiling of 25000 ft and 16–30 hours flight endurance, armed with missiles.
Kaman 22	Unmanned combat aerial vehicle	?	2021	Iran		Wide-body combat drone with a range of 3000 km, a flight duration of over 24 hours and armed with variety of weapons.
Meraj-532	Unmanned aerial vehicle	?	2023	Iran		IRGC Meraj-532: A suicide drone to be used in Islamic Revolutionary Guards which equipped with a piston engine and can travel a distance of 450 kilometers in a one-way mission.

== See also ==
- Iranian military industry
- List of countries by level of military equipment

Lists of equipment

- List of military equipment manufactured in Iran
- List of aircraft of the Iranian Air Force
- List of aircraft of the Aerospace Force of the Islamic Revolutionary Guard Corps
- List of equipment of the Islamic Republic of Iran Air Defense Force
- List of current ships of the Islamic Republic of Iran Navy
- List of equipment of the Navy of the Islamic Revolutionary Guard Corps
- Tanks of Iran
