= Hoveyzeh (APC) =

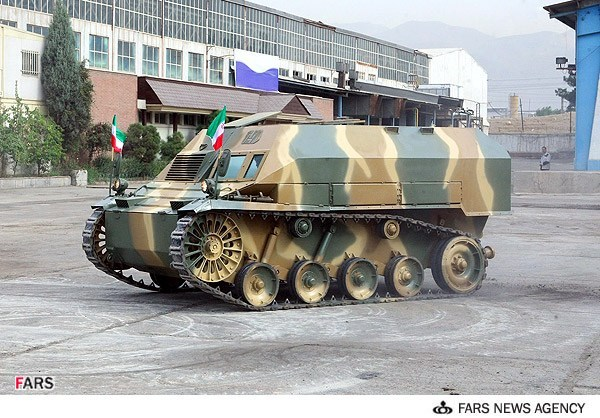
- Type: Armoured personnel carrier
- Place of origin: Iran

Service history
- Used by: Armed Forces of the Islamic Republic of Iran

Production history
- Manufacturer: Defense Industries Organization (Iran)
- Produced: unveiled in August 2012

Specifications
- Crew: 4 passengers + 1 driver
- Engine: diesel

The Hoveyzeh or Howeizeh (Persian: نفربر هویزه) is an Iranian super-light tracked armored personnel carrier which was unveiled in September 2012. This vehicle has the capability to carry weapons and diverse equipment; and can operate at night by having ability to be used quickly and easily, appropriate speed, effective camouflage and facile-hiding. Among other features of "Hovezyeh armored-vehicle" are: feasibility of easy transportation, possibility of air transportation by plane/helicopter, usability in different missions of the Armed Forces, and so on.

Hoveyzeh armored vehicle can be utilized at border-checkpoints to fight criminals and fight against drug-trafficking as well as other military and law enforcement operations. Hoveyzeh is also used in civilian affairs, such as in unforeseen events, etc. According to Tasnim-News: presumably, the Hoveyzeh can carry four passengers as well as the driver, and a periscope has been installed for each passenger in order to allow outside visibility.

A list of Iranian military vehicles published in 2020 described the Hoveyzeh as a prototype that did not enter mass production.

== See also ==
- Military of Iran
- Iranian military industry
- Equipment of the Iranian army
- Tanks of Iran
