= Neynava truck =

Iranian military truck family

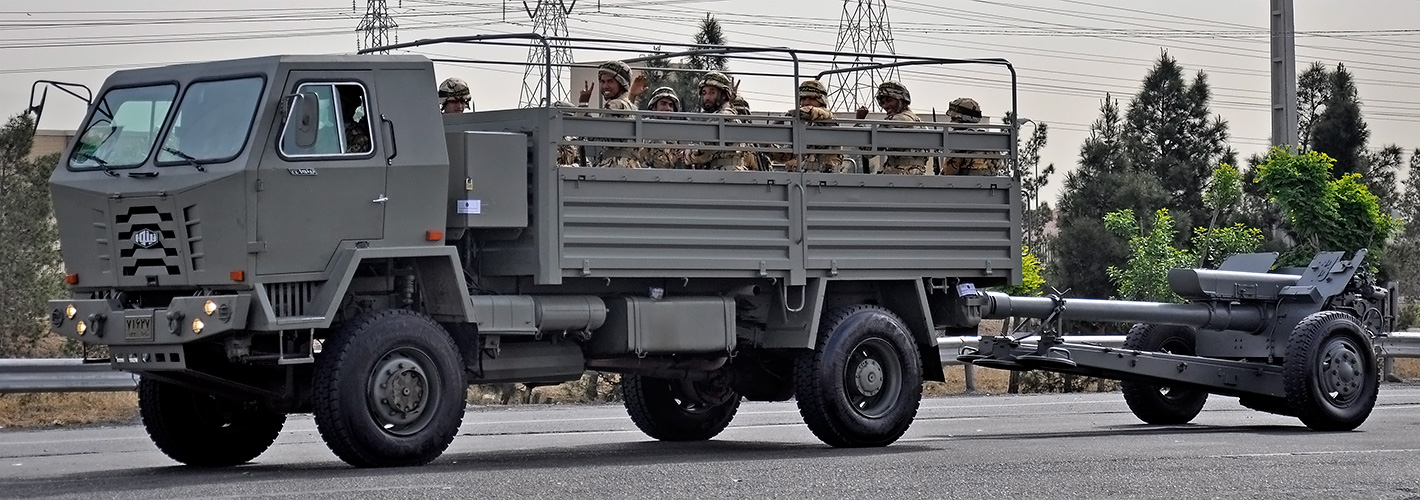

Neynava or Neinava is a series of all-terrain general purpose 4×4 military trucks produced by the Research and Self-Sufficiency Jihad (Struggle) Organization of the Army of Iran. The vehicle first appeared in military parades in 2011, but was officially unveiled in 2012 along with Shaher (sniper rifle). Its purpose is to carry troops, supplies and small armored vehicles like Sayyad and also tow artillery pieces. Iran currently has 15,000 of them

== Specifications ==
Seating (cab): 1+1
Configuration: 4x4
Weight (empty): 2.5 tonnes
Maximum Load: 5 tonnes (on road), 2.5 tonnes (cross-country)
Length: 7 m
Width: 2.5 m
Height: 2.8 m
Engine Power: 240 hp
Power to weight ratio: 33 hp/tonnes (full load)

== See also ==
- Military of Iran
- Iranian military industry
- Equipment of the Iranian army
