= Razm Mortar =

Razm
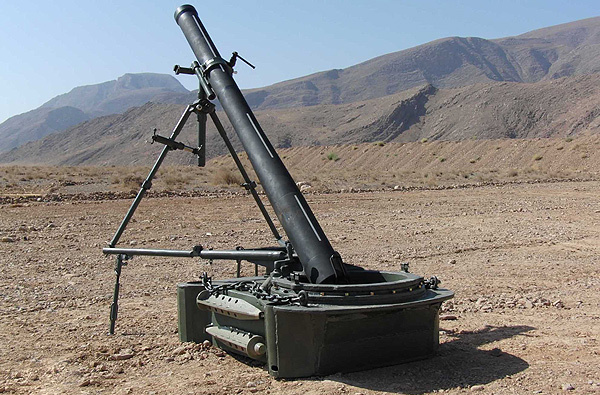
- Type: Heavy mortar
- Place of origin: Iran

Service history
- In service: Iranian Army

Production history
- Manufacturer: DIO
- Produced: 2010–Present

Specifications
- Calibre: 120 mm (4.7 in)
- Carriage: Vehicle
- Effective firing range: 16,000 m (17,000 yd) with rocket-assisted projectile

Razm is an Iranian 120 mm heavy mortar unveiled in 2010 and produced by Iran's Defense Industries Organization. It is a long-range mortar with range of 16 km with rocket-assisted munitions and can be used alongside tube artillery. To achieve this range, Razm uses an unusually long barrel, and is very heavy. The overall design of the mortar is similar to that of 120 mm HM 16.
