= Raad-1 =

Raad-1 / Thunder-1
- Type: Self-propelled artillery
- Place of origin: Iran

Service history
- Used by: Iran
- Wars: none

Production history
- Designer: Defense Industries Organization
- Designed: May 1996
- Produced: 1996–unknown

Specifications
- Mass: 17.5 tonnes
- Length: 6.72 m
- Width: 3.10 m
- Height: 1.66 m (without the turret)
- Crew: 4 (Commander, driver, gunner and loader)
- Effective firing range: 15.2 km
- Main armament: 122mm 2A18 howitzer
- Secondary armament: none
- Engine: V-8 diesel 330 hp (246 kW)
- Suspension: Torsion bar
- Operational range: 500 km
- Maximum speed: 65 km/h

Raad-1 ('Thunder-1') is an Iranian self-propelled howitzer.

== History ==
In May 1996, Iran claimed to have successfully tested its first locally made self-propelled howitzer, the 122 mm Raad-1 ("Thunder-1").

The Raad-1 did not enter production. Analysts think most likely it was just a prototype used to develop the Raad-2.

== Description ==
It is armed with 122 mm 2A18 howitzer from 2S1 Gvozdika self-propelled howitzer or a modification of one with an effective firing range of 15,200 meters. The turret is also from the 2S1 Gvozdika. It uses the Iranian-made Boragh APC chassis, a conversion of either the Russian BMP-1 or Chinese Type 86 (WZ-501) IFV. The engine is believed to be the 12.8 l German BF8L diesel engine, but this is not known for sure.

== See also ==
- Tanks of Iran
- Raad – Iranian anti tank missile.
- Raad-2
