= Sayyad (armoured fighting vehicle) =

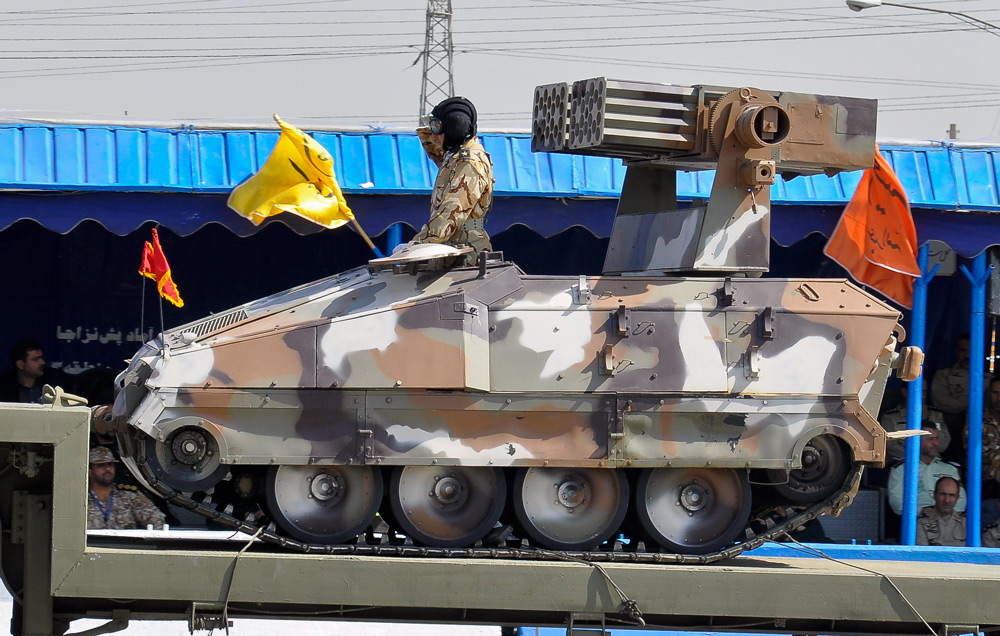
- Sayyad with rocket launcher
- Type: Quick reaction armored vehicle
- Place of origin: Iran

Service history
- Used by: Iran

Production history
- Manufacturer: Defense Industries Organization
- Produced: 2010

Specifications
- Armor: Steel
- Main armament: Single or double Toophan anti-tank missile launchers or two 23x 77 millimetres (3.0 in) rocket launchers or single 12.7 mm Moharram rotary machine gun
- Engine: Diesel
- Suspension: Torsion bar

The Sayyad AFV is an Iranian light, multi-purpose, tracked armored vehicle, sometimes described as a "quick reaction tank".

The overall design is similar to that of the British FV102 Striker, and it is often mistaken for the Tosan tank. However, there are some major differences between the Sayyad and the Striker. The Sayyad is shorter in length than the Striker, and it has one less road wheel. The hull is slightly redesigned and storage baskets have also been added.

The vehicle is intended to be used to provide a fast platform for anti-tank missiles and small artillery rockets. It entered service in 2010.

== Variants ==
There are two variants of the Sayyad. One with either a single or a double Toophan anti-tank missile launcher, with six reload missiles in storage baskets. The other is a multiple rocket launcher variant with two 23 tube launchers for 77 mm rockets.

== See also ==
- Tanks of Iran
