= Rezvan missile =

Iranian missile

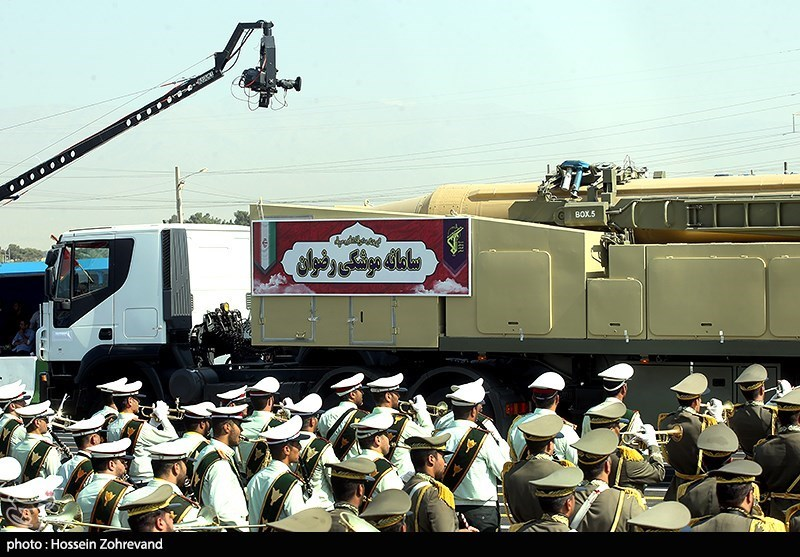
- Sacred Defence Week parade, 2022, in Tehran
- Type: Tactical MRBM
- Place of origin: Iran

Service history
- In service: 22 September 2022–present
- Used by: IRGCASF
- Wars: 2024

Specifications
- Length: 12 m
- Diameter: 0.88 meters
- Engine: liquid fuel rocket
- Operational range: 1400 km
- Maximum speed: Mach 8

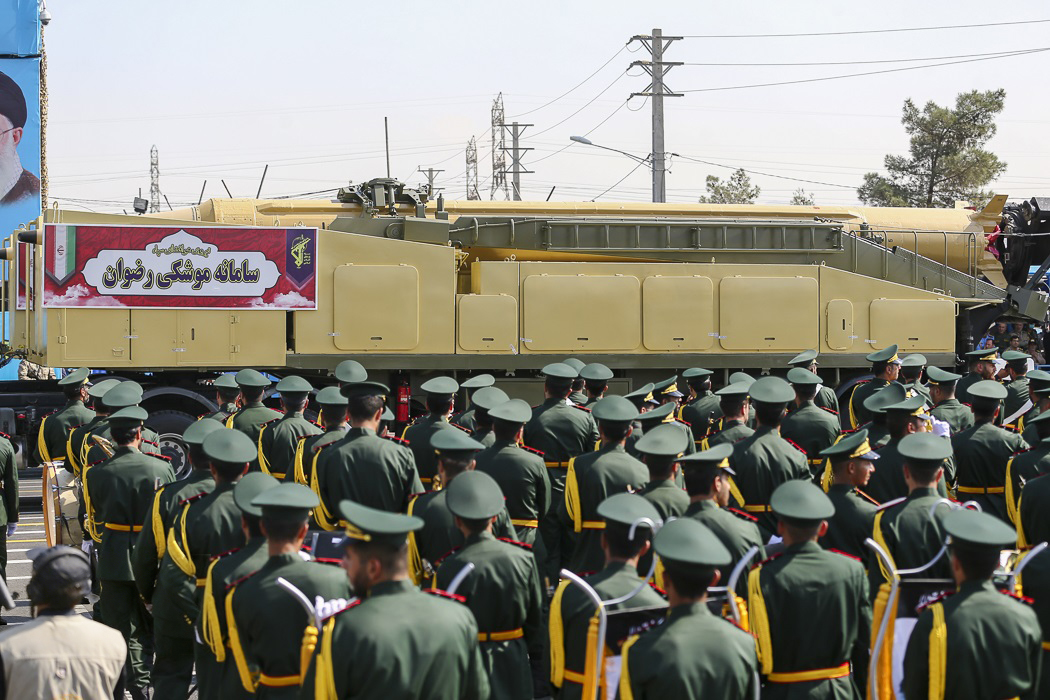
Rezvan missile

Rezvan is a single-stage liquid-propellant missile with a detachable warhead with a range of up to 1,400 kilometers that can be launched from a variety of fixed and mobile platforms.

The commander of the Islamic Revolutionary Guard Corps (IRGC) touted the Rezvan missile as a missile capable of penetrating the atmosphere at eight times the speed of sound.

This ballistic missile saw extensive use in the April 2024 Iranian ballistic missile strikes.

== Features ==
- Precision-guided surface-to-surface ballistic missile
- Range of about 1,400 km
- Liquid-fuel engine
- Detachable warhead with high explosive
- Reaches Mach 8 (about 9,800 km/h) upon entering the atmosphere
- Can be launched from a fixed or mobile platform
- Good maneuverability and high accuracy in reaching the target

== See also ==
- Haj Qasem (missile)
- Abu Mahdi (missile)
- Ministry of Defence and Armed Forces Logistics (Iran)
- List of military equipment manufactured in Iran
- Science and technology in Iran
- Military of Iran
- Iranian military industry
- Equipment of the Iranian Army
