= HM 12 =

HM 12 60mm Mortar
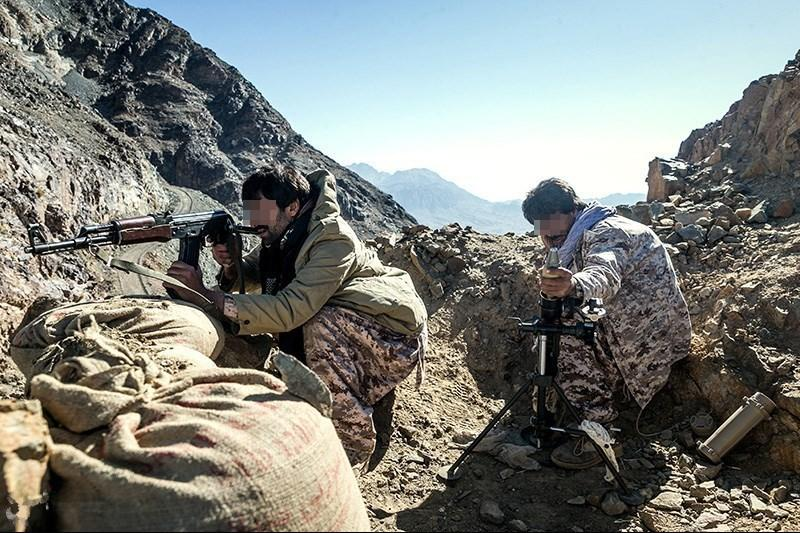
- Type: Mortar
- Place of origin: Iran

Service history
- Used by: Iran
- Wars: Syrian Civil War; Iraqi Civil War

Production history
- Manufacturer: Defense Industries Organization

Specifications
- Mass: 6,5 kg
- Barrel length: 677mm
- Crew: 2
- Caliber: 60 mm
- Elevation: 45° to 85°
- Traverse: 360°
- Rate of fire: 20 round per minute
- Maximum firing range: 1050m

The HM 12 Fateh (or Hadid) is an Iranian 60mm mortar manufactured by the Ammunition & Metallurgy Industries Group, part of Iran's Defense Industries Organization. It is an unlicensed copy of Israel's Soltam 60 mm mortar. It is generally operated by two people but in urgent cases it can be operated by one as well.

External images
- HM-12
- Photo
- Vehicle mounted

== Users ==
- Iran
- Syria
- Popular Mobilization Forces
- Northern Alliance
