= Qods Raad 85 =

Iranian loitering munition drone

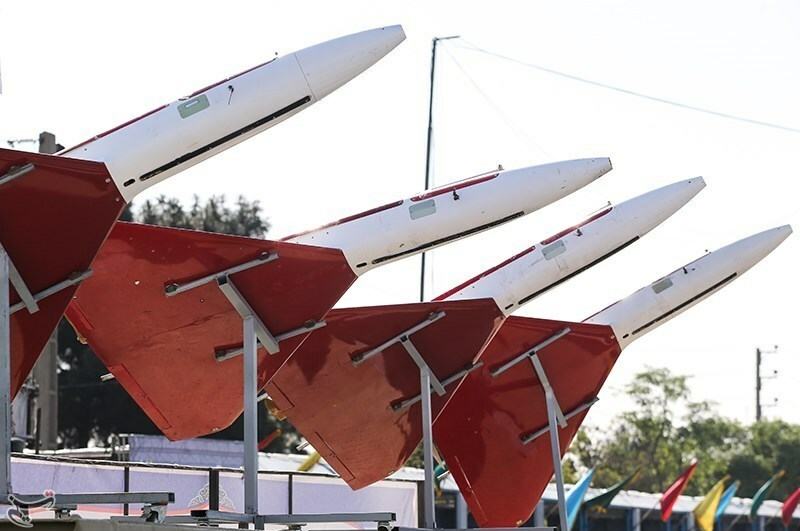
Raad 85

The Raad 85 (Thunder 85) (Also R'ad 85, Ra'ad 85, etc) is an Iranian one-way attack drone developed in the 2010s.

== History ==
It was designed by the Iranian Army's Research and Self-sufficiency Jihad Organization in cooperation with Qods Aviation for the Iranian Army Ground Force. It is an unmanned "suicide drone" that is remotely guided to its target by a human operator. It is designed to be operated in an electronic warfare environment.

General Ahmad Reza Pourdastan of the Iranian Armed Forces has stated, "This drone is like a mobile bomb, and is capable of destroying fixed and mobile targets."

In 2015, five Ra’ad-85 drones were used to strike an Ahrar Al-Sham military base in Syria’s Idlib province, as part of the Syrian Civil War.

== Specifications ==
- Ceiling: 11000 ft
- Top Speed: 250 km/h
- Combat radius: 100 km
- Avionics: transmitting imagery
