= Saegheh (rocket) =

Iranian anti-personnel RPG-7 warhead

Saegheh APERS RPG-7 Warhead

The Saegheh is an Iranian anti-personnel RPG-7 warhead. It was developed to extend the utility of the RPG-7 portable rocket-propelled grenade (RPG) in service with the Iranian forces. It replaces the standard 30mm warhead with a high-explosive 40mm warhead with prefragmented steel warhead body.

== Specifications ==
- Calibre: 40 mm
- Weight: rocket, 1.4 kg; warhead, 1.1 kg
- Length: rocket, 590 mm; warhead, 310 mm
- Max velocity: 150 m/s
- Max range: 1,800 m

== See also ==
- RPG-7
- Islamic Republic of Iran Armed Forces
- Defense industry of Iran
- List of equipment of the Iranian Army
- Historical equipment of the Iranian Army
