= HESA Sofreh Mahi =

Iranian unmanned combat aerial vehicle

Sofreh Mahi
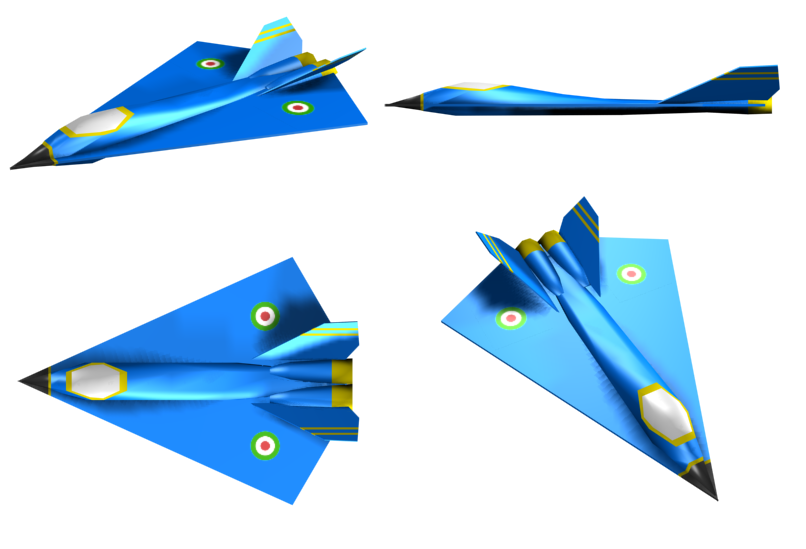

General information
- Type: Stealth Unmanned combat aerial vehicle
- Manufacturer: Iran Aircraft Manufacturing Industrial Company
- Status: Under Development
- Primary user: Iran

Sofreh Mâhi (Persian: سفره ماهی, "Eagle ray") is an Iranian stealth UCAV under development. Little is known about the drone but scaled down mock-ups shown during Iranian Army Day 2010 parade show that it has a flat diamond shape body with twin vertical stabilizers. First reference to the drone was given by Lieutenant Commander of the Iranian Air Force General Aziz Nasirzadeh who reported that the first tests of the drone were finished.

== Development ==
External images
- Some Pictures taken from mock ups in Iranian Army parades
- Another view of mock up
- The unknown fighter model shown alongside
- Mock up
- Fighter mock up in Army day 2010
- Both mock ups during army day 2010
- Sofreh Mahi flight

Iran officially stated that it is working on a stealth UCAV named Sofreh Mahi on 7 Feb. 2010. Iranian officials reported that the drone has a shape similar to the Eagle ray resulting in the drone being called the Sofreh Mahi (the Persian for "Eagle Ray"). The drone is also made out of special materials that absorb radar energy. These two features give it the ability to evade enemy radars.

General Aziz Nasirzadeh, Lieutenant Commander of the Iranian Army Air Force, stated that the UAV 'Sofreh Mahi' has been designed and manufactured for reconnaissance and bombing missions, considering its radar-evading capability.

General Nasirzadeh also announced that once the aircraft passes further tests, and its features and capabilities are completed, the Defense Ministry will begin the production. "Production of the actual size as well as mounting and testing weapons and a number of systems on the aircraft are the next phases before we can start its mass production", Nasirzadeh said.

In February 2011 Iran announced that it is going to build and test a real scale model of the plane, however this is a long process and can take a long time to finish. Nasirzadeh said that "It is just one of Iran's UAV projects and one of our goals is to produce such planes. Because the world is moving towards that direction."

== Specifications ==
This Iranian bird is about 1.2 meters long and has a wingspan of over 2.22 meters, and uses a combustion engine with a plastic propeller in front of the body to fly; on the other hand, the prototype of the fish-stinging bird has a maximum flight range of about 2,000 meters, a range of about 15 kilometers, a flight duration of 60 minutes, and a speed of about 170 kilometers per hour.

== See also ==
- List of equipment of the Iranian Army

Aircraft of comparable role, configuration, and era

- BAE Taranis
- Dassault nEUROn
