= Fateh rifle =

Iranian assault rifle

The Fateh
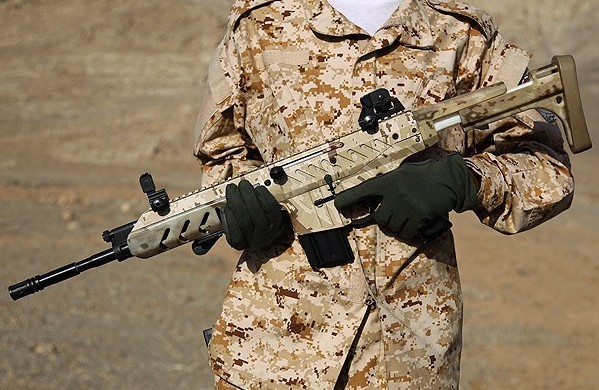
- Type: Assault rifle
- Place of origin: Iran

Production history
- Designer: Defense Industries Organization
- Manufacturer: Defense Industries Organization
- Produced: 2014

Specifications
- Mass: 3.4 kg (with 400 mm long barrel and empty 30-round magazine)
- Length: 940 mm (stock extended); 699 mm (stock retracted)
- Barrel length: 406mm
- Cartridge: 5.56×45mm NATO
- Caliber: 5.56mm
- Action: Gas-operated, rotating bolt
- Rate of fire: 600-850 round/min, cyclic
- Muzzle velocity: 850 m/s
- Effective firing range: 500 m
- Feed system: Various STANAG Magazines
- Sights: Iron sights Various scopes/sights can be attached on the Picatinny rail via carry handle. Red dot sight Night-vision device

The Fateh (Persian: فاتح) is an Iranian assault rifle developed by the Islamic Revolutionary Guard Corps Ground Forces, (IRGC). This assault rifle uses gas-operated reloading, using a 5.56×45mm NATO caliber from 30-round STANAG magazine. The IRGC initially introduced the Fateh rifle's prototype in 2014, but in 2016 the Iranian military discontinued it.

== History ==
The early version of the Fateh rifle revealed in 2014 had a telescopic shoulder stock, which could be collapsed or retracted. This stock had an all-metal construction, except the plastic cheek piece and butt pad. The first models came with 20-round magazines, while the latter variant came with 30-rounders. This weapon also appears to use 40-round magazines and M16-style mags.

== Design ==
The Fateh assault rifle is chambered with 5.56×45mm NATO ammunition with a gas piston system. A tiny tube is attached to the barrel assembly to recycle the gas generated by each discharged bullet.

An upper rail mount stretched almost the entire length of the weapon, offering ample space for detachable optics and sights. The receiver looked similar to Remington ACR with a NATO standard 30-round magazine. There are accessories for various add-ons, such as vertical grip, bipods, laser pointers, or tactical lights. The muzzle brake of the Fateh is similar to the M16 rifle.

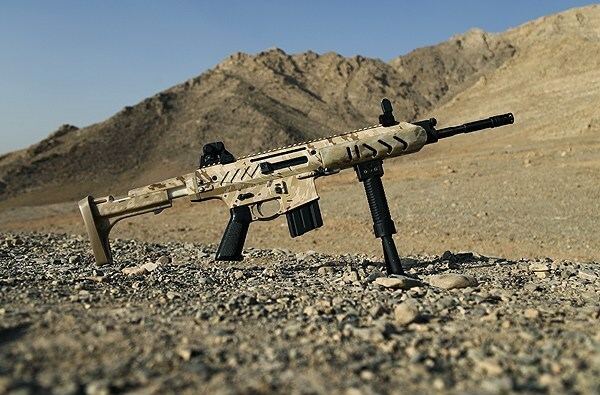
The Fateh rifle right side view equipped with a grip bipod.

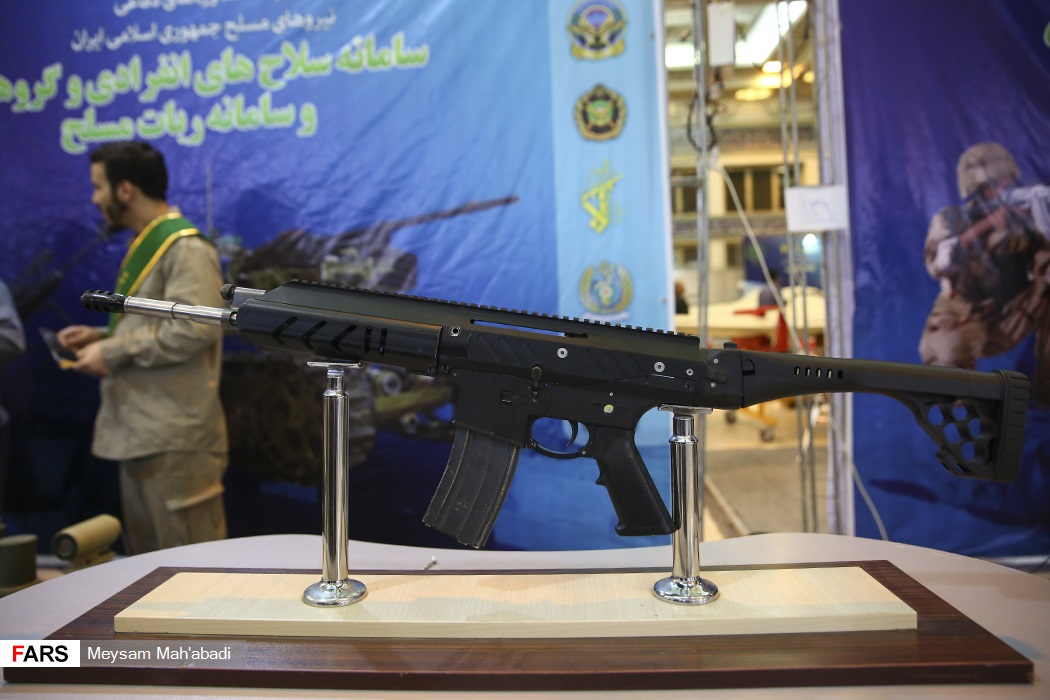
The early prototype model of the Fateh rifle, shown at the Eqtedar 40 Defence Exhibition.

== Users ==
- Iran:Islamic Revolutionary Guard Corps Ground Forces (IRGC)
