= Tanks of Iran =

Tanks have been utilized in Iran both within the military and within several conflicts with their usage and origin after World War II; the Cold War; and the modern era. This includes internal Iranian made tanks, British designs imported after World War II, and American and imported Soviet tanks and those from China as well.

== Overview ==
Iran originally had ordered tanks from Czechoslovakia before the war began but then it got tanks from Great Britain after World War II when it oversaw Iran. From these beginnings the modern Iranian Armoured forces grew and procured modern armoured fighting vehicles from the United States and the United Kingdom that served during the Cold War, and various operations. One of the main Iranian operations using armor such as the U.S. M60 and British Chieftain, was during the Iran–Iraq War, and now is importing Russian models and making its own designs.

== History ==
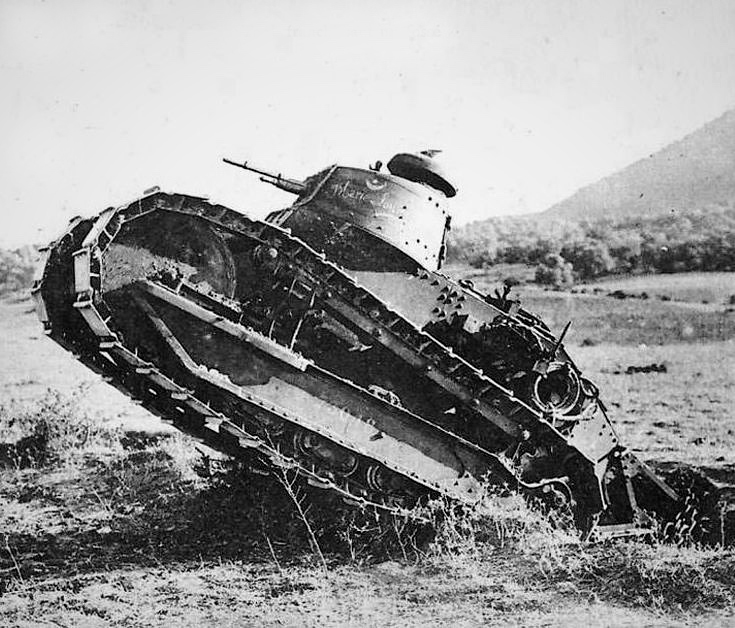
Iran ordered 100 of the FT tank in the 1930s.

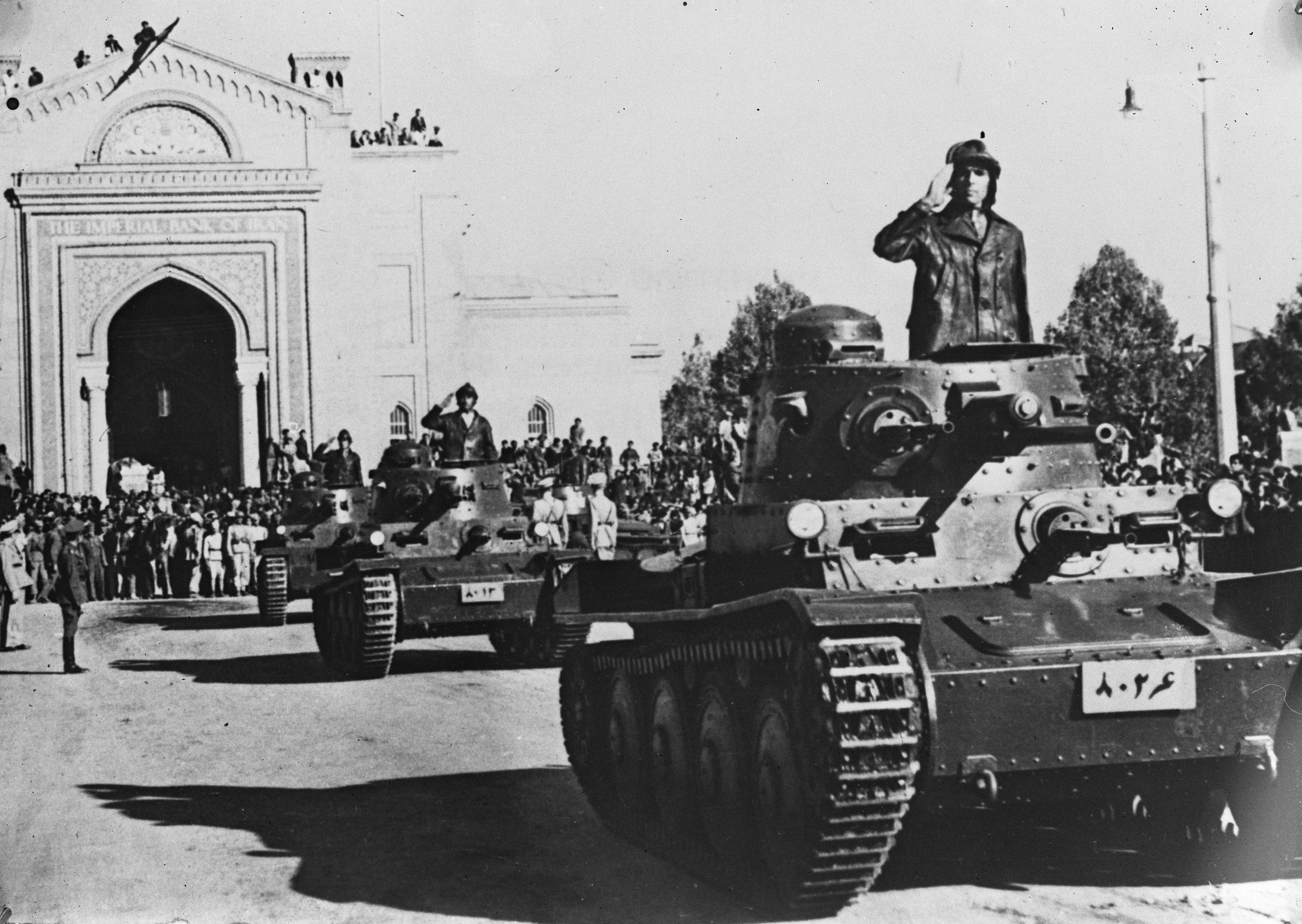
Iran ordered CKD-TNH 60/Panzer 38(t) tanks, in 1941

Several tanks were used in Iran in the 1930s (such as 100 of the FT tank) as it ordered and had delivered in 1937-38 tanks such as the CKD AH-IV tankette used by the 1st infantry division and the CKD-TNH 60/Panzer 38(t) of the 2nd infantry division in 1941 and the Imperial Guards. Iran was the first customer for the AH-IV and ordered fifty plus a prototype in 1935 for delivery the following year. Deliveries began in August 1936 with the last batch arriving in Iran in May 1937, although the armament was shipped separately and wasn't installed until November 1937. The Iranians planned to order between 100 and 300 additional AH-IVs, but the outbreak of World War II prevented any follow-through. The small AH-IV tankettes could only climb an obstacle .5 metres (1.6 ft) high, had a range of 150 kilometres (93 mi) and a ground pressure of only 0.45 kg/cm^{2} and used the ZB vz. 26 and 35 machine guns.

These tanks faced the more than 1000 Soviet tanks in the Anglo-Soviet invasion in August 1941. The Soviet Union invaded from the north with the armored forces occupying Iran's northern provinces and the British coming from the South. The Soviets used about 1,000 T-26 tanks for their combat operations against the Iranian forces.

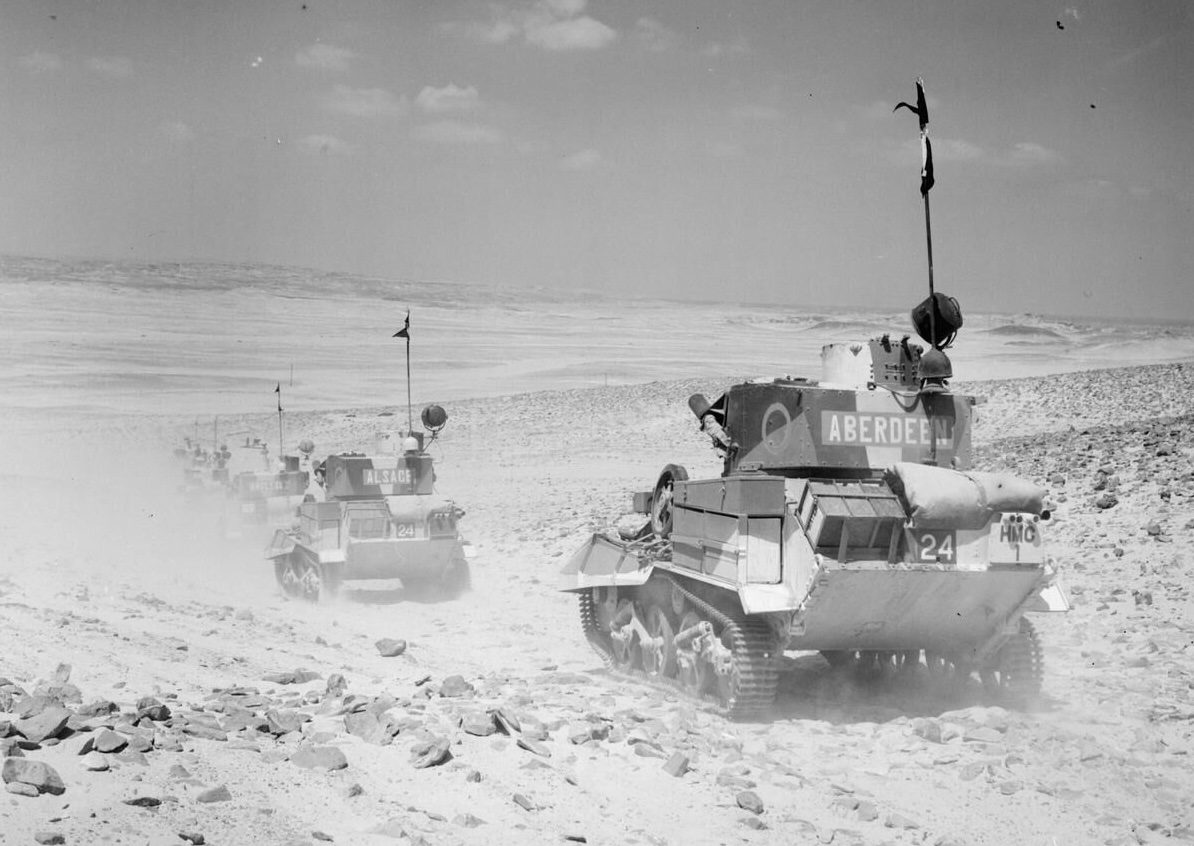
British Vickers light tanks in the desert

In the Allied occupation of southern Iran, the British used the 4th British Cavalry Brigade (later renamed 9th Armoured Brigade). The United Kingdom's assembled the Iraq Command which was renamed "Persia and Iraq Force" or Paiforce. Paiforce composed of the 8th and 10th Indian Infantry Divisions and an independent brigade each of armor, cavalry and infantry. The invading Allies had over 200,000 troops and modern tanks, and artillery. The British tanks consisted mostly of the Mark IVb light tanks armed with .50 caliber Vickers machine gun.

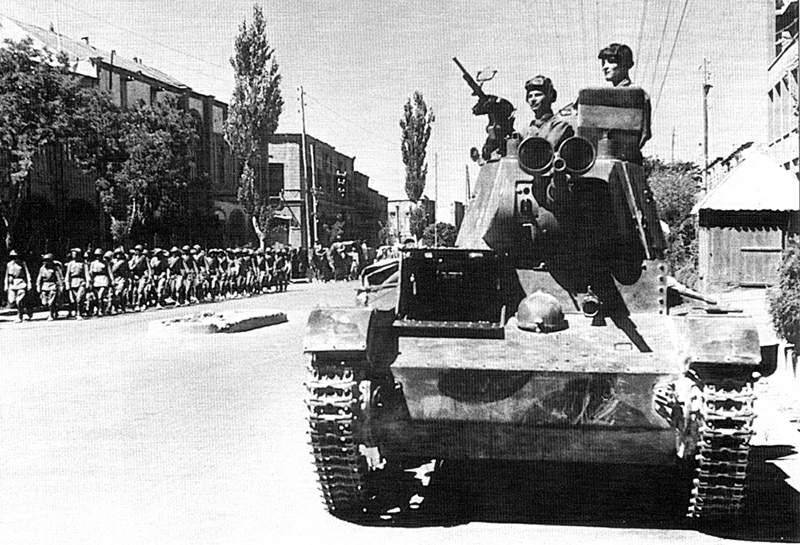
Soviet tankmen of the 6th Armoured Division driving a T-26 through the streets of Tabriz during the Anglo-Soviet invasion of Iran.

In response to the invasion, the Iranian Army mobilised two armoured divisions with their tanks and nine infantry divisions, some of them motorised. The Iranian army had a standing force of 126,000–200,000 men. While Iran had taken numerous steps through the previous decade to strengthen, standardise and create a modern army, they did not have enough armour and air power to fight a multi-front war. Reza Shah's modernisations had not been completed by the time war broke out and the Iranian Army had been more concerned with civilian repression than invasions.

The Iranian army was armed with several models of tanks for its armoured forces, as Iran had bought 100 FT-6 in addition to the CKD-TNH 60 light tanks and additional LaFrance TK-6 armoured cars, enough to fully outfit their 1st and 2nd divisions. While it was a large order and they were excellent tanks, they were not enough to defeat a multi-front invasion by two great powers. The changing nature of tank warfare in the 1930s made all but 50 of them obsolete when the invasion began.

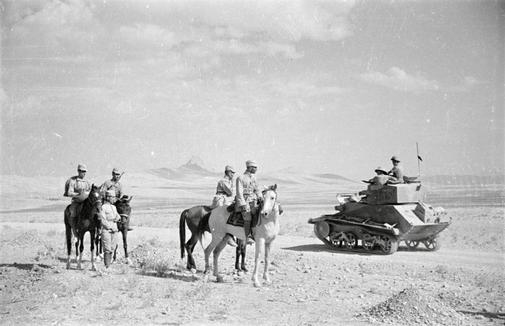
Soviet and British soldiers rendezvous near Qazvin.

The Iranians had little time to organise a defence, as the Allies achieved a tactical surprise. The Allies quickly moved their tanks and infantry against the Iranian forces as Reza Shah refused requests by his generals to destroy the road and transportation networks, largely because he did not want to damage the infrastructure that he had painstakingly built during his reign. That contributed to the speedy victory of the Allies. With no allies, Iranian resistance was rapidly overwhelmed and neutralised by Soviet and British tanks and infantry.

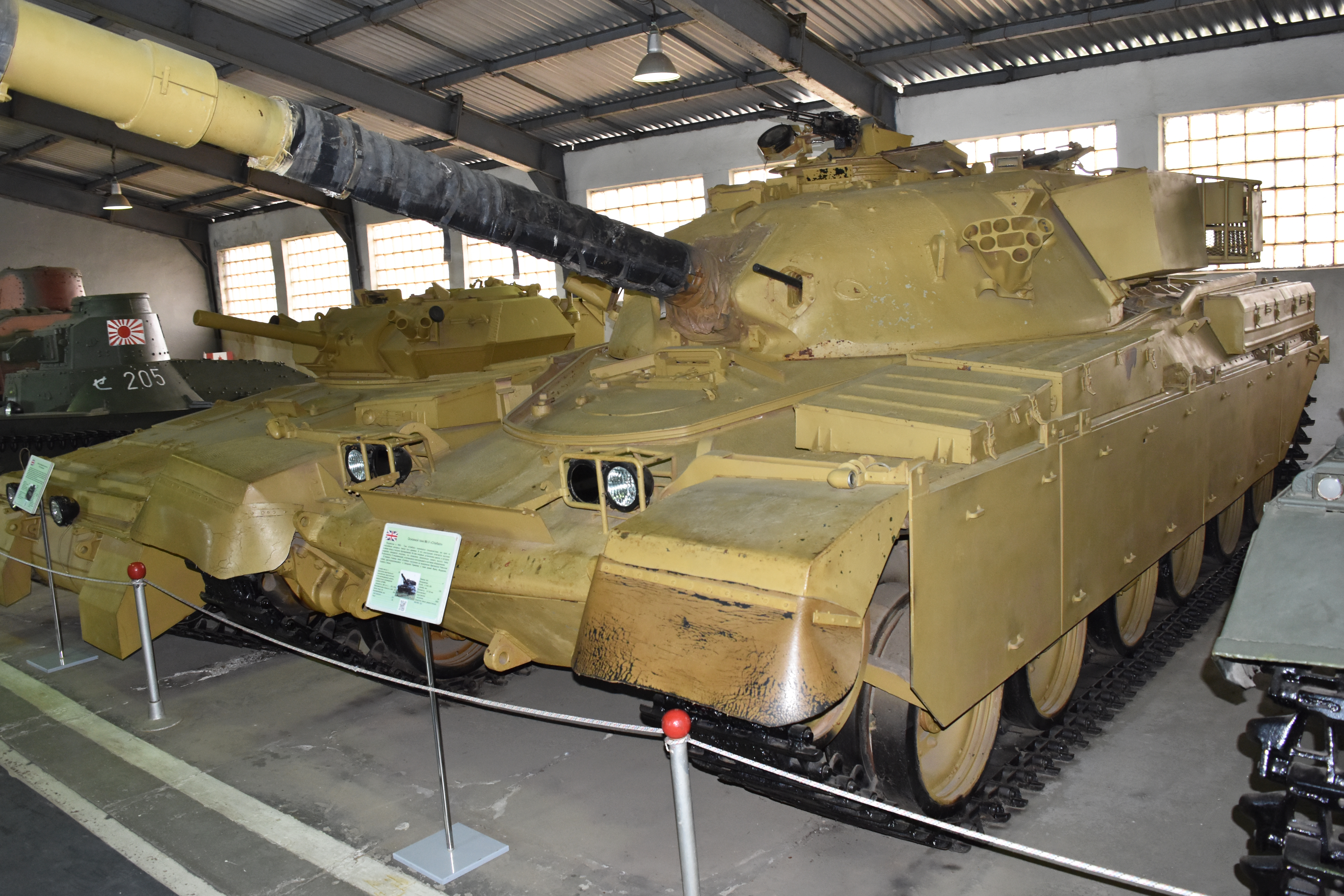
Iranian Army Chieftain Mk.5 main battle tank on display at the Kubinka Tank Museum

After the war, the Russians refused to leave at first and actually sent Soviet reinforcements of at least 200 tanks in 15 brigades to Tabrīz and deployed south toward Qazvīn, and at the Turkish border and the Iraqi border. The Russians finally left after pressure from Britain and the US and not long afterwards, Iran received WWII tanks from the British to rebuild its armoured forces during the 1950s. Then it sought more modern tanks in the 1960s and got MBTs such as the Chieftain in large numbers. The largest foreign sale of the Chieftain tanks was in fact to Iran, which took delivery of 707 Mk-3P and Mk-5P (the letter P standing for Persia), as well as 187 FV4030-1, 41 ARV and 14 AVLB before the 1979 revolution. Iran also turned to America for tanks such as the M47/M48 and M60A1, spending over 8 billion during the 1970s. But after the Shah was overthrown in 1979, Iran turned to other sources and imported from Russia and China such as the T-72S, T-62s, and T-54/T-55/Type 59s but these were in limited numbers and Iran made some tanks domestically.

After the Islamic Revolution in 1979, the regular army and air force had suffered due to purges and lack of supplies and spare parts from their former Western allies, especially the US and UK, left it vulnerable. On September 22, 1980, Iraqi military forces under the command of Saddam Hussein invaded Iran. Iran received 300 Type 59 tanks from North Korea and China during the Iran–Iraq War. They were fielded by both the regular Artesh and the Islamic Revolutionary Guard Corps. The Iraqi T-72s proved highly superior to the Chinese tank.

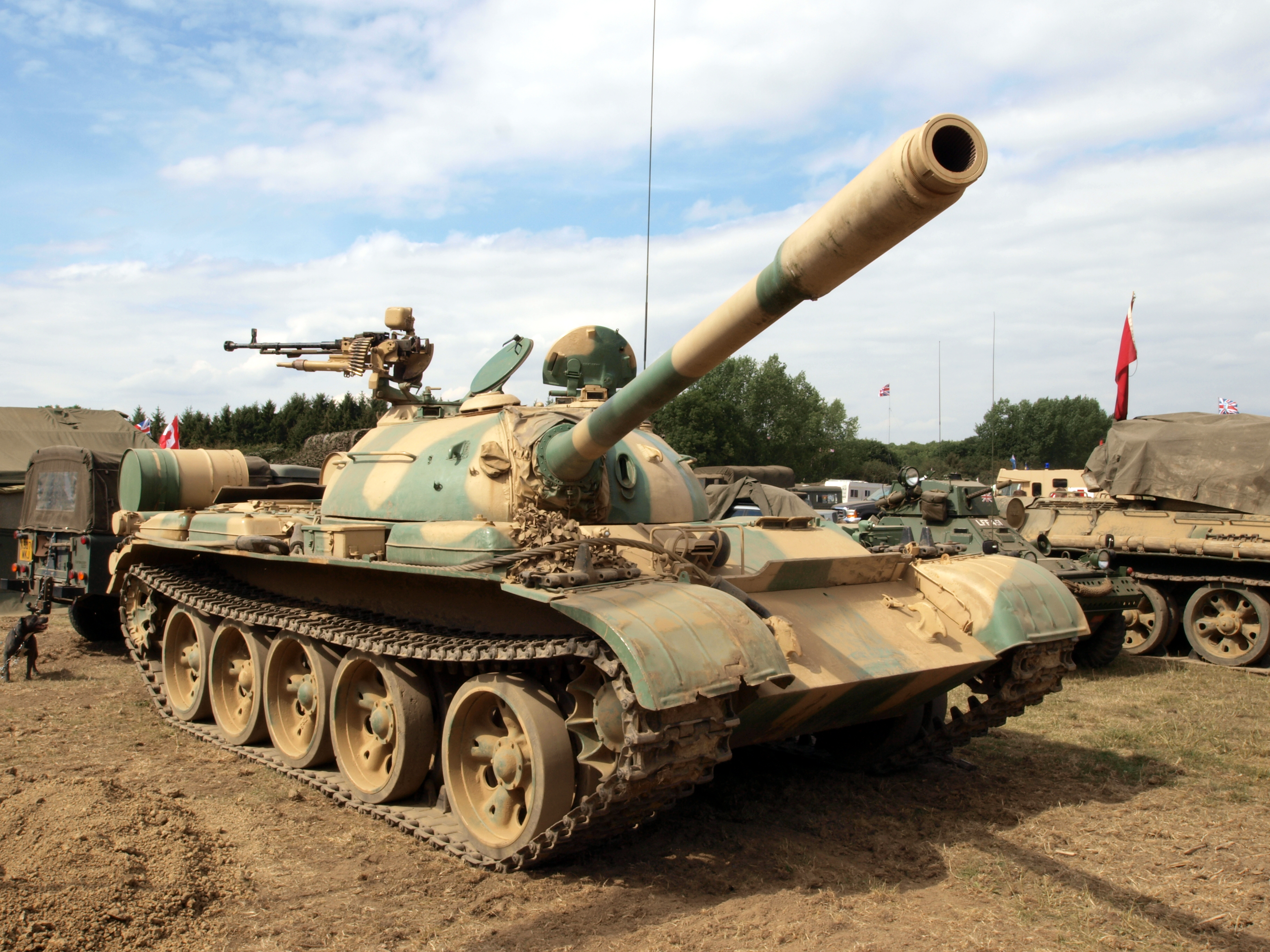
A Type 59 tank

The Chieftain tank and along with the M60 tank was used extensively by Iran during the Iran–Iraq War of 1980–88, including the largest tank battle of the war, with mixed results as the Chieftain Mk 3/5 suffered from chronic engine problems and low power-to-weight ratio, making the Chieftain unreliable and slow when maneuvering over harsh terrain, which in turn made it prone to breakdowns in the midst of battle or a sluggish target and thus vulnerable to enemy tank fire. Out of the 875 Chieftain tanks that had started the war only 200 were left. The Iranians captured many Iraqi tanks and Operation Ramadan was launched at Baghdad with over 100,000 Revolutionary Guards backed by M60 and Chieftain tanks, including many captured T-55s, but the Iraqi tanks and infantry repelled it. By end of the war, the Iranian tried one last attack, in Operation Karbala, with a large force of their tanks with the Revolutionary Guard's 31st Ashura and the Army's 77th Khorasan armored divisions, which depleted the tank forces as well as the infantry.

While the Iranian Army used mainly the British Chieftain and American M60 during the Iran–Iraq War, it moved to acquire newer main battle tanks to modernize its forces. It received 104 T-72M1 battle tanks from former Soviet Bloc nations and received a licence from Russia to produce T-72S battle tanks domestically. With this they made over 2500 T-72S battle tanks which it put into its armoured divisions.

Iran announced on 12 March 2017 it has an indigenous main battle tank, the Karrar (striker), which is an upgraded version of the Iranian T-72S tank, where it was stated that it possessed an electro-optical fire control system, a laser rangefinder, ballistic computer and could fire at both stationary and mobile targets in day or night.

It also has the Zulfiqar (tank) named after the twin-pointed legendary sword of Ali, and was developed from major components of the American M-60 tank. The IISS estimates that around 150 Zulfiqar 1s are now in service.

== Overview of Tanks ==
=== Light and medium tanks ===
Model	Type	In Service		Origin	Image	Notes
Tosan	Light tank	20	1997	Iran		Tosan is a domestically produced light tank, based on the FV101 Scorpion

=== Main battle tanks ===
Model	Type	In Service		Origin	Image	Notes
Chieftain Mobarez	Main battle tank	100(Chieftain) -Mobarez ~50	1971-1979	United Kingdom; Pahlavi Iran		707 Mk-3P and Mk-5P, 125–189 FV-4030-1, 41 ARV and 14 AVLB obtained before the 1979 revolution. Further planned deliveries of the more capable 4030 series were cancelled at that point. 100 in service as of 2005.Many others upgraded to Mobarez
M60A1	Main battle tank	200	1969-1970	United States; Pahlavi Iran		Some sources claim ~150 M60. Locally modernized as the Samsam.
T-72S T-72 Khorrhamshahr	Main battle tank Main battle tank	563(25 T-72M1s) -10?	1994–1999 1990s	Soviet Union; Iran Iran		Iran produced 2538 T-72S tanks under licence from Russia from 1993 to 2012, received 104 T-72M1 tanks from Poland from 1994 to 1995 and 37 T-72M1 tanks from Belarus starting in 2000, T-72M1 used in limited services. Possible unlicensed production, around 2000 in inventory including 1500 T-72S and 500 less capable T-72M/M1.T-72 fitted with T-80 turret and using Kontakt-5 ERA
T-72Z Safir-74	Main battle tank	Approximately 400 with around 10 said to still be in service.		Soviet Union Iran		Modernized T-54/55 which have been replaced with the Zulfiqar 3 tanks and soon the Karrar tank.
Zulfiqar MBT 3 Zulfiqar MBT 2 Zulfiqar MBT 1	Main battle tank	200 (More Scheduled for Production) 1(prototype) 100	1996–present	Soviet Union; United States Iran		Based on M60 and T-72. Featuring EFCS-3 fire control system and autoloader. The Zulfiqar 3 is the latest model in the family which has been heavily modernized with advanced technologies and armaments. It is equipped with the 2A46 125 mm smoothbore cannon, a laser rangefinder, RAM camouflage and a new fire control system.
Karrar	Main battle tank	800	2016	Iran		Both IRGC and Iran armed forces ordered about 800 Karrar tanks from local industry

=== Self-propelled artillery ===
Model	Type	In Service		Origin	Image	Notes
2S1 Gvozdika	122mm self-propelled howitzer	60		Soviet Union		
Raad 1	122mm self-propelled howitzer	100	1996	Iran		Based on 2S1 Gvozdika
Raad 2	155mm self-propelled howitzer	150	1997	Iran		Based on M109
M109A1	155mm self-propelled howitzer	180		United States/Iran		Remanufactured locally as the Hoveyzeh.
M-1978	170mm self-propelled howitzer	20		North Korea		
M-107	175mm self-propelled howitzer	30		United States		
M-110	203mm self-propelled howitzer	30		United States		

== See also ==
- History of the tank
- Tanks in World War II
- Tank classification
- List of military vehicles
- List of equipment of the Iranian Army § Combat vehicles

== Sources ==
- Razoux, Pierre (2015). The Iran-Iraq War. Translated by Elliott, Nicholas. Cambridge, Massachusetts: Harvard University Press. ISBN 978-0-674-08863-4.
