= Tosan tank =

Tosan
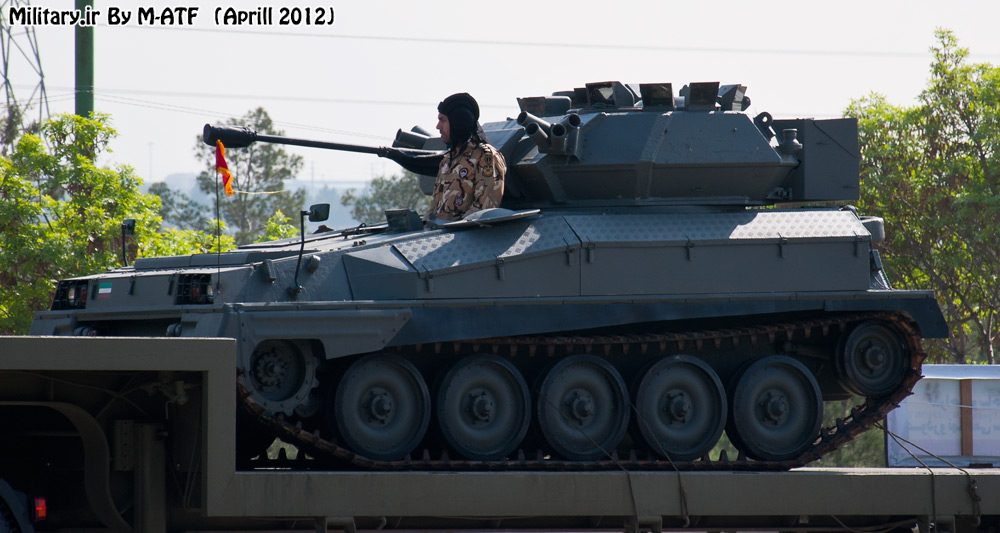
- A supposed Tosan light tank during an Army Day parade in 2013.
- Type: Light tank
- Place of origin: Iran

Service history
- In service: 1997–present
- Used by: See Operators

Production history
- Produced: 1997

Specifications
- Mass: ~ 8 tonnes
- Length: 4.9 m
- Width: 2.2 m
- Height: 2.1 m
- Crew: 3
- Armour: 12.7 mm
- Main armament: 90 mm gun or 30 mm 2A42 autocannon
- Secondary armament: Toophan
- Engine: Diesel
- Suspension: Torsion bar

The Tosan (sometimes known as Towsan, meaning "wild horse" or "fury") is an Iranian light tank. Iran calls it a "Quick Reaction" tank because the tank is said to be capable of rapid response and is built for strategic missions.

== History ==
Production started in 1997, but the tank was only produced in small numbers. Colonel Nasser Arab-Beigi, head of the self-sufficiency unit of the IRGC ground forces, announced the mass-production of the Tosan on June 30, 2008, as part of the country's campaign for defense self-sufficiency.

In July 2020, Tosans were deployed to the northwestern borders of Jolfa and Khodaafarin due to escalating tensions between Armenia and Azerbaijan.

== Design ==
The Tosan's design is based on the British FV101 Scorpion; the tank is fitted with a 90 mm gun, Toophan missile launchers (some were mounted), and improved firing and targeting systems. The tank can drive long distances on its tracks and does not need to be carried on trucks.

Iranian sources reported that the Tosan's front armor is armored against bullets up to 12.7 caliber. It is equipped with a diesel engine.

== Variants ==
- Sayyad - lightweight version of Tosan designed as a "quick reaction" vehicle
- "Tosan 30" - variant armed with 30 mm Shipunov 2A42 autocannon

== Operators ==
- Iran: Used by the Iranian Army and the Islamic Revolutionary Guard Corps.
