= Taher sniper rifle =

Iranian sniper rifle

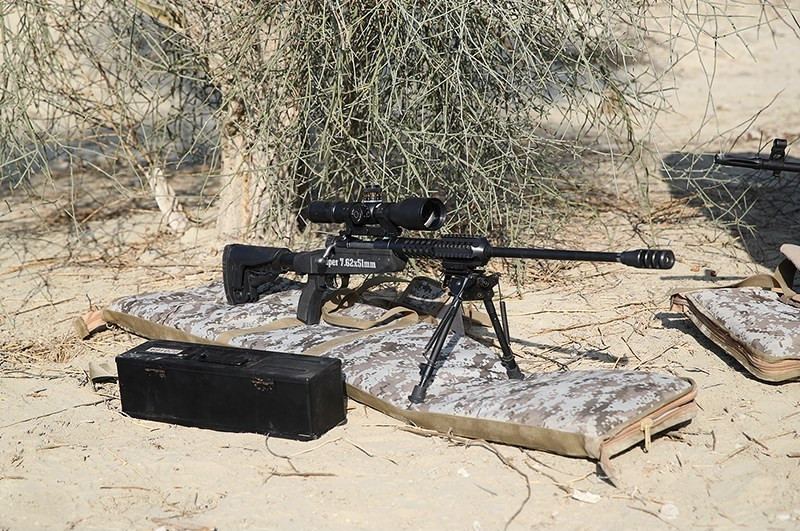

The Taher is a sniper rifle developed by Iran chambered in 7.62x51mm NATO. It was revealed during the country's Muhammad Rasulullah-4 military exercises held 11–13 December 2016. Iran announced that the weapon has a maximum range of 1,200 meters.
