= Rakhsh Khodro Diesel =

Iranian truck manufacturer

Rakhsh Khodro Diesel(RKD CO)
- Type: Private
- Industry: Automotive
- Founded: 2005
- Headquarters: Tabriz, Iran
- Products: Heavy & light trucks, minibuses, buses
- Website: Rakhshkhodro.com

Rakhsh Khodro co or RKD (Persian: رخش خودرو دیزل) is an Iranian truck manufacturer established in 2005 and located in Tabriz. This company is a strategic partner of Kamaz of Russia, JAC and Jinbei of China, and Maz-Man of Belarus. It produces Kamaz trucks, JAC light trucks and its own designed minibus. Its headquarters is in Tabriz, Iran.
