= Shaher anti-materiel rifle =

Shaher
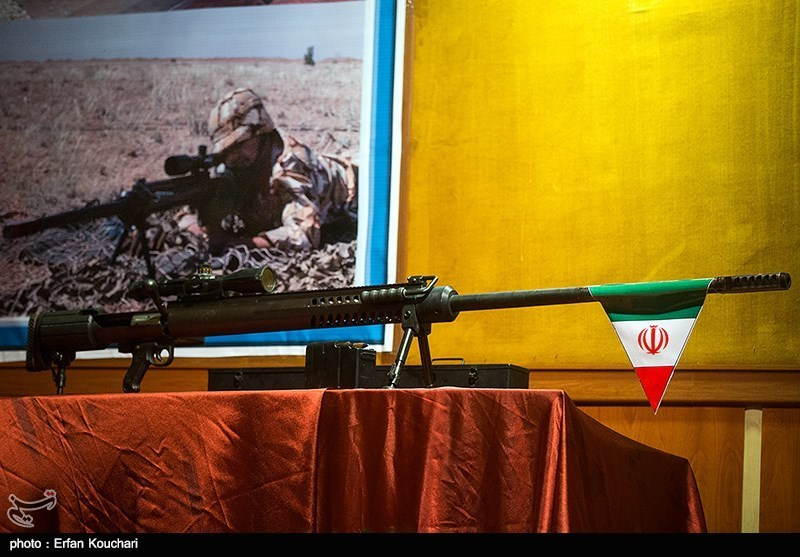
- a Shaher sniper rifle being uveiled in a 2015 ceremony, procuring new military equipment to the Iranian Army.
- Type: Anti-materiel sniper rifle
- Place of origin: Iran

Service history
- In service: 2012–present
- Used by: Iranian Armed Forces

Production history
- Manufacturer: Defense Industries Organization
- Produced: 2012

Specifications
- Mass: 22 kg (49 lbs)
- Length: 1,850 mm (72.8 inches)
- Cartridge: 14.5×114mm
- Caliber: 14.5 mm
- Action: Bolt-action
- Maximum firing range: 4,000 m (13,000 ft)
- Feed system: Single-shot; 4-5 round detachable box magazine

Shaher (Persian: شاهر) is an Iranian-made 14.5mm anti-materiel sniper rifle capable of penetrating concrete strongholds, armored vehicles, and helicopters. It has a maximum effective range of 4 kilometres (2.5 mi). The weapon weighs 22 kilograms (49 lb) and is 1.85 metres (6.1 ft) long. It can engage helicopters and other low-flying aircraft. The anti-armor rounds used by the Shaher are capable of penetrating 50 mm (2.0 in) thick armor and come in different armor-piercing varieties.

== History ==
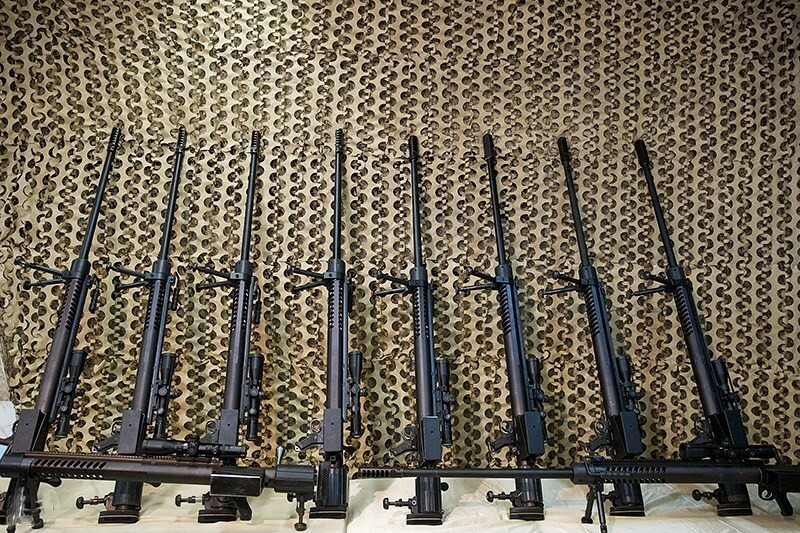
New version of Shaher rifles

The rifle was unveiled in 2012 alongside a series of military vehicles and transportation units. In April 2014, a new version of Shaher was unveiled, featuring a 5 round detachable box magazine and Picatinny rails on the top of the rifle.

It has seen use with Taliban forces during the war in Afghanistan.
