= HM 16 =

Iranian 120mm mortar

HM 16 120 mm Mortar
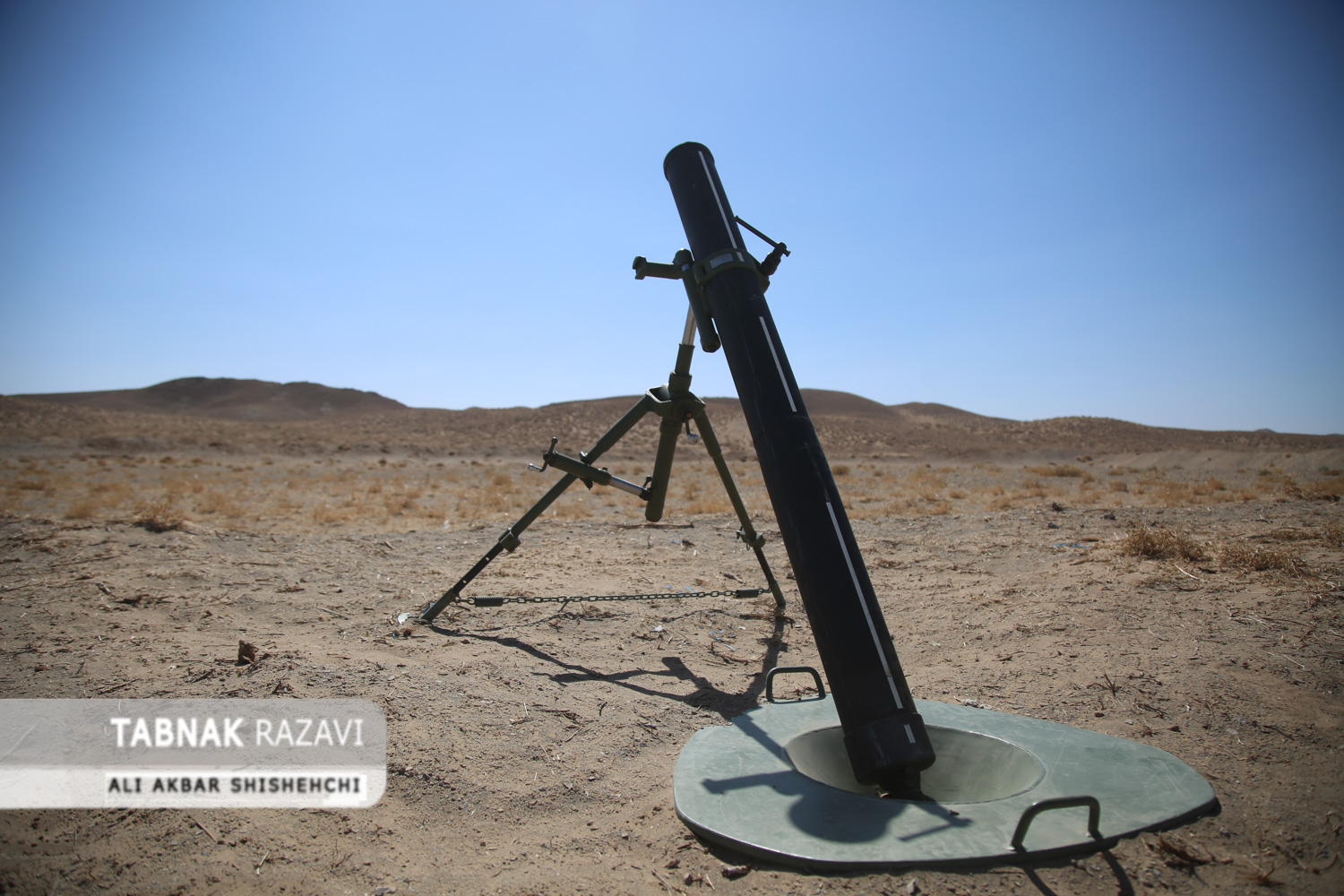
- This image likely shows an HM 16 mortar.
- Type: Mortar
- Place of origin: Iran

Service history
- Used by: See users
- Wars: Sudanese civil war (2023–present)

Production history
- Manufacturer: Defense Industries Organization

Specifications
- Mass: 138.5 kg
- Barrel length: 1726 mm
- Crew: 3
- Caliber: 120 mm
- Elevation: 45° to 85°
- Traverse: 360°
- Rate of fire: 10 rounds per minute
- Maximum firing range: 7200 m

The AMIG HM 16 Hadid is an Iranian mortar. It is manufactured by the Ammunition & Metallurgy Industries Group, part of Iran's Defense Industries Organization. It is a smoothbore and barrel-loading mortar with 360° field of firing and can be taken apart and carried by infantry.

External image
- 120mm HM-16

Under the "Hadid" line, Iran also produces 60 mm and 81 mm mortars.

== Users ==
- Iran
- Sudan
- Syria
- Ukraine — HM 15, HM 16 and HM 19 seized from the Houthis by the United States and donated to Ukraine during the 2022 Russian invasion of Ukraine.
- Russia — HM 16 (OF-843B shells) seized from Ukraine.

=== Non-state users ===
- Hamas
- (Iraq) Popular Mobilization Forces
