= Vafa Mortar =

Iranian mortar

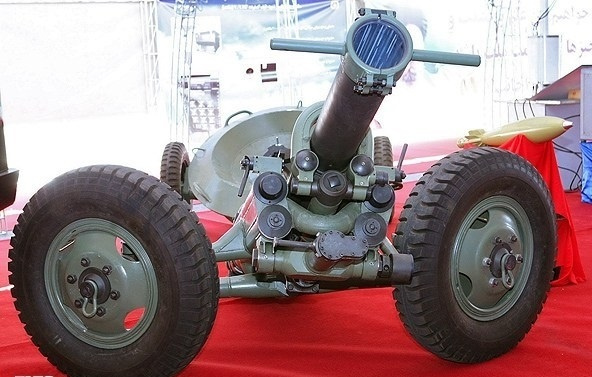
- Place of origin: Iran

Specifications
- Caliber: 160 mm

The Vafa Mortar is a 160 mm mortar manufactured in Iran.

== History ==
The Vafa Mortar was unveiled during a National Defense Industry Day ceremony in Tehran, Iran on August 21, 2012.

== Specifications ==
The Iranian government claims the mortar has a range of 20 kilometres (12 mi). It is a 160 mm mortar. Iranian Defense Minister Ahmad Vahidi claimed the mortar is capable of firing five to eight projectiles per minute.
