= Mobarez (tank) =

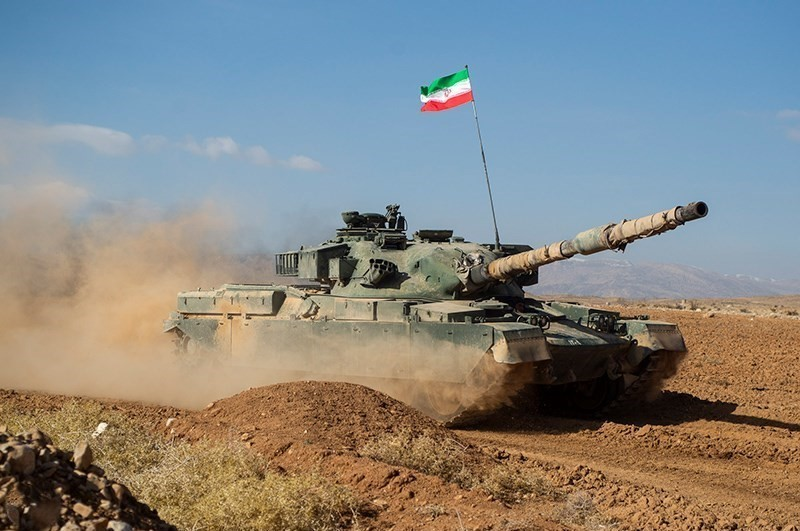
- Mobarez tank during the 2020 army exercise in Siyakh Darengun
- Type: Main battle tank
- Place of origin: Iran

Service history
- Used by: Iran

Production history
- Produced: 2006–present

Specifications (Mobarez)
- Mass: 55 long tons (62 short tons; 56 t)
- Length: 7.5 m (24 ft 7 in) (hull)
- Width: 3.5 m (11 ft 6 in)
- Height: 2.9 m (9 ft 6 in)
- Crew: 4
- Main armament: 120 mm rifled (L11A5)
- Secondary armament: 2 x L7 machine gun
- Engine: diesel 850 hp

Mobarez (Persian: مبارز; meaning "Warrior") is an Iranian domestically upgraded version of the British Chieftain main battle tank (MBT).

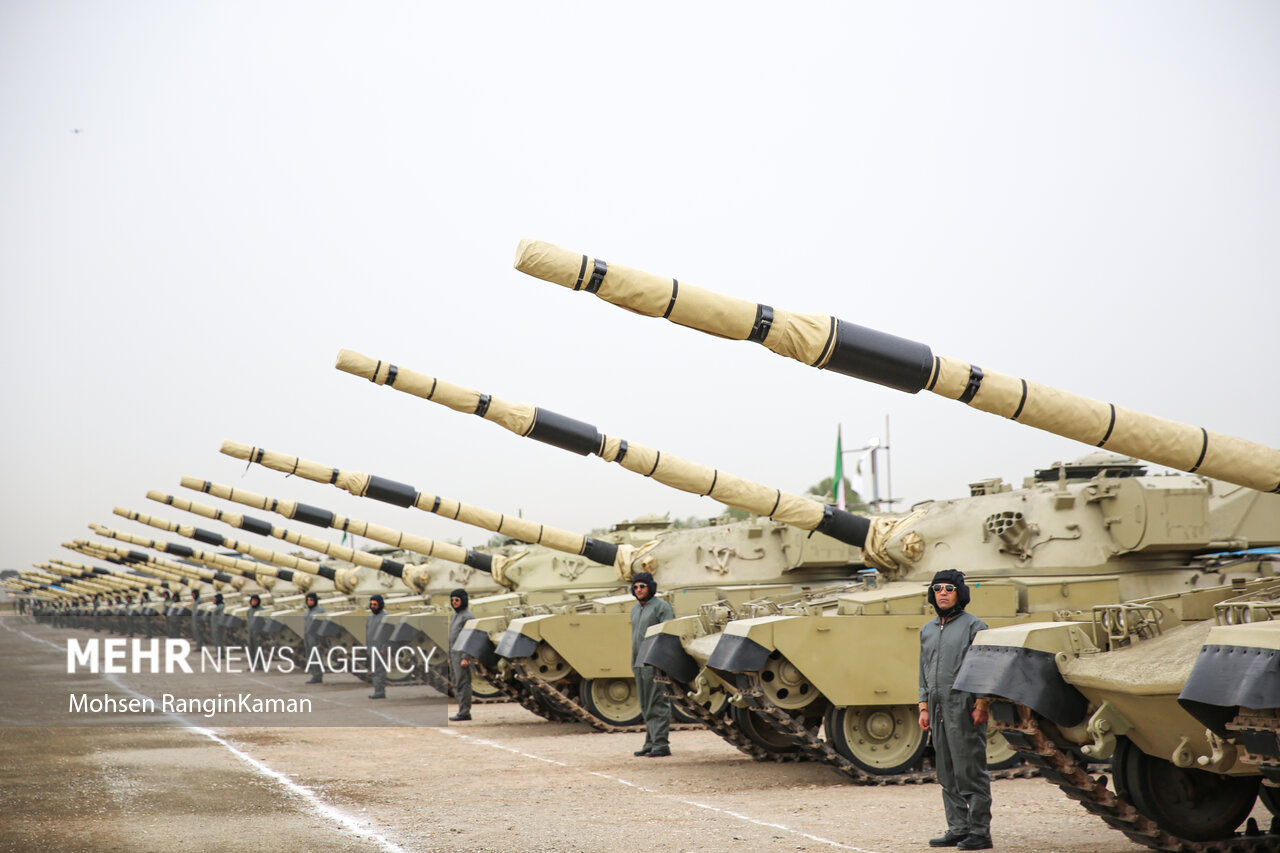
Iranian Army Mobarez Tanks

== Changes ==
The hull of the tank has been modified at the back and sides. The fuel tank has been replaced by a new, repairable one. Also, additional vibration-damping systems have been added to protect sensitive electronic components. Other modifications include a laser range finder, a more powerful engine and the addition of light-amplifying and infra-red systems. The gearbox and suspension were changed, and an electrical generator was also added.

== Production ==
Iran upgrades its Chieftain tanks at the Shahid Kolahduz Industrial Complex along with its T-72 tanks.

== Operators ==
- Iran

== See also ==
- Iranian military industry
