= Toophan =

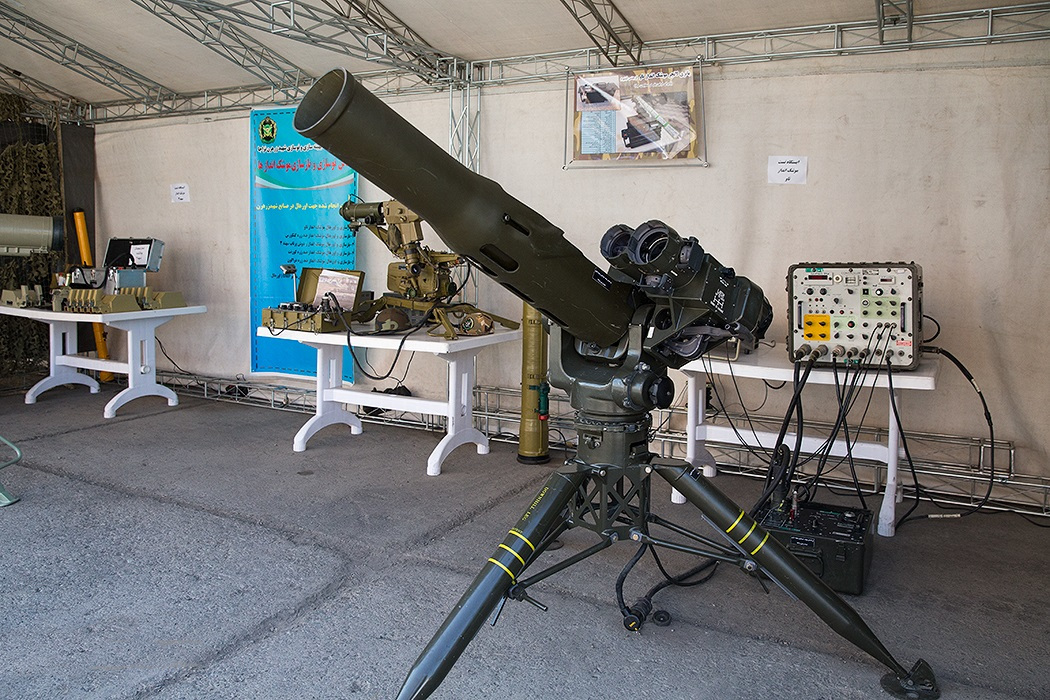
- The Toophan on a tripod.
- Type: Anti-tank missile
- Place of origin: Iran

Service history
- In service: 1987–present
- Wars: Iran–Iraq War; 2006 Lebanon War; Syrian Civil War; War in Iraq (2013–2017); Yemeni Civil War

Production history
- Designer: Hughes Missile Systems
- Designed: Early to mid 1980s
- Manufacturer: Aerospace Industries Organization (missiles, launchers); Iran Electronics Industries (guidance units)
- Produced: 1985–present
- Variants: See Variants

Specifications
- Length: varies based on variant
- Diameter: 0.152 m
- Maximum firing range: 3,500–3,750 m
- Warhead: HE, HEAT, or thermobaric
- Warhead weight: 3.6 kg
- Maximum speed: 310 m/s (peak); 180 m/s (average)
- Guidance system: Wire-guidance. Laser guidance for some variants

The Toophan (Persian: طوفان "typhoon", rarely Toofan) is an Iranian SACLOS anti-tank guided missile reverse-engineered from the American BGM-71 TOW missile. The Toophan 1, an unlicensed copy of the BGM-71A TOW missile, began mass production in 1988 and the Toophan 2, a BGM-71C ITOW variant, was publicly shown in 2000.

The Toophan comes in at least 11 variants, many of which are poorly documented, including variants with laser guidance, thermobaric warheads, and tandem-warheads with increased penetration. The Toophan is manufactured jointly by the Aerospace Industries Organization of Iran and Iran Electronics Industries.

It is normally deployed from ground-based tripods, but can also be mounted on fighting vehicles and helicopters. Like the BGM-71 TOW missile, the Toophan is a large, rugged, powerful, and reliable anti-tank guided missile deployed by small teams against tanks, armored vehicles, buildings, and other targets. The Toophan forms the backbone of the Iranian Armed Forces' ATGM inventory and is procured in large quantities in a variety of variants.

The Toophan has been exported to the governments of Iraq and Syria and to a large number of non-state actors in the Middle East, and has been used in the Iran–Iraq War, the 2006 Lebanon War and the Iraqi, Syrian, and Yemeni Civil Wars.

== Development ==
Iran was among the earliest countries to import the TOW missile, as far back as 1971. Extensive repair and assembly facilities were set up at the Iran Electronics Industries (IEI) by the Texas-based Emerson Energy Systems, as well as Hughes Missile Systems, to repair TOW and FGM-77A Dragon missiles.

In May 1975, negotiations between Iran and Hughes Missile Systems on co-production of TOW and AGM-65 Maverick missiles stalled over disagreements in the pricing structure. Hughes set the royalty and initial investment costs for Iran at $20 million for the TOW and $25 million for the Maverick. The subsequent Iranian Revolution in 1979 ended all plans for such co-production.

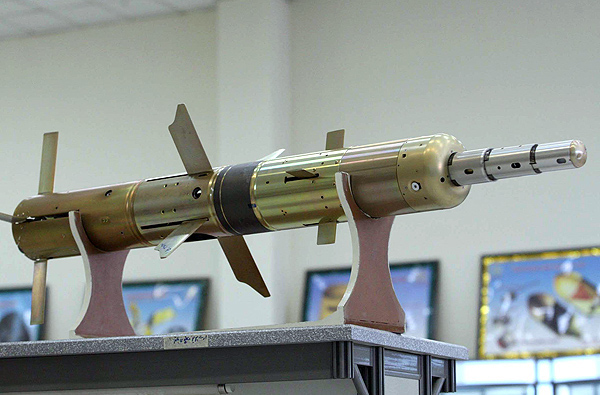
The Toophan 5 is the most advanced variant.

The Iran–Iraq war lead to Iran having an acute need for anti-tank guided missiles to counter Iraq's massive armored formations, leading Iran to import thousands more TOW missiles, as well as Soviet AT-3 Sagger ATGMs. Attempts at local production of both systems began in the first half of the war, with the TOW missile being prioritized due to its better performance. The earliest prototype version was ready in mid-1985, but performance was disappointing compared to Iran's US-made TOW missiles, which received widespread praise in Iran at the time. Following about a year and a half more of R&D work, the Toophan was tested against Iraqi tanks and showed better performance. The missile was shown on an Iranian TV show on March 21, 1987, and production of what would be named the Toophan 1 began by early 1988. R&D and production work continued through the 1990s. The missile was not publicly revealed until 2000, when the Toophan 1 and Toophan 2 were publicly unveiled at the same time. The Toophan has since become Iran's primary anti-tank guided missile.

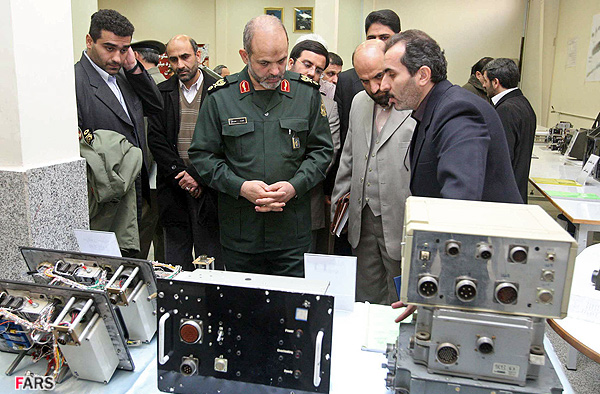
The Toophan's guidance unit is produced by Iran Electronics Industries.

In addition to Toophan missiles, Iran also produces reverse engineered tripod launchers, guidance sets, and storage boxes, all of which bear the Toophan name. Toophan missiles can be fired from TOW launchers, and their components are generally interchangeable. A number of sources say that the Toophan's quality is inferior to that of original American-made TOW missiles, but is still robustly capable.

In 2014 Iran showed a Toophan/TOW simulator they built for helicopter-launched missiles. In a December 2016 military exercise Iran used the missile against naval targets. In 2018 Iran showed off thermal-sights which can be used with the Toophan. The Toophan can be mounted on Boragh APCs, ATVs, or Safir jeeps. Toophan missiles can be repaired by Iran's Shiraz Electronics Industries.

The Toophan was later developed into the Sadid-1, an ambitious project to build a competitor to the Israeli Spike-ER fire-and-forget missile for attack helicopters and drones. The Sadid-1 had limited success, but was used to develop the successful Sadid-345 glide bomb, which in turn spun off a smaller counterpart, the Qaem air-to-ground munition.

In 2018, it's reported that the Toophan can have the RU244TK and RU150TK thermal imaging cameras attached.

== Combat history ==
=== Iran–Iraq War ===
Prototype versions of the Toophan-1 were used in the tail end of the Iran–Iraq War.

=== 2006 Lebanon War ===
Hezbollah received Toophan missiles in the early 2000s and used them against Israeli Merkava tanks and other vehicles during the 2006 Lebanon War.

=== Syrian Civil War ===
The Toophan missile has seen extensive use in the Syrian Civil War. Hezbollah has used Toophan missiles in the war and is one of the missile's most prominent users. The missiles have also been provided to the Syrian Army and Iranian-backed Shiite militias in Syria. Toophan missiles first appeared in Syria reportedly in October 2015. Overall the Toophan missile's use in Syria is poorly documented, but Toophan-1 missiles seem to be the most common. Furthermore, the Kurdish YPG militia has used Toophan 1 missiles as well. The missiles have since proliferated to a wide range of non-state actors operating in Syria. In addition, Toophan missiles have been captured by groups fighting the Syrian government, including ISIS and al-Nusra.

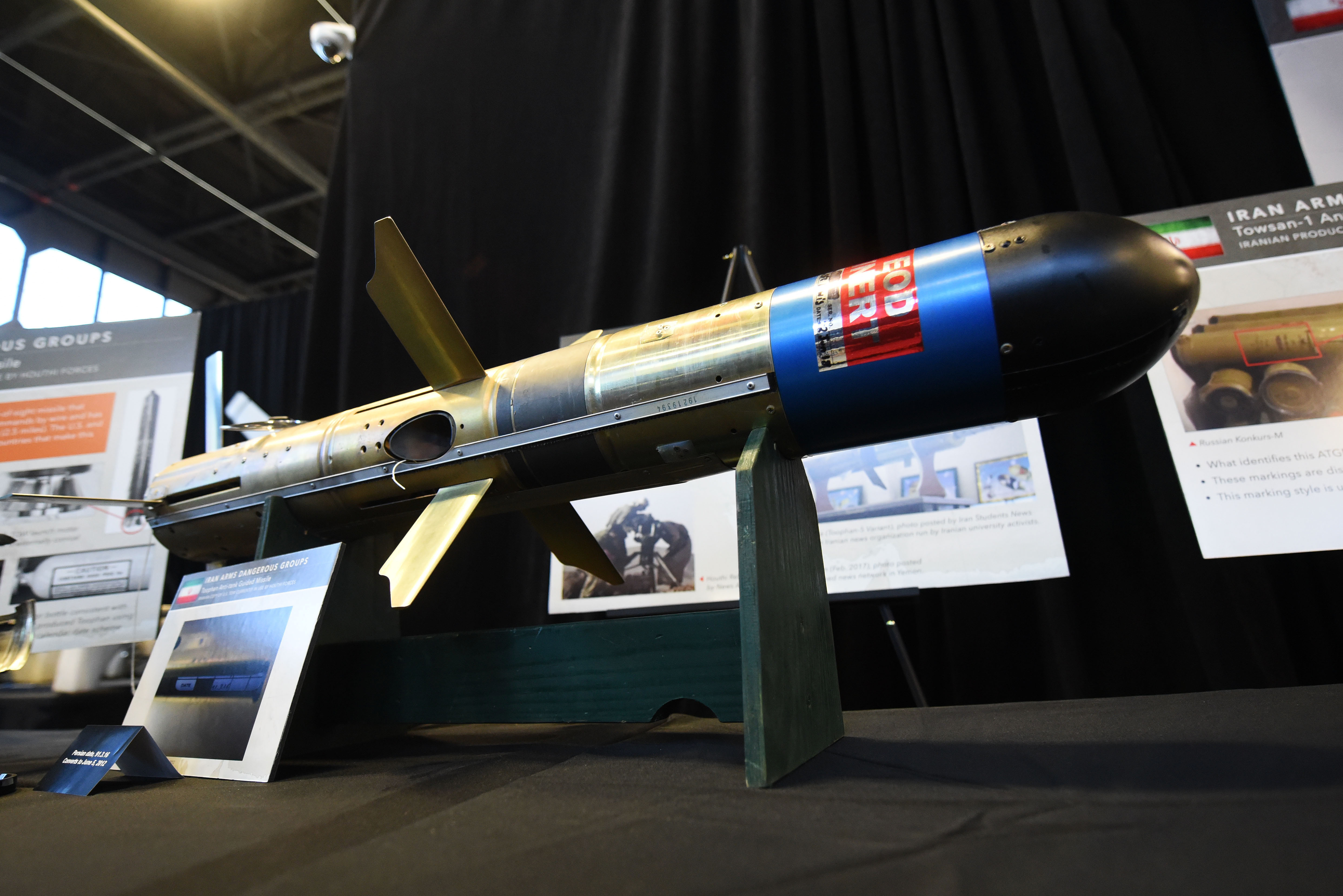
A Toophan missile, unidentified variant, found in Yemen.

=== War in Iraq ===
The first known Iraqi group to receive Toophans was Asaib-Ahl-Al-Haq in 2014. The Badr Organization obtained Toophans in 2015 and the Toophan has since been provided to other Shiite militias organized under the Popular Mobilization Units. Iraq's Federal Police have also been delivered Toophans.

=== Yemen Civil War ===
Iran has shipped Toophan missiles to the Houthis in Yemen as well, where they have been used in combat. The first video of Houthis using a Toophan missile was published in November 2018.

== Identification ==
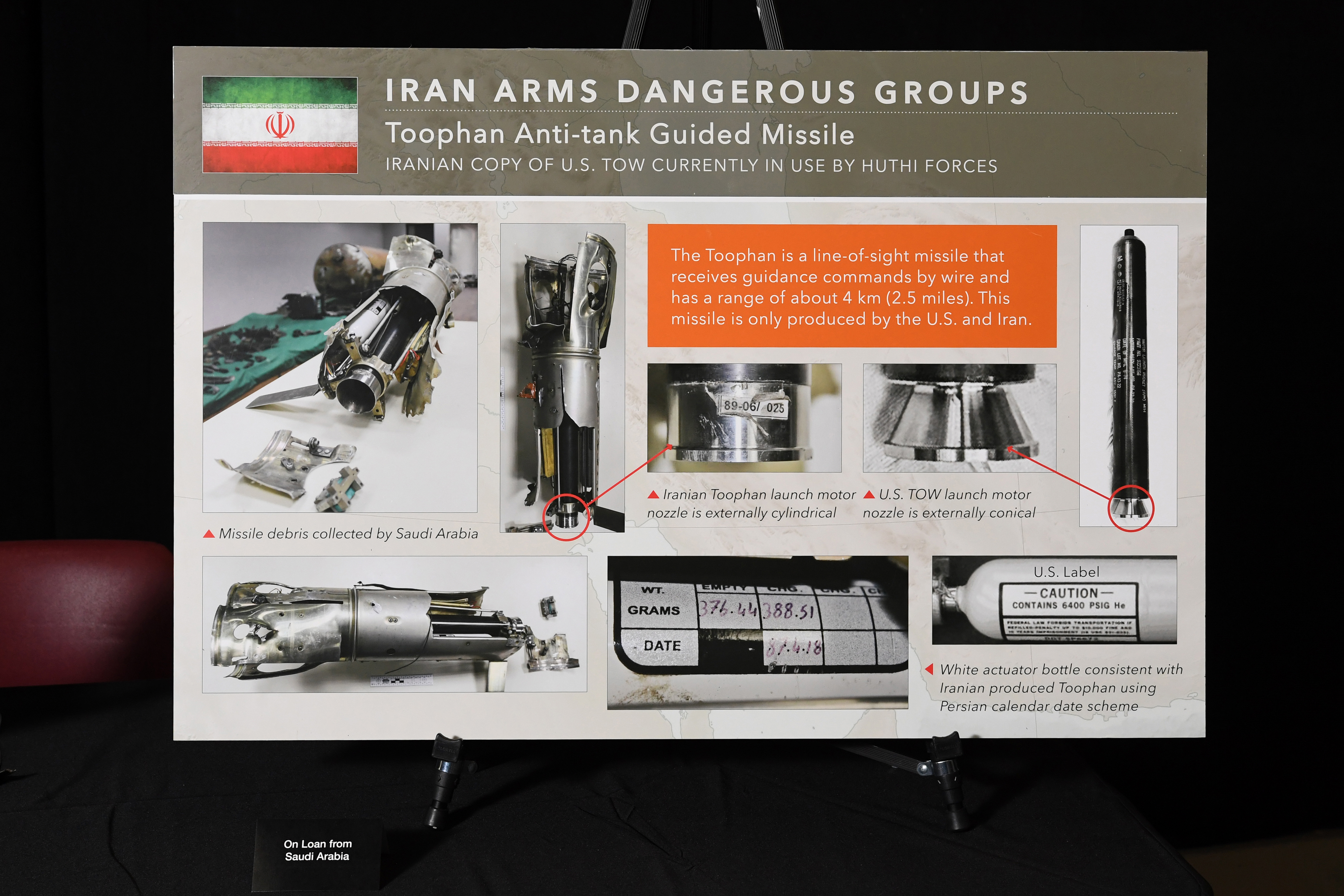
A US DOD sign on Toophan missiles.

Given that the Toophan is reverse-engineered from the US TOW missile, the identification of Toophan missiles versus TOW missiles is difficult. The Toophan ATGM is very similar to the American BGM-71 TOW ATGM from which it is reverse-engineered. Toophan missiles, launchers, control units, and crates are essentially interchangeable with their American counterparts and are regularly mixed together. The many variations of TOW and Toophan missiles also poses challenges.

Toophan missiles can often be identified by their turquoise bands installed by Iran's Defense Industries Organization or by a faint black band on the rear end of the launcher. Toophan missiles, on their packaging, are instead labeled as TOW missiles; for example a Toophan 2M is labeled as a "TOW 2M".

Modern TOW tripods have black rings, while Toophan tripods have yellow rings. Internally, Toophan missiles have different screw placement and cylindrical launch motor nozzles.

== Variants ==
Variant	Range	Penetration (RHA)	Length	Weight	Spec sheet	Notes
Toophan 1	3.5 km	550 mm	116 cm	18.5 kg		BGM-71A TOW clone. The Toophan-1's payload is a 3.6 kg HEAT warhead. The top speed 310 m/s. Exported to Hezbollah of Lebanon in the 2000s and Iraqi forces in the Iraqi Civil War. Toophan-1 marketing material claims a hit probability of 96%. Entered production 1987/1988.
Toophan 2	3.5 km	760 mm	145 cm	19.1 kg		Derivative of BGM-71C TOW missile with a tandem HEAT warhead; possibly incorporates elements of BGM-71E TOW 2A missile. Revealed in 2000.
Toophan 2B	3.5 km	900 mm	145 cm	19.1 kg		Upgraded Toophan 2 with heavier warhead. Exported to Iraq and used in the Battle of Mosul.
Toophan 2M	3.75 km	650 mm	147 cm	21 kg		Tandem warhead. Exported to Iraq.
Toophan 3	3.5 km	80 mm	116 cm	19.1 kg		Derivative of American BGM-71F TOW 2B top-attack missile albeit with worse performance, introduced c. 2016. Possibly exported to Hezbollah (Lebanon) and Kata'ib Hezbollah.
Toophan 3M						Toophan 3 derivative with unknown changes. Top attack ATGM. Revealed in 2019.
Toophan 4	3.75 km	N/A	117.2 cm	20 kg	(in Arabic)	Variant with thermobaric fuel-air warhead. Exported to PMU forces in Iraq and used in the battle of Mosul. Also exported to Houthis in Yemen. First shown to the public in 2017 but in use since at least 2015. Like all Iranian thermobaric weapons, has a distinctive red band.
Toophan 5	3.5 km	900 mm	145 cm	19.1 kg	(in Arabic)	Considered the premier Toophan variant, the Toophan-5 has laser guidance, tandem-warhead and canards. Was apparently in development in 2002 and entered production in 2010. Exported to Iraq and used by Iraqi forces in Ninawa province and elsewhere. As a laser-riding missile, it requires a different launcher. Not a copy of any TOW variant.
Qaem						Anti-helicopter variant with laser guidance and secondary flight motor. Mass production began in 2010.
Qaem-M (or Ghaem-M)	6 km	N/A	116 cm	19.5 kg		Qaem variant with proximity fuze.
Toophan 6	3.5 km	N/A	117.2 cm	21 kg		Anti-bunker thermobaric warhead. First shown to the public in 2017. Perhaps laser-riding. Unclear differences compared to Toophan-4.
Toophan 7	3.75 km		117.2 cm	21 kg	(in Arabic)	Unclear warhead, perhaps fragmentation thermobaric.

== Operators ==
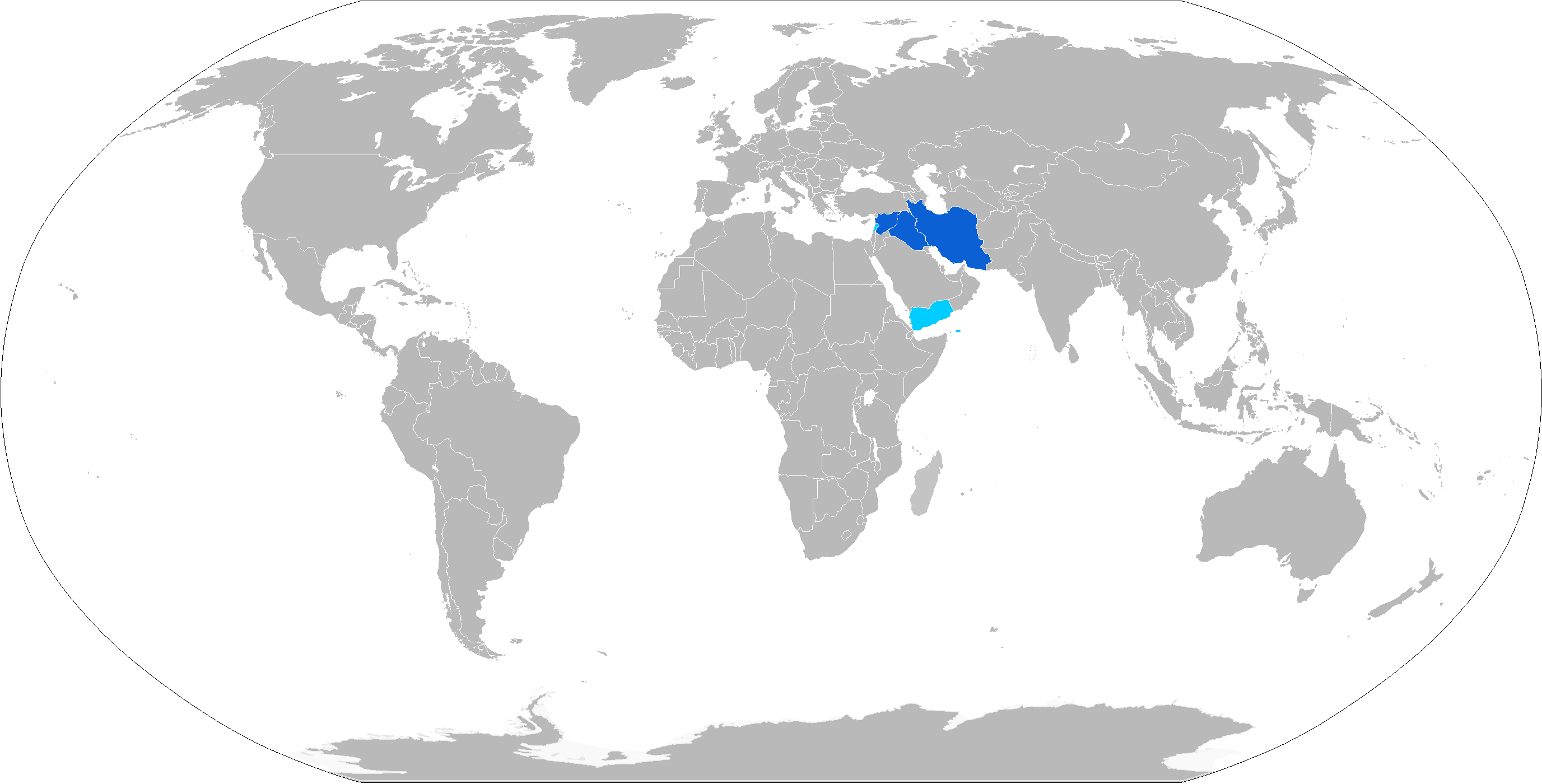
Map with Toophan operators in blue and non-government operators in light blue

- Iran
  - Islamic Revolutionary Guard Corps
  - Iranian Army
    - Ground Forces
- Syria
  - Syrian Arab Army
  - YPG
- Iraq
  - Popular Mobilization Units
- Yemen
  - Houthis
- Lebanon
  - Hezbollah
