= Defense Industries Organization =

Iranian defence company

- Native name: Persian: سازمان صنایع دفاع جمهوری اسلامی ایران; Sâzmân-e Sanâye'-e Defâ'-e Jomhuri-ye Eslâmi-ye Iran
- Type: State-owned company
- Industry: Defense
- Founded: 1981; 45 years ago
- Headquarters: Tehran, Iran
- Area served: Iran
- Products: Munitions; Small arms Artillery; Explosive; Combat vehicle Naval vessels Civil and military aerospace Defence electronics
- Owner: Ministry of Defense (100%)
- Number of employees: >35,000

The Defense Industries Organization (DIO) is a conglomerate of companies run by the Islamic Republic of Iran whose function is to provide the Armed Forces with the necessary manufacturing capacity and technical abilities. In recent years, the DIO has attempted to become export-oriented, allowing Iran to become an exporter of weapons.

== History ==
Flag of the Defense Industries Organization

Prior to 1963, the Iranian military industry consisted of a number of independent factories. Iran's military industry was born under the last Shah of Iran, Mohammad Reza Pahlavi. In 1973, the Iran Electronics Industries (IEI) was founded to organize efforts to assemble and repair foreign-delivered weapons. Most of Iran's weapons before the Islamic revolution were imported from the United States and Europe. Between 1971 and 1975, the Shah went on a buying spree, ordering $8 billion in weapons from the United States alone. This alarmed many in the U.S., which strengthened a 1968 law on arms exports in 1976 and renamed it the Arms Export Control Act. Still, the United States continued to sell large amounts of weapons to Iran until the 1979 Islamic Revolution.

In an early effort to overhaul Iran's military capabilities, Mohammad Reza Shah ordered the creation of the Military Industries Organization (MIO). Operating as a branch of the Ministry of War, the MIO was to oversee all military production within Iran. Over the next fifteen years, military plants produced small arms ammunition, batteries, tires, copper products, explosives, and mortar rounds and fuses. They also produced rifles and machine guns under license from West Germany. In addition, helicopters, jeeps, trucks, and trailers were assembled from imported kits in attempts to transfer technical knowledge to Iran. Additionally, the organization was charged with research and development and took the initiative in reverse engineering a number of Soviet RPG-7, BM-21, and SAM-7 missiles in 1979.

The Iranian Revolution halted all the military activities of the MIO. Plagued by the upheavals of the time, the MIO was left unable to operate without foreign specialists and technicians; by 1981 it had lost much of its management ability and control over its industrial facilities.

The outbreak of the Iran–Iraq War in 1980 and the Western arms embargo served as a massive catalyst for the MIO to reorganize its operations. In late 1981, the new revolutionary government of Iran brought together the now disorganised sections of the MIO and placed them under the Defense Industries Organization. The DIO would from this point onwards supervise all production, research and development.

The Islamic Revolutionary Guard Corps was put in charge of re-organising the domestic military industry. Under their command Iran's military industry was dramatically expanded, and with the Ministry of Defence pouring capital into the missile industry, Iran soon had an arsenal of missiles.

== Operations ==
In 1987, the DIO was governed by a mixed civilian-military board of directors and a managing director responsible for the actual management and planning activities. Although the DIO director was accountable to the deputy minister of defense for logistics, it was the president of Iran, in his capacity as the chairman of the SDC, had ultimate responsibility for all DIO operations.

Since 1992, it also has produced its own tanks, armored personnel carriers, missiles, a submarine, and a fighter plane.

Today, the DIO has more than 35,000 employees, 30% of whom are university graduates. It is also the key organisation driving Iran's significant military industry.

In 2007, following events in Nuclear program of Iran, the United Nations Security Council placed sanctions against Iran forbidding it from exporting any form of weapons.

== Products ==
The products of the Defense Industries Organization have a wide range and even include civilian products, and in total, all military equipment and tools of the armed forces related to this organization. Among the military products of this organization, the following can be mentioned:

- Automatic and semi-automatic weapons
- Missiles
- Drones
- Types of aircraft
- Various floating vessels (frigates, boats and submarines)
- Tanks

== See also ==
- Iran Electronics Industries
- Iran Aviation Industries Organization
