= Longbow (disambiguation) =

A longbow is an archery weapon that uses elasticity to propel arrows.

Longbow may also refer to:

- English longbow, a powerful longbow used by the medieval English and Welsh
- AH-64D Apache Longbow, an attack helicopter
  - AN/APG-78 Longbow, a fire-control radar used by the Apache Longbow
- AGM-114L Longbow Hellfire, an American air and surface-launched missile
- WS-121B Longbow, an American air-to-ground missile project of the 1960s
- Longbow (ALBM), an American air-launched ballistic missile project of the 1970s
- Dakota Longbow T-76, a sniper rifle
- Longbow Games, a computer game company
- Longbow (computer game), a series of combat flight simulator computer games
- Longbow bomber, a fictional spaceship from the Wing Commander series of computer games
- Longbow Motorcar Company, a British electric car company
