= Radioplane BTT =

1940s American target drone

BTT
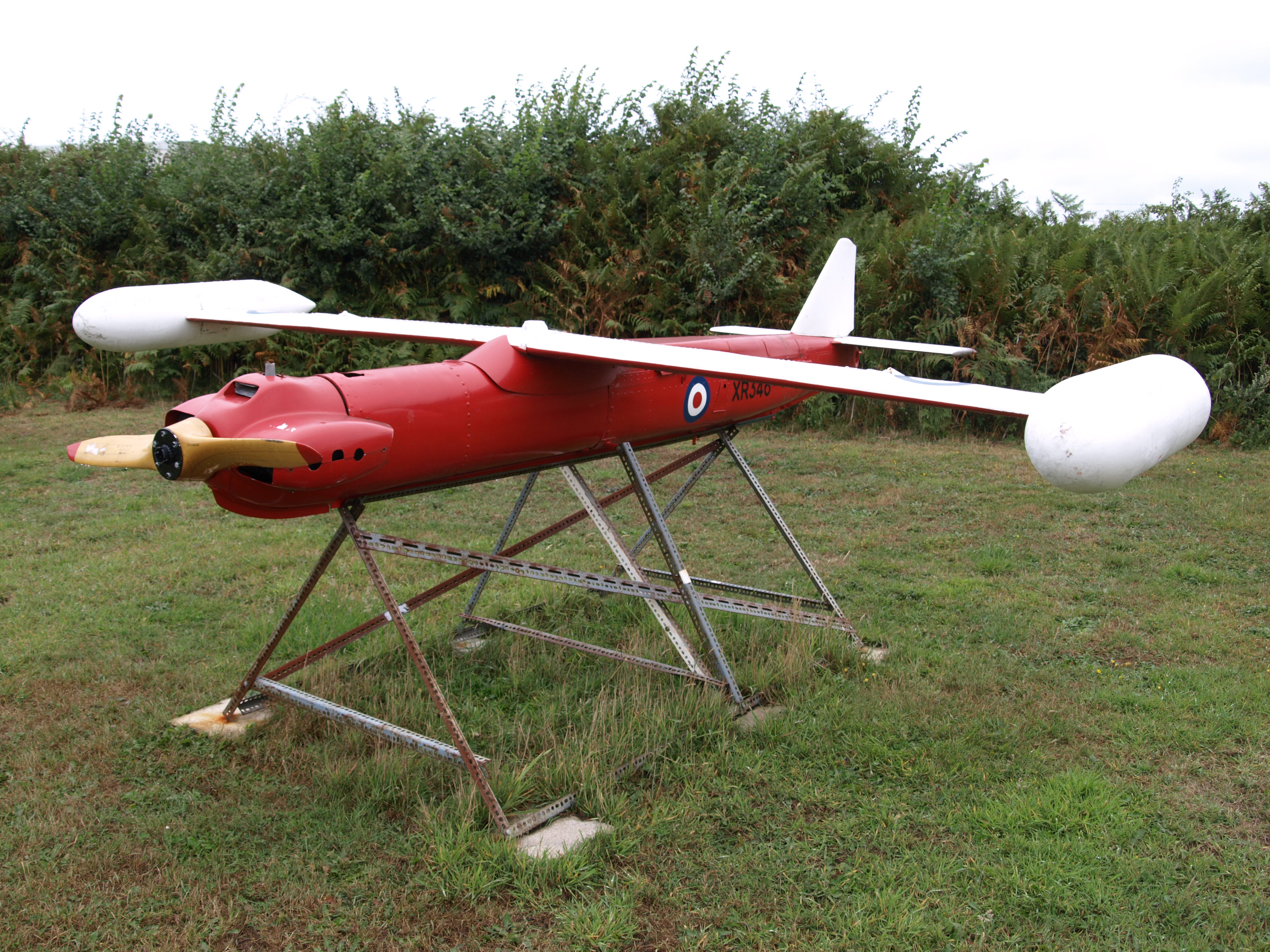
- Radioplane Shelduck on display at the Bournemouth Aviation Museum

General information
- Type: Target drone
- National origin: United States
- Manufacturer: Radioplane, Northrop
- Number built: >73,000

The Radioplane BTT, known as RP-71 by the company, as WS-426/2 by the United States Navy, and as WS-462/2 by the US Air Force, is a family of target drones produced by the Radioplane Company (later a division of Northrop).

== History ==
In the post-World War II period, Radioplane followed up the success of the OQ-2 target drone with another very successful series of piston-powered target drones, what would become known as the Basic Training Target (BTT) family (the BTT designation wasn't created until the 1980s, but is used here as a convenient way to resolve the tangle of designations). The BTTs remained in service for the rest of the 20th century.

== Variants ==
=== OQ-19 / KD2R ===
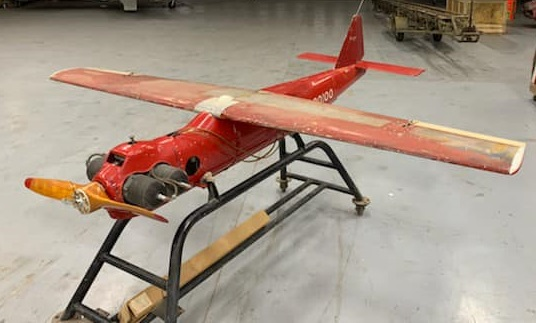
Original OQ-19 on display at Aviation Unmanned Vehicle Museum

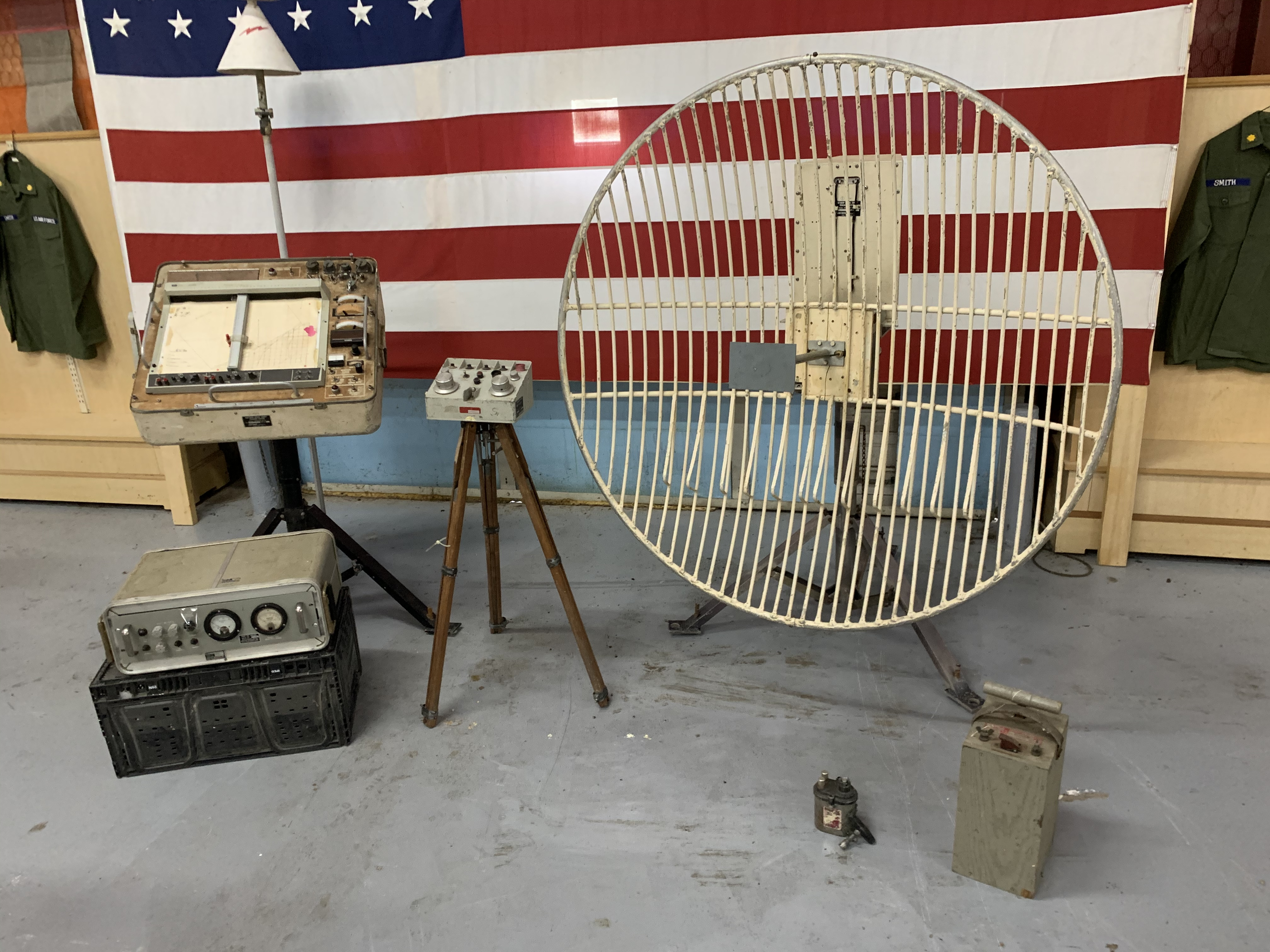
Communications hardware for the BTT on display at the Aviation Unmanned Vehicle Museum

The BTT family began life in the late 1940s, evolving through a series of refinements with the US Army designations of OQ-19A through OQ-19D, and the US Navy name of Quail with designated KD2R. Early models had a metal fuselage and wooden wings, but production standardized on an all-metal aircraft.

Radioplane developed an experimental XQ-10 variant that was mostly made of plastic, but although evaluations went well, it wasn't considered a major improvement over existing technology, and it did not go into production.

Radioplane was bought out by Northrop in 1952 to become the Northrop Ventura Division, though it appears that the "Radioplane" name lingered on for a while.

=== MQM-33 / MQM-36 ===
In 1963, when the US military adopted a standardized designation system, the surviving US Army BTT variants became MQM-33s and the KD2R-1, the only member of the family still in Navy service, became the MQM-36 Shelduck.

The MQM-36 was the most evolved of the BTT family, but retained the same general configuration as the other members. It was larger and more sophisticated than the first-generation OQ-2A series, and was powered by a more powerful flat-four four-stroke McCulloch piston engine with 72 hp (54 kW). The MQM-36 carried Luneburg lens radar enhancement devices in its wingtips that generated a radar signature of a larger aircraft. The radar reflectors (Luneburg lens) wasn't used by the US Navy as the air search radar interfered with the control signals. Thus the air search radar was not used.

Launch was by RATO booster or bungee catapult, and recovery by parachute.

=== MQM-57 Falconer ===
A variant of the BTT designated the RP-71, also known as the SD-1 Observer and later redesignated MQM-57 Falconer, was built for battlefield reconnaissance, with first flight in 1955. The Falconer was similar in appearance to the Shelduck, but had a slightly longer and stockier fuselage. It had an autopilot system with radio-control backup, and could carry cameras, as well as illumination flares for night reconnaissance. Equipment was loaded through a hump in the back between the wings. Although it only had an endurance of a little more than a half-hour, making it of limited use, about 1,500 Falconers were built and the type was used internationally with several different military forces, remaining in service into the 1970s.

Over 76,000 BTT targets were built in all – more than any other type of aircraft – and the type was used by at least 18 nations.

== Operators ==
Australia

- Royal Australian Navy

Belgium

- Belgian Army

Canada

- Royal Canadian Air Force

Mexico
Sweden
United Kingdom

- British Army
- Royal Navy

United States

- United States Army
- United States Navy

== Surviving aircraft ==
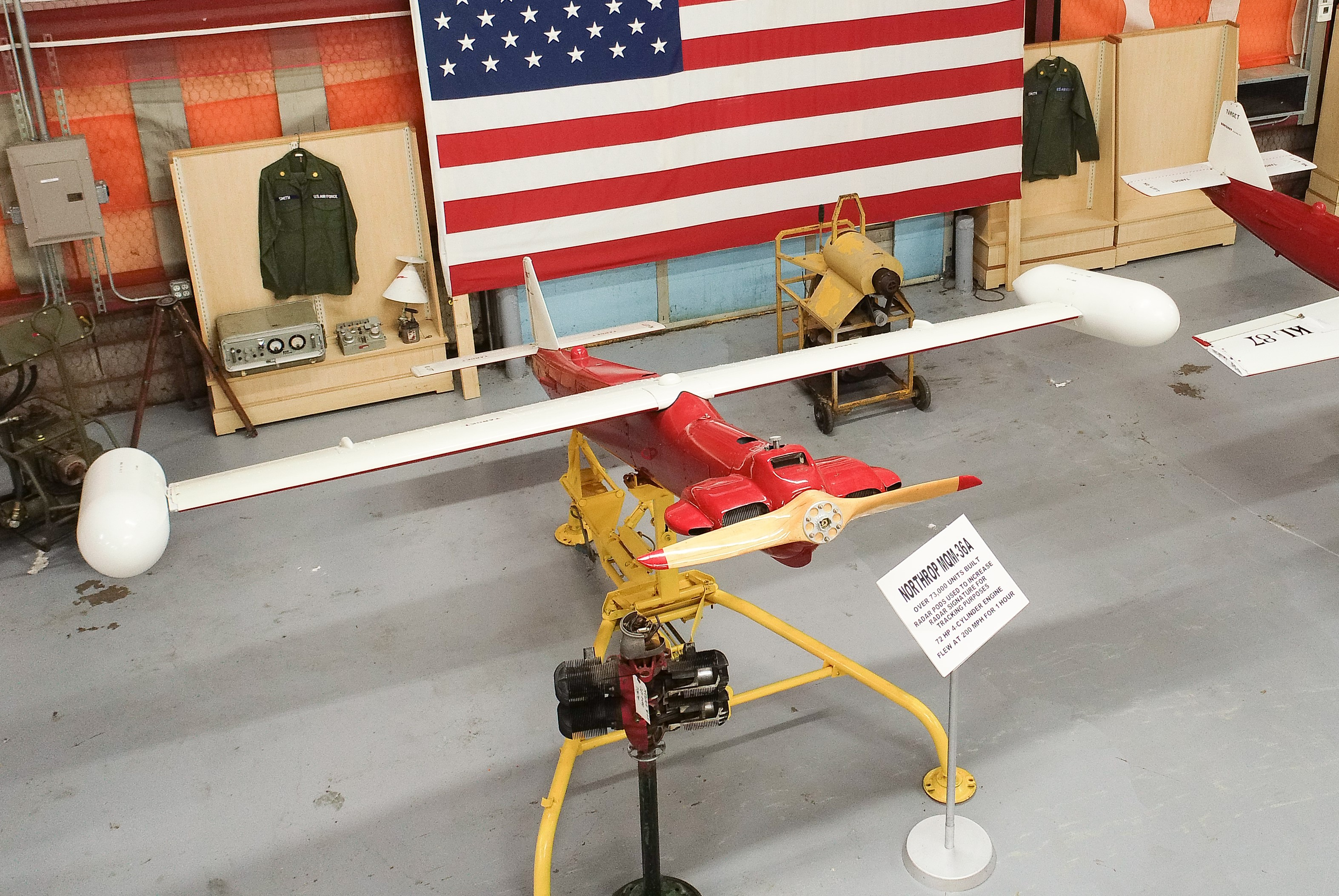
KD2R on display at the Aviation Unmanned Vehicle Museum

Australia

- N10-53152 – KD2R-5 on display at the South Australian Aviation Museum in Port Adelaide, South Australia.

Canada

- MQM-33 on display at the Canadian Museum of Flight in Langley, British Columbia.

Mexico

- MQM-36 on display at the Mexican Air Force Museum in Felipe Ángeles International Airport.

Netherlands

- KL-110 – KD2R-5 on display at the Nationaal Militair Museum in Soesterberg, Utrecht.

Sweden

- KD2R-5 on display at the Arboga Missile Museum.
- On display at the Kolmårdens Djurpark outside of Norrköping, Östergötland.

United Kingdom

- XR346/XV383/XW578 – D.1 on display at the Bournemouth Aviation Museum in Hurn, Dorset.
- XT581 – SD-1 on display at the Imperial War Museum Duxford in Duxford, Cambridgeshire. It was given to the museum in 1978 by the British Army and was restored in the 1990s.

United States

- KD2R on display at the Aviation Unmanned Vehicle Museum in Caddo Mills, Texas. It includes the complete communications hardware.
- KD2R-5 on display at the Western Museum of Flight in Torrance, California.
- MQM-33 on display at the Estrella Warbirds Museum in Paso Robles, California.
- MQM-33 on display at the U.S. Veterans Memorial Museum in Huntsville, Alabama.
- MQM-57 on display at the National Museum of the United States Air Force in Dayton, Ohio.
- OQ-19 fuselage in storage at the National Air and Space Museum in Washington, D.C.
- OQ-19 on display at the National Model Airplane Museum in Muncie, Indiana.
- OQ-19A on display at the Air Victory Museum in Lumberton, New Jersey.
- OQ-19B on display at the Alaska Aviation Museum in Anchorage, Alaska.
- OQ-19D on display at the National Museum of the United States Air Force in Dayton, Ohio.
- OQ-19D on display at the Alaska Veterans Museum in Anchorage, Alaska.
- OQ-19D on display at the Pima Air & Space Museum in Tucson, Arizona.
- OQ-19D on display at the Minnesota Wing of the Commemorative Air Force in South St. Paul, Minnesota.
- OQ-19D on display at the Greater Saint Louis Air & Space Museum in Cahokia Heights, Illinois.

== Specifications (MQM-36) ==

Data from Jane's All The World's Aircraft 1966–67.

General characteristics

- Crew: None
- Length: 13 ft 7 in (4.14 m)
- Wingspan: 11 ft 6 in (3.50 m)
- Height: 2 ft 7 in (0.79 m)
- Wing area: 18.72 sq ft (1.74 m^{2})
- Aspect ratio: 7.0:1
- Empty weight: 273 lb (124 kg)
- Gross weight: 403 lb (183 kg)
- Powerplant: 1 × McCulloch O-100-2 , 72 hp (53 kW)

Performance

- Maximum speed: 202 mph (324 km/h, 176 kn)
- Stall speed: 67 mph (108 km/h, 58 kn)
- Range: 207 mi (333 km, 180 nmi)
- Endurance: 1 hours
- Service ceiling: 23,000 ft (7,000 m)
- Rate of climb: 3,500 ft/min (17.8 m/s)
