= Radioplane XKD4R =

1950s American target drone

XKD4R
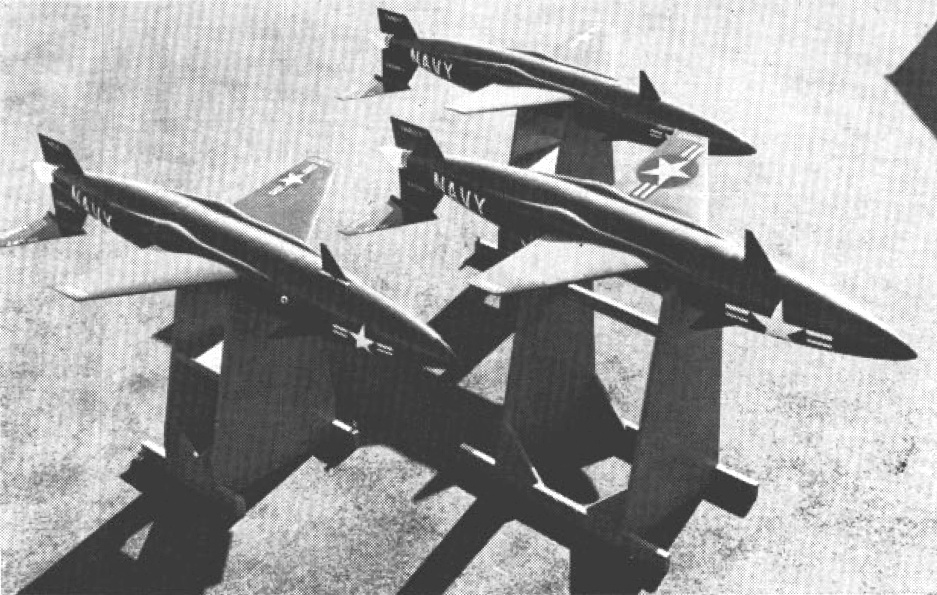

General information
- Type: Target drone
- National origin: United States
- Manufacturer: Radioplane
- Primary user: United States Navy

History
- First flight: January 1958
- Developed into: AQM-38

The Radioplane XKD4R, known by the company designation RP-70, was an American target drone developed by the Radioplane Division of the Northrop Corporation. Although it was not produced in quantity, it was developed into the successful AQM-38.

== Design and development ==
The XKD4R was an air-launched target drone, powered by a single Aerojet solid-fuel rocket engine which exhausted through nozzles located at the trailing edges of the wing. Constructed largely of molded plastic, it utilized an unconventional control configuration, consisting of three canard control fins located forwards, one on top of and one on either side of the fuselage, and fixed horizontal fins at the rear. An autopilot controlled the drone after launch; at the end of an approximately nine-minute flight, a parachute was deployed for recovery.

== Operational history ==
Conducting its first flight in January 1958, the XKD4R-1 was tested extensively by the United States Navy, launches usually being conducted from McDonnell F3H Demon fighters. Although satisfactory, the RP-70 was not produced; instead, the improved RP-76 was developed, flying in 1959 and being produced for both the U.S. Air Force and Navy, becoming the AQM-38 in 1962.

== Specifications (XKD4R-1) ==
Data from Parsch

General characteristics

- Crew: None
- Length: 9 ft 6 in (2.90 m)
- Wingspan: 5 ft (1.5 m)
- Gross weight: 305 lb (138 kg)
- Powerplant: 1 × Aerojet 530NS35 solid-fuel rocket, 37 lbf (0.16 kN) thrust burn time 530 sec

Performance

- Maximum speed: Mach Mach 0.95
- Endurance: 9 minutes
- Service ceiling: 60,000 ft (18,000 m)

== See also ==
Related development

- Northrop AQM-38

Aircraft of comparable role, configuration, and era

- Temco XKDT Teal

Related lists

- List of unmanned aerial vehicles
