= Dale Weejet 800 =

General information
- Type: Light Jet
- National origin: United States of America
- Manufacturer: Dale-Air Engineering, Carma Mfg. Inc.
- Designer: Harold Dale, Eleanor Dale
- Number built: 1

History
- First flight: 30 March 1956

The Dale Weejet 800, or Weejet VT-1 was an early light jet intended for high-speed personal transport or primary military training.

== Design and development ==
Harold Dale, an engineer at North American Aviation who had designed several homebuilt aircraft, teamed up with Edward Gagnier, a former North American engineer, to develop the Weejet. The name was registered in February 1952 and the prototype was built in 2 1/2 years.

The Weejet was a two-seat side-by-side, mid-winged all-aluminum, retractable tricycle gear aircraft with a V-tail arrangement. The aircraft was powered by a 920lb thrust Continental-Turbomeca Marbore II J-69-T-15 engine. Air was fed to the engine through two triangular inlets mounted on the inboard wing roots. Fuel was carried in the leading edge of the wings, and tip tanks. The aircraft had oxygen tanks and was pressurized to 3 psi differential pressure. The seats were designed to accommodate parachutes. The rudder pedals were adjustable for different pilot heights.

== Operational history ==
The first test flight was conducted by Harold Dale on 30 March 1956. The aircraft completed several spin tests, but during one test the canopy opened and the aircraft went into an inverted spin. The pilot bailed out safely and the prototype crashed after performing an unmanned inverted loop. It was later found that the trim tab was set to full nose-down attitude during the test. A scheduled demonstration of the aircraft for the U.S. Navy was canceled. No other Weejets were produced.

== Specifications (Dale Weejet 800) ==
Data from Sport Aviation and Jane's All The World's Aircraft 1957-58

General characteristics

- Capacity: two
- Length: 24 ft 6 in (7.47 m)
- Wingspan: 28 ft (8.5 m)
- Height: 6 ft 8 in (2.03 m)
- Wing area: 150 sq ft (14 m^{2}) swept
- Airfoil: NACA 23012
- Empty weight: 2,481 lb (1,125 kg)
- Gross weight: 3,826 lb (1,735 kg)
- Fuel capacity: 132 U.S. gallons (500 L; 110 imp gal)
- Powerplant: 1 × Continental-Turbomeca Marbore II J-69-T-15 , 920 lbf (4.1 kN) thrust

Performance

- Maximum speed: 290 kn (334 mph, 538 km/h)
- Cruise speed: 246 kn (283 mph, 455 km/h)
- Stall speed: 56.0 kn (64.5 mph, 103.8 km/h)
- Range: 1,248 nmi (1,436 mi, 2,311 km) at 35,000 ft
- Rate of climb: 2,200 ft/min (11 m/s) at sea level
- Wing loading: 25.5 lb/sq ft (125 kg/m^{2})

Avionics

- AN/ARC-27 Comm
- AN/ARA-25 ADF

== See also ==
Aircraft of comparable role, configuration, and era

- Bede BD-5
- CMC Leopard
- Promavia Jet Squalus
- SIPA S.200 Minijet
