= Northrop AQM-38 =

AQM-38
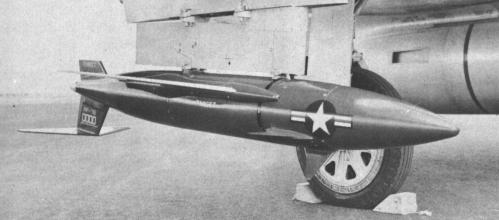
- AQM-38A on F-89 Scorpion launch aircraft
- Type: Target drone
- Place of origin: United States

Service history
- In service: 1959-1970s
- Used by: United States military

Production history
- Manufacturer: Northrop Corporation
- No. built: 2000+

Specifications (AQM-38A)
- Mass: 300 pounds (140 kg)
- Length: 9 feet 8 inches (2.95 m)
- Height: 1 foot 6 inches (0.46 m)
- Diameter: 12 inches (300 mm)
- Wingspan: 5 feet (1.5 m)
- Engine: Aerojet 530NS35; 36 lb_{f} (160 N)
- Propellant: Solid fuel
- Flight ceiling: 60,000 feet (18,000 m)
- Boost time: 9 minutes
- Maximum speed: Mach 0.94
- Launch platform: F-89 Scorpion

The AQM-38 was an American target drone, developed during the 1950s by the Radioplane Division of the Northrop Corporation, Newbury Park, California, and manufactured by its Ventura Division at Van Nuys, California. Extensively used for surface-to-air missile training, over two thousand were built during its production run and it saw continued use within the United States Army and United States Navy for nearly twenty years.

== Design and development ==
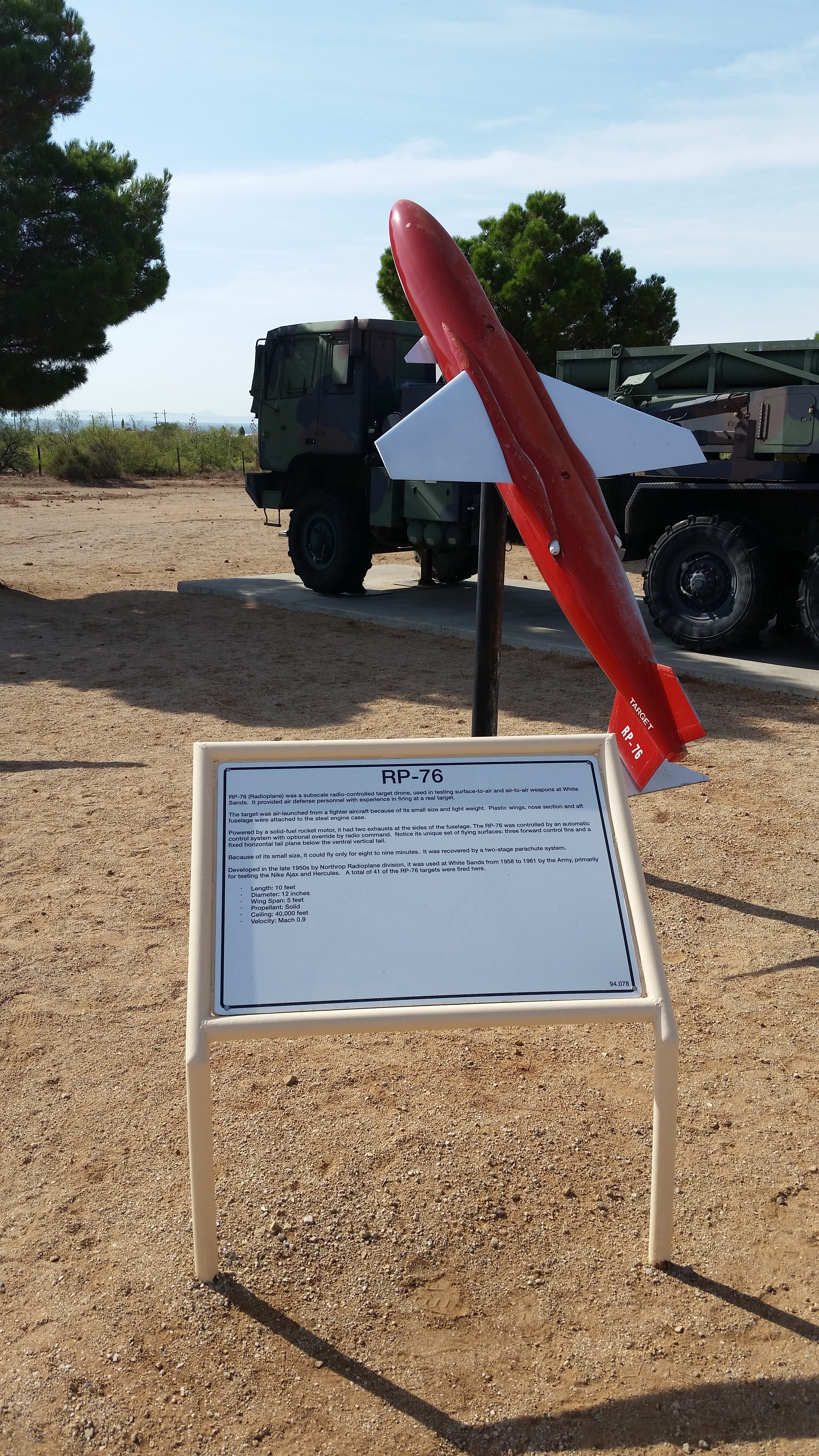
White Sands Missile Range Museum RP-76 display

Following flight trials of the XKD4R target drone, developed for the United States Navy, Radioplane redesigned the aircraft into an improved version, designated RP-76, which first flew in 1959. Compared to the XKD4R, the RP-76 had redesigned wing fairings, with the vertical control fin being moved to the underside of the missile, as opposed to being on top.

The RP-76 was designed to fly a pre-programmed trajectory on autopilot, with radio command guidance being optional. As with the XKD4R, control was provided by three fins located forwards on the body of the craft. A Luneburg lens was included to augment the drone's radar signature, and recovery at the end of the flight was by parachute.

== Operational history ==
Following its first flight in 1959, the RP-76 was most often launched from a F-89 Scorpion fighter of the United States Air Force, and was extensively used by the U.S. Army for training the operators of surface-to-air missiles; it saw additional use in training USAF fighter pilots in air-to-air gunnery, as well.

A slightly modified version, designated RP-78, was supplied to the U.S. Navy; it used a more powerful rocket, producing 99,000 lb_{f} (440 kN) of thrust, to propel the drone to a top speed of Mach 1.25.

In 1963, the RP-76 and RP-78 received the designations AQM-38A and AQM-38, respectively, in the new "tri-service" missile designation system. In all, over 2,000 examples of the drone were built by Northrop, with the missile remaining in service with the U.S. Military until they were retired in the mid-1970s.

== See also ==
- List of missiles
