= XQ =

XQ, X.Q., or Xq can refer to:

- SunExpress, a Turkish airline (IATA code XQ)
- XQ, a model of Daewoo Royale car
- XQ-1, a variant of Radioplane Q-1 drone aircraft
