= Radioplane Company =

Aviation company in the US

Radioplane Company logo, c. 1939

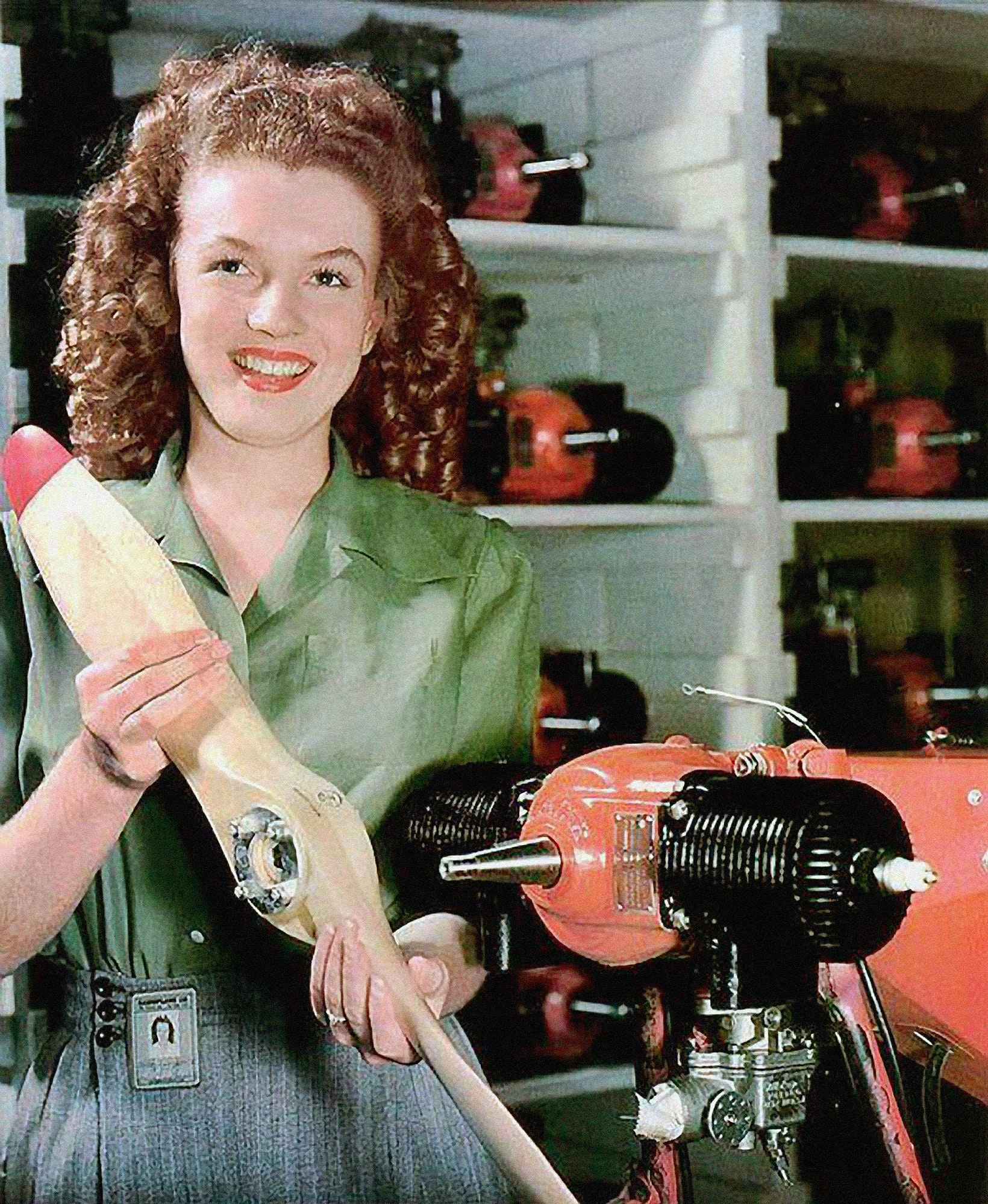
Norma Jeane Dougherty, later known as Marilyn Monroe, was discovered while working at the Radioplane factory in 1944. The drone is the OQ-3.

The Radioplane Company was an American aviation company that produced drone aircraft primarily for use as gunnery targets. During World War II, they produced over 9,400 of their Radioplane OQ-3 model, a propeller-powered monoplane, making it the most-used target aircraft in the US. In the post-World War II era they introduced their Radioplane BTT series, which was produced for years and eventually reached almost 60,000 examples. They also produced several radio control and self-guided missiles, the largest being the GAM-67 Crossbow, which did not enter service. The company was purchased by Northrop Corporation in 1952, and moved to one of Northrop's factories in 1962. One of the last projects carried out at the original Radioplane factory in Van Nuys, California, was the construction of the Gemini Paraglider.

== History ==
=== Reginald Denny Hobby Shops ===
Reginald Denny served with the Royal Flying Corps during World War I, and after the war emigrated to the United States to seek his fortunes in Hollywood as an actor. He was successful as a supporting actor in dozens of films and made a good living. Like many actors of the era, he took up flying for sport in the 1920s. But he then lost almost all of his money speculating in oil and mining stocks.

Between films, Denny overheard a racket next door and went to investigate. He found the neighbor's son attempting to start one of the earliest radio-control model airplanes. Denny attempted to help, but they instead ended up destroying the model. While attempting to get it fixed, Denny became acquainted with the newly forming model industry, one of whom convinced him to take it up as a hobby. In 1934 he started a small hobby shop with a partner on Hollywood Boulevard, but after two years it went out of business.

=== Reginald Denny Industries ===
Denny approached (or was approached by) Nelson Paul Whittier, grandson of Quaker pioneer John Greenleaf Whittier. The two formed Reginald Denny Industries in 1935 to develop a new radio controlled model, and were joined by electronics engineer Kenneth Case. For the next three years they attempted to produce a design known as the Radioplane One, or RP-1, essentially a greatly enlarged model airplane, complete with a fuselage area that included the step where a windscreen was in a real aircraft. The control system was based on a telephone dial: dial 4 for elevator down, and then 2 to stop the motion. Due to the latencies in the system, the aircraft were found to be almost uncontrollable.

In 1936, Denny met General W.S. Thiele at Fort MacArthur in Los Angeles, who complained that it cost $300 to have an aircraft tow a target for gunnery practice. He also noted that the target flew in a straight line, which made it unrealistic. Denny suggested that a radio controlled model might be a more cost-effective solution. In an effort to interest the US Army in the design, they had demonstrated the RP-1 at Dale Dry Lake on 21 February 1938, but the radio failed and it crashed.

In spite of the crash, the Army agreed to purchase three models for $11,000 if they met certain performance requirements. In 1938, they purchased a new aircraft design by Fred Hardy and its associated engine from Walter Righter, who had supplied the engines for their previous designs. They began marketing them as the "Dennyplane" with the "Dennymite" engine. After continued development, they demonstrated the design to the Army in March 1939 as the RP-2, and this was far more successful.

In November, they demonstrated the RP-3, which used welded steel tubing in place of glue-and-screwed balsa wood for the framework, and added the new feature of a parachute that could be activated when the flight was completed, making landings a simple push-button task. Continued testing was carried out at March Field, east of Los Angeles. These early tests were not very successful, but a series of improvements were quickly worked into the design. At this point the Whittier estate withdrew further funding.

=== Radioplane ===
Denny and Whittier sought bankers to provide bridge financing, and one of these put them in touch with Whitney Collins, a vice-president at Menasco Motors Company and budding entrepreneur. Collins and Denny estimated it would take somewhere between $50,000 and $75,000 to bring the RP-3 up to the performance demanded by the original $11,000 contract, but Collins was willing to take a chance that this would lead to future business. Collins and his partner Harold Powell split the drone program off from Reginald Denny Hobby Shops and formed Radioplane with Denny and Whittier. Whittier was later bought out.

Another year of development was required before the new RP-4 design was complete, having been extensively re-designed by aeronautical engineer Ferris Smith. Testing was accomplished by mounting the models to a framework on the front of a Packard Twelve Senior and driving across Muroc Dry Lake at speeds up to 120 miles per hour (190 km/h). Along with significant changes to the aerodynamics, the new design featured side-by-side contra-rotating propellers to counteract engine torque from its Sidewinder engine, and tricycle landing gear. The RP-4 also used a new joystick-based control system that operators found easier to use. Three examples were delivered to the Army, who placed an order for an additional 53 units. (Note: Some sources state the RP-4 was given the Army designation OQ-1, but the US Army Air Force's "Army Aircraft Model Designations" of 1946 does not contain an entry for OQ-1.)

The production models were further modified, known to Radioplane as the RP-5, and to the Army as the Radioplane OQ-2. Delivery of these began in June 1941.

=== Wartime work ===
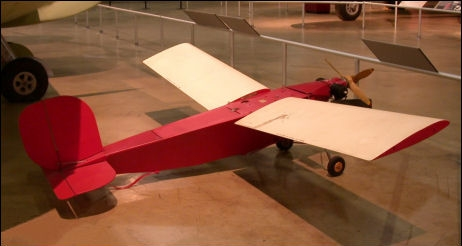
The OQ-2 was the company's first major success. Note the contra-rotating propellers.

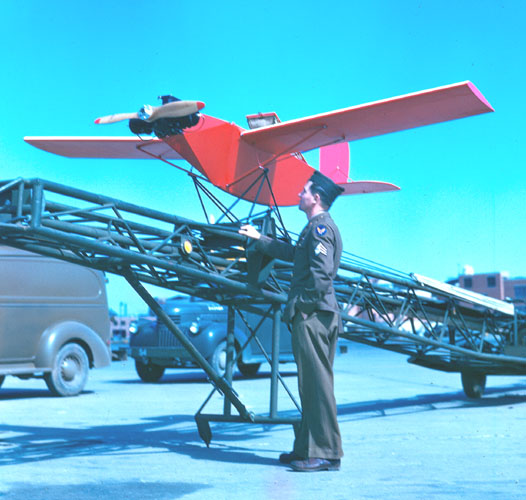
Over 9,400 of the slightly modified OQ-3 were produced.

Orders began to pour in, and the company expanded into the former Timm Aircraft factories on the northeast corner of the Van Nuys Airport in 1942, when Timm moved to the western side. May 1942 brought the updated RP-5A, differing primarily in the 6.3 horsepower (4.7 kW) Righter O-15-1 engine driving in-line propellers instead of side by side, along with tail-dragger landing gear. The Army purchased this as the OQ-2A, which led to the US Navy buying a slightly modified version as the TDD-1, for Target Drone, Denny, 1. Navy models lacked the landing gear, which was useless on water. The OQ-2B had a lightened structure by drilling holes in the wing ribs.

By 1943, there was a demand for a faster version, which led to the December introduction of the OQ-3, or TDD-2. This was essentially a strengthened version of the OQ-2 with a larger 8 horsepower (6.0 kW) O-15-3 engine that allowed it to reach 103 miles per hour (166 km/h). (Note: Some sources say 102 mph, not 103.) It also used a single propeller in place of the OQ-2's counter-rotating variety, as the torque effects were no longer a concern for the operators. The OQ-3/TDD-2 was the most-produced Radioplane drone of the war era, with over 9,400 produced.

It was on the RP-5 assembly line in 1944 that Army photographer David Conover saw a young woman assembler named Norma Jeane Dougherty, whom he thought had potential as a model. She was photographed working on the OQ-3, which led to a screen test for Norma Jeane Dougherty, who soon changed her name to Marilyn Monroe.

In November 1943, the company produced the OQ-7, essentially an OQ-3 with some cleanups and a new mid-mounted, slightly swept wing. This reached 112 miles per hour (180 km/h) but was not taken into production.

A totally new design was introduced in April 1944, the RP-8. This was powered by a new 22 horsepower (16 kW) O-45-1, allowing it to reach 141 miles per hour (227 km/h). This was taken into service as the OQ-14 and TDD-3, and a larger O-45-35 engine was used by the Navy's TDD-4. The RP-10 tested a new low-mounted wing on an otherwise unmodified OQ-7. A new four-cylinder 22 horsepower (16 kW) Righter O-45 powered the RP-14 which reached 168 miles per hour (270 km/h). A 60 horsepower (45 kW) O-60 four-cylinder engine from McCulloch Motors Corporation provided speeds of 195 miles per hour (314 km/h) on two experimental RP-15's (OQ-6A) in November 1944. Combining this engine with a totally new metal-skinned fuselage and wings produced the RP-19, which reached 140 miles per hour (230 km/h). About 5,200 OQ-14/TDD-3's were produced. Adding the more powerful O-45-35 engine produced the OQ-17/TDD-4, but only small numbers were produced.

By the end of the war the company's factory floor had expanded from 979 square feet in 1940 to 69,500 spread over five buildings, and was delivering 50 drones a day. The company, along with production partner Frankfort, ultimately produced nearly fifteen thousand drones during the Second World War. Righter's engine plant remained in Burbank, and was eventually purchased by Radioplane in May 1945.

=== Post-war, Northrop purchase ===
Radioplane Company logo ca. 1952

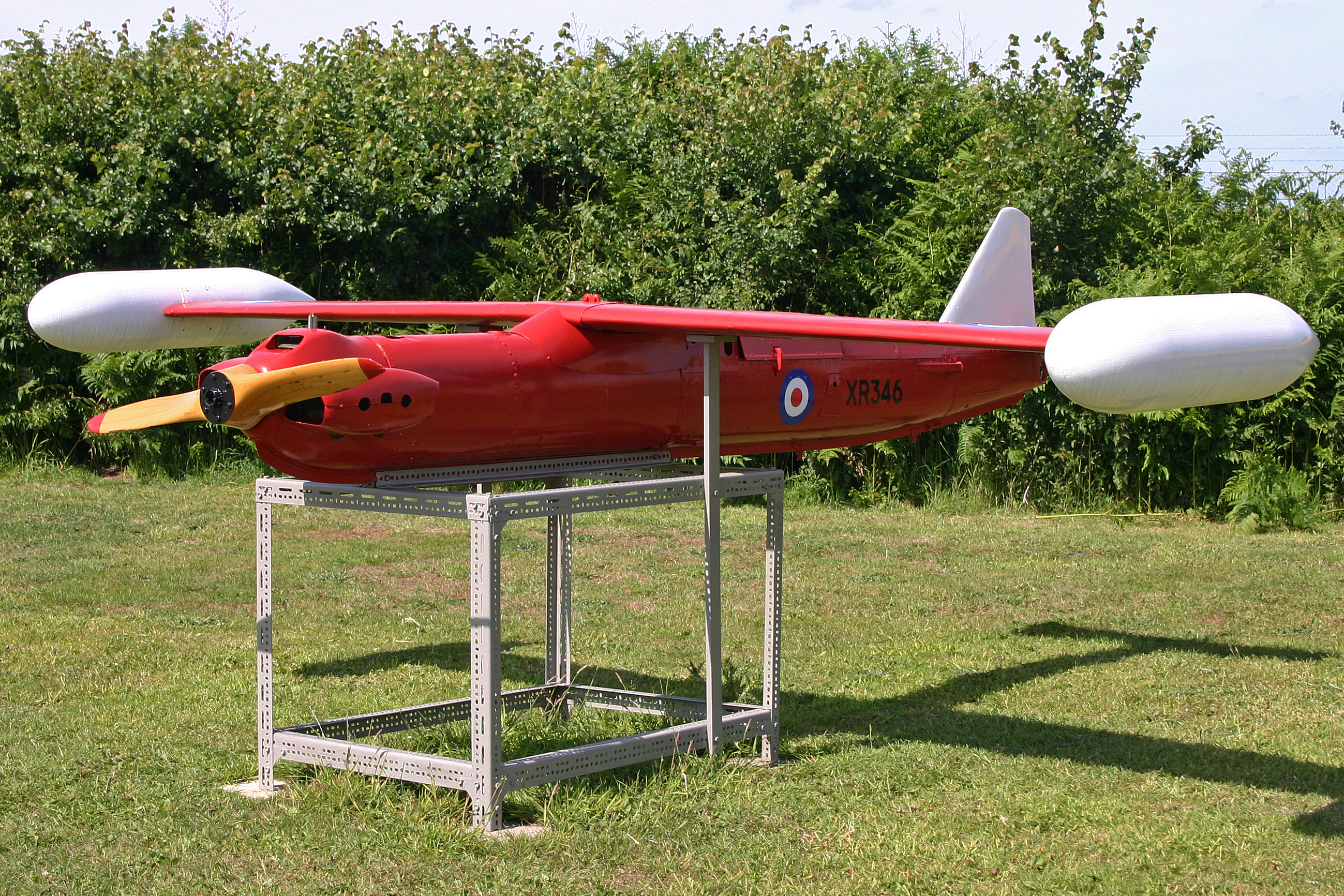
The Shelduck was Radioplane's greatest success, with 60,000 produced over several decades.

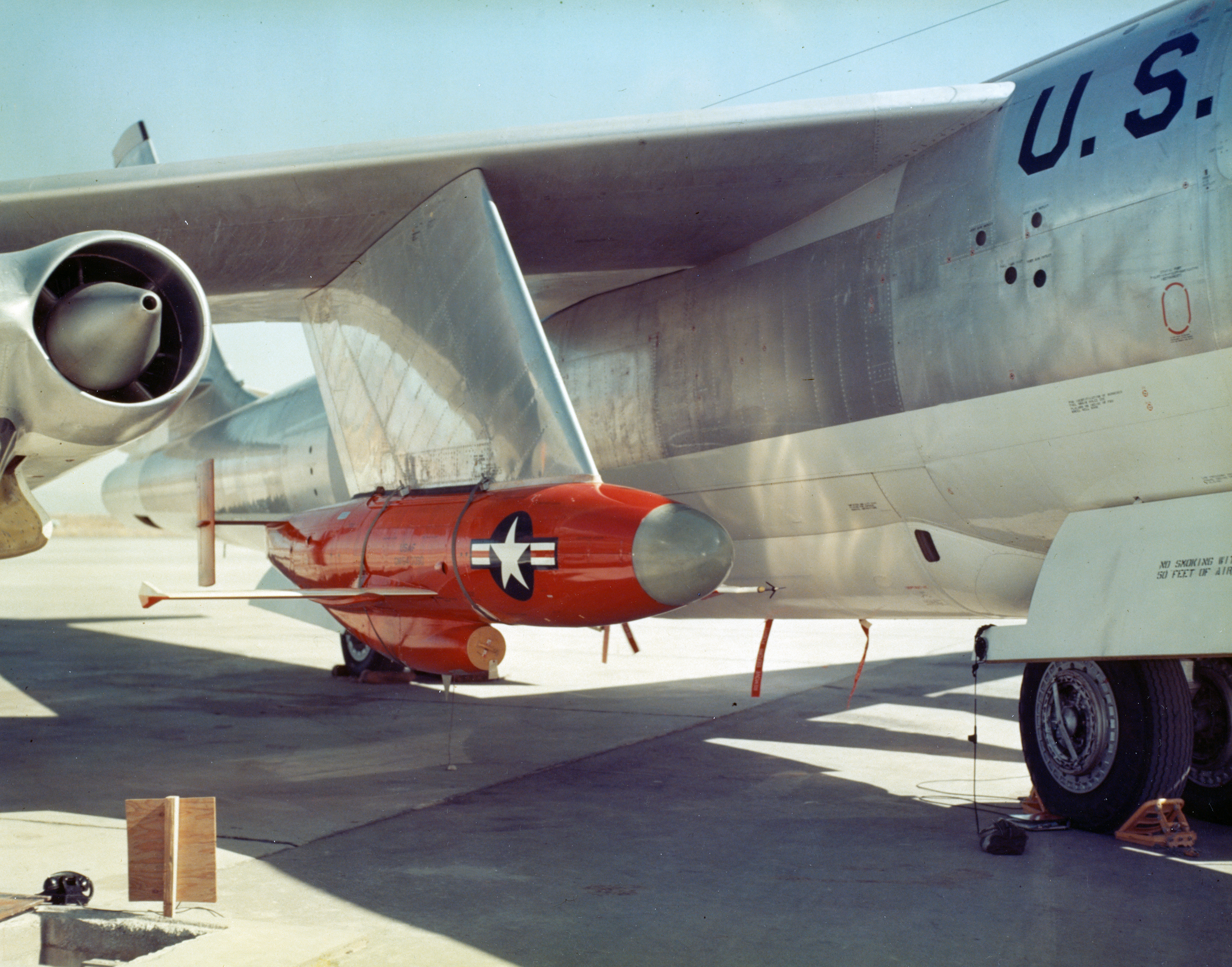
The Crossbow allowed USAF aircraft like this B-47 to attack Soviet missile sites long before approaching them.

Shortly after the end of the war the company produced a report sponsored by the Office of Naval Research with proposals for small aircraft capable of carrying a single marine over irradiated territory in an amphibious assault.

As the post-war wind-down began to take effect, Denny eventually sold his 25% stake in the company to Collins in 1948.

Late in the war the company began development of an entirely new drone design known as the Basic Training Target, or BTT. Unlike the previous models which retained some semblance of their original model-airplane origins, the BTT series were metal skinned and much more streamlined. The first examples mounted a 72 horsepower (54 kW) McCullough O-100-1 engine and was able to reach 220 miles per hour (350 km/h) and was designed so that at 700 feet (210 m) range it appeared and flew like a jet fighter flying at 700 miles per hour (1,100 km/h) at 300 yards (270 m) range. It entered service in 1950 with some examples used as late as the 1980s.

A further improvement was the OQ-19/KD2R-5, with a 95 horsepower (71 kW) McCullough that raised speed to 230 miles per hour (370 km/h). These included wing-tip mounts for teardrop-shaped radar reflectors that allowed them to be used with various radar-guided guns and missiles. These entered service as the MQM-36 Shelduck, and ultimately became the company's biggest success, with just 60,000 produced in a production run that lasted into the 1980s. A modified version of the Shelduck, the RP-71 Falconer (MQM-57), added an autopilot and camera mounts for battlefield reconnaissance duties.

For even higher speeds, the company began experimenting with pulsejet systems immediately after the war, building two experimental designs, the RP-21 and RP-26. In response to a call for high-speed target drones from the newly formed US Air Force, in 1950 the company introduced the Radioplane Q-1, powered by a small pulsejet. An attempt to build a version with the Continental YJ69 turbojet failed to find orders, and the role was taken over by the Ryan Firebee Q-2. Only a few dozen Q-1's were produced in total. The jet-powered Q-1 was then used in the development of the GAM-67 Crossbow, an experimental long-range anti-radiation missile. In 1953 they began development of the RP-61, a supersonic jet-powered drone that was powered by a XJ81 engine and able to reach Mach 1.55. Several improved models followed, but only 25 were produced.

The company was purchased by Northrop in 1952, becoming the Radioplane Division of Northrop. The factory later moved to a Northrop plant at Newbury Park, CA, and the name was changed to the Ventura Division, Northrop Corporation.
