= Radioplane Q-1 =

American target drone

Q-1
- Radioplane YQ-1B

General information
- Type: High-speed target drone
- Manufacturer: Radioplane Company
- Primary user: U.S. Air Force
- Number built: 34

History
- First flight: 1950
- Developed into: GAM-67 Crossbow

The Radioplane Q-1 was an American target drone, developed in the early 1950s for the United States Air Force by the Radioplane Company. Originally powered by a pulsejet engine, then later developed as an improved turbojet-powered aircraft, the Q-1 failed to win the favor of the USAF. However, the aircraft provided the basis of the GAM-67 Crossbow anti-radar missile.

== Design and development ==
Shortly after its formation in 1948, the United States Air Force issued a specification calling for a new type of high-speed target drone. Required to be jet-powered to provide the most realistic training, the contract for the development of the drone was given to the Radioplane Company, later a division of Northrop.

Powered by a single Giannini PJ39 pulsejet engine, the drone, given the designation RP-26 by the company and XQ-1 by the USAF, was a high-wing, rocket sled launched aircraft. Originally fitted with a large single vertical stabiliser, the design was modified to a twin tail configuration to provide additional clearance of its carrier aircraft. Recovery, following the conclusion of the drone's flight, was by parachute.

== Operational history ==
The first flight of the XQ-1 prototype took place in 1950; 28 aircraft of the type were built. Although the aircraft proved to be mostly satisfactory, the thirsty nature of the pulsejet engine limited the drone's endurance to a mere 60 minutes. In an attempt to increase the potential flight time of the aircraft, one XQ-1 was re-engined with a Continental YJ69 turbojet replacing the pulsejet, becoming the XQ-1A; however it was determined that further improvements were needed, and so a major redesign of the type was undertaken.

Known by the company as RP-50 and designated by the USAF as YQ-1B, the revised drone flew for the first time during 1953, being evaluated by the Air Force later that year. Using the YJ69 engine, the air intake for the jet was relocated to the nose of the aircraft, while the airframe overall was modified to increase the streamlining of the craft. The rocket-sled launch was abandoned in favor of air launching, with the Douglas DB-26 being the most common carrier aircraft.

Six YQ-1Bs were built for evaluation; they proved trouble-free, no production order for the type was undertaken, the competing Ryan Q-2 drone having been selected for operational service instead; as a result, the Q-1 program was terminated. However, the YQ-1B airframe was used by Radioplane as the start of development of a new anti-radar missile, which would be tested by the U.S. Air Force as the GAM-67 Crossbow.

== Variants ==
XQ-1
Initial pulsejet-powered prototype with single tail; later refitted with twin tails. 28 built.
XQ-1A
Turbojet-powered version. One modified from XQ-1.
YQ-1B
Definitive turbojet-powered version, six built.
XQ-3
Variant planned to be constructed of fiberglass, none built.

== Specifications (YQ-1B) ==
Data from

General characteristics

- Crew: None (UAV)
- Length: 18 ft 4 in (5.59 m)
- Wingspan: 14 ft 4.5 in (4.382 m)
- Height: 4 ft 5 in (1.35 m)
- Max takeoff weight: 1,800 lb (816 kg)
- Powerplant: 1 × Continental YJ69-T-3 turbojet, 880 lbf (3.9 kN) thrust

Performance

- Maximum speed: 345 mph (555 km/h, 300 kn)

== See also ==
- List of missiles
- Unmanned aerial vehicle

Related development

- GAM-67 Crossbow

Aircraft of comparable role, configuration, and era

- Globe KD2G Firefly
- Ryan Firebee

Related lists

- List of military aircraft of the United States
- List of unmanned aerial vehicles
