= Bournemouth Aviation Museum =

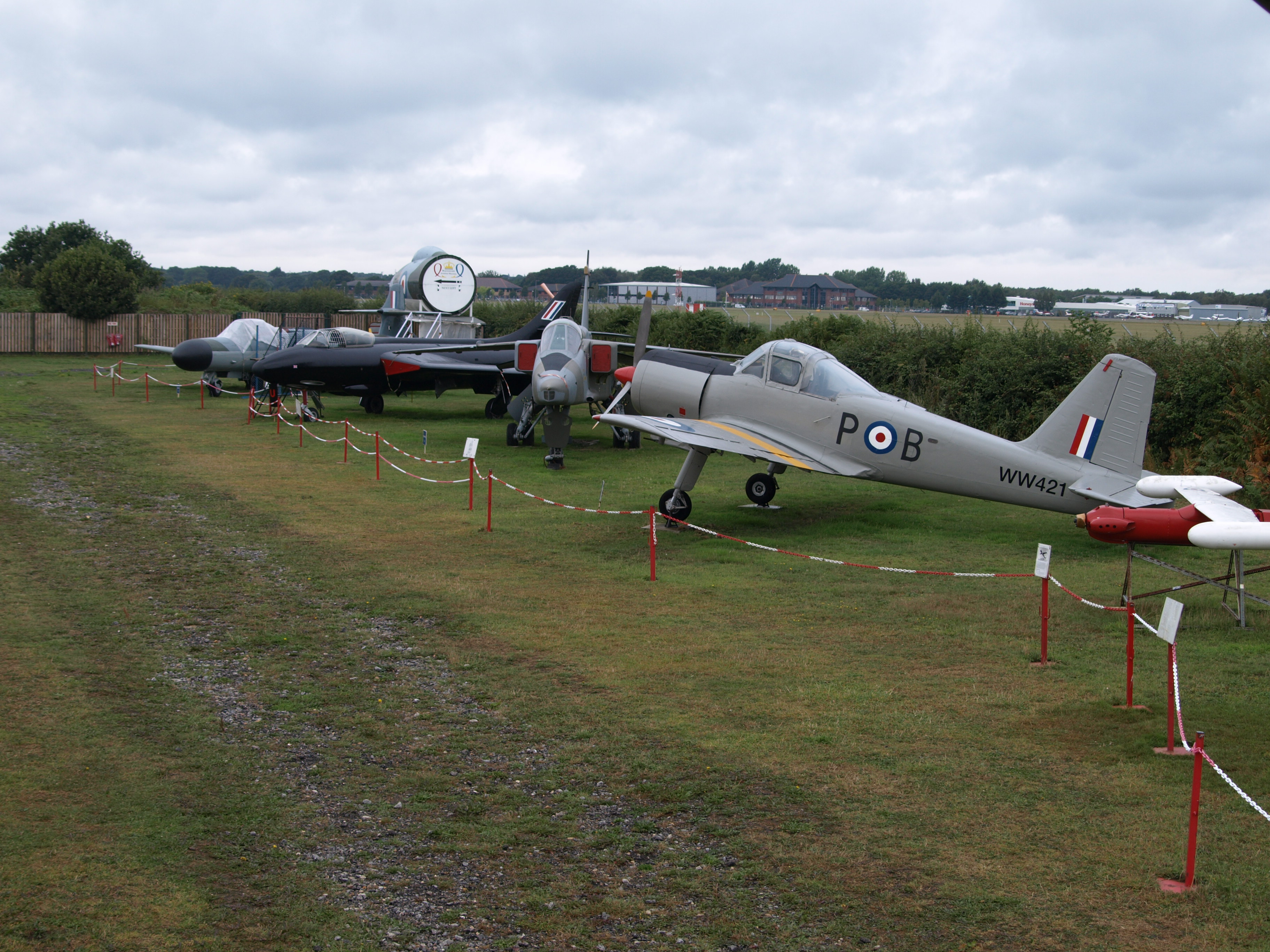

- Location within Dorset
- Former name: Jet Heritage Museum
- Established: May 1998
- Location: Merritown Lane, Hurn, Dorset
- Coordinates: 50.7757°N 1.8426°W
- Type: Aviation museum
- Website: www.aviation-museum.co.uk

The Bournemouth Aviation Museum is an aviation museum located next to Bournemouth International Airport, near the village of Hurn in Christchurch, England. It houses a number of aircraft, aero engines, cockpits, and a limited number of ground vehicles.

== History ==
The museum was founded in May 1998 as the Jet Heritage Museum and was located on the property of Bournemouth Airport. However, the following year it was renamed Bournemouth Aviation Museum. Then, due to expansion of the airport, in 2008 the museum was forced to move to a site near the Adventure Wonderland theme park on the south side of the B3073 road.

In 2013, the museum acquired a Boeing 737-200 named "The Spirit of Peter Bath" and has created an exhibition about Sir Peter Bath and his company Bath Travel inside the fuselage.

== Collection ==
=== Aircraft on display ===
- Avro Vulcan B.2 (MRR) XH537 – Nose section only
- BAC One-Eleven ZE432 – Forward fuselage only
- British Aerospace 125 ZD620
- British Aerospace Jetstream 31 640 – Nose section only
- Boeing 737-200 21135
- BAC Jet Provost T.5A XW310
- CMC Leopard 001
- Colomban Cri-Cri 12-0135
- de Havilland Vampire T.11 XE856
- English Electric Canberra PR.7 WT532 – Nose section only
- English Electric Lightning F.53 ZF582 – Nose section only
- Gloster Meteor NF.14 WS776
- Grumman American AA-1B 0245
- Grumman AA-5 Tiger 0979
- Handley Page Herald 175 – Forward fuselage only
- Handley Page Victor K.2 XL164 – Nose section only
- Hawker Hunter F.6 XG160
- Hunting Jet Provost T.3 XM404
- North American Harvard IIB Composite
- Percival Provost T.1 WW450/WW421
- Radioplane Shelduck D.1 XR346/XV383/XW578
- SEPECAT Jaguar GR.1 XX763
- Vickers Vanguard – Nose section only
- Vickers Viscount 263 – Nose section only
- Westland Wasp HAS.1 XT431
- Westland Wessex HAS.3 XT257

=== Engines on display ===
- Bristol Siddeley Orpheus
- Daimler-Benz DB 601
- Junkers Jumo 211
- Rolls-Royce Avon
- Rolls-Royce Griffon
- Rolls-Royce Nene
- Rolls-Royce Viper

== See also ==
- Bournemouth Air Festival
- List of aerospace museums
