= Longbow (ALBM) =

American abortive air-launched ballistic missile

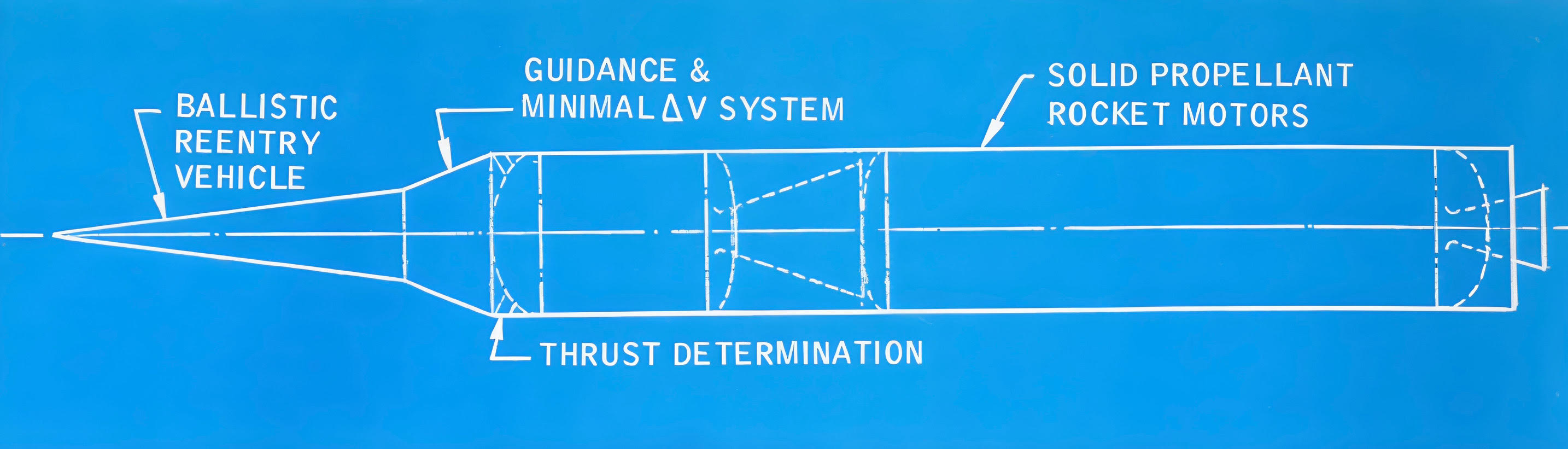
- Basic blueprint of the Longbow
- Type: Air-launched ballistic missile intended for use as an anti-radar and ultra long-range air-to-air missile
- Place of origin: United States of America

Service history
- In service: Development began in the 1970s and was ultimately cancelled in the early 1980s

Production history
- Manufacturer: None selected
- No. built: Unknown, possibly none

Specifications
- Engine: Unknown; Speculated to be a two-stage system
- Propellant: Multi-stage rocket
- Operational range: Up to 2,300 mi (3,700 km)
- Maximum speed: At least 2,600 mph (4,200 km/h) (Mach 3.5)
- Guidance system: Unknown; Presumed to utilize a passive radiation-seeker plus some form of mid-course guidance such as Navstar (GPS)
- Launch platform: Strategic bombers

The Longbow air-launched ballistic missile (ALBM) was a 1970s attempt by the United States Air Force to create an ALBM which could be carried and launched by strategic bombers, such as the B-52 Stratofortress or a dedicated "cruise missile carrying aircraft." Intended to serve as both an air-to-ground and ultra-long range air-to-air missile, the Longbow was ultimately cancelled in the early 1980s.

== Development ==
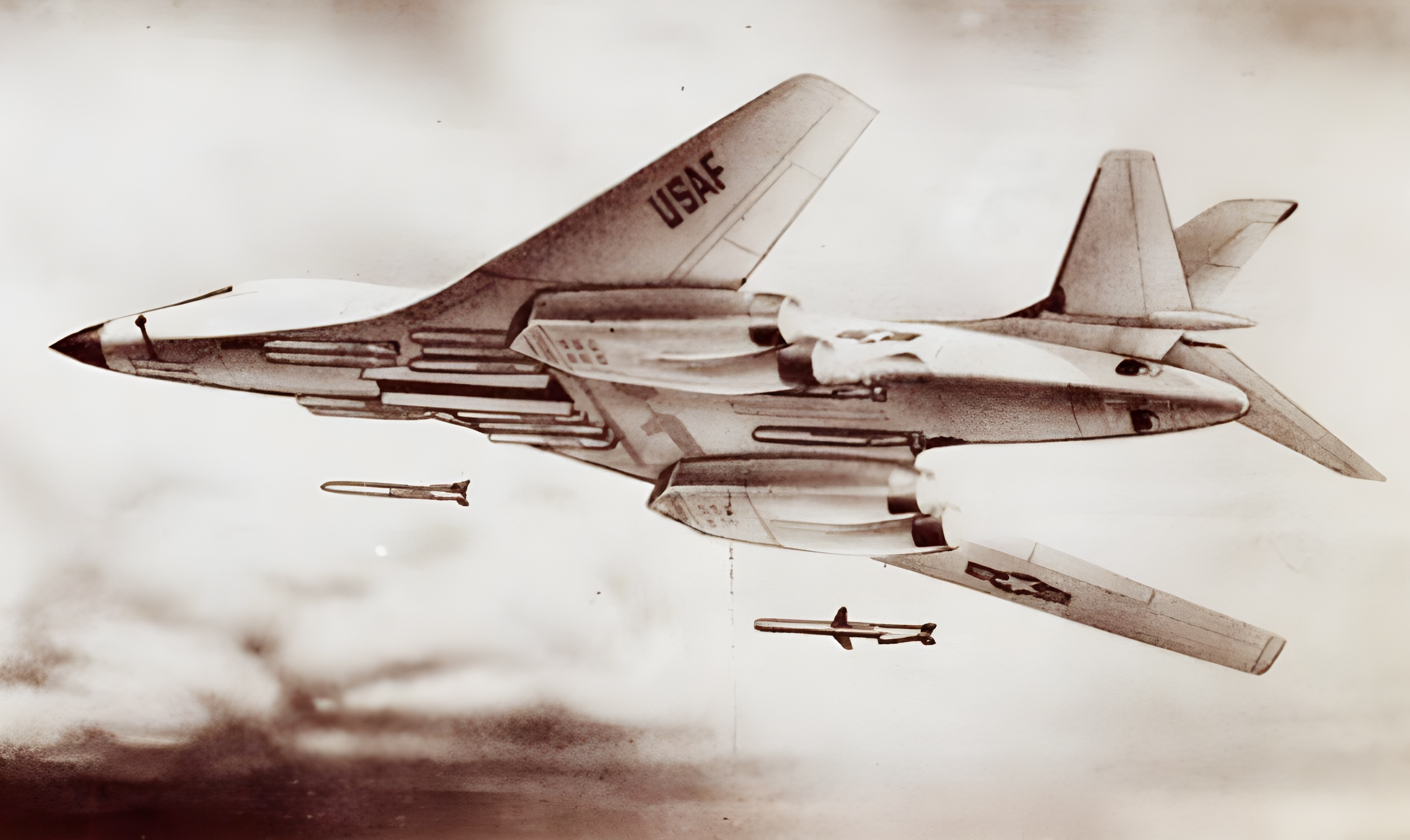
USAF concept art of a "Cruise Missile Carrying Aircraft" (CMCA) launching air-launched ballistic missiles or cruise missiles, possibly Longbow missiles (image has been upscaled via generative AI)

The Longbow was a very long-range air-launched missile planned to be carried by the B-52 Stratofortress; It could be equipped with either conventional or nuclear warheads, with the B-52 being capable of carrying up to 16 at one time. The missile was allegedly capable of engaging both ground and air targets and would have had a range of up to 2,300 miles (3,700 kilometres), though it is unclear how such a missile would have been guided against targets (particularly aerial targets) out to such ranges. Speculation of guidance mechanics included the use of Navstar satellites coupled with various seekers for the terminal phase. The Longbow would likely loft to extremely high-altitudes (where drag would be minimal) to attain its extreme ranges.

The Longbow would have likely utilized a two-stage engine system, was roughly 20 feet (6.1 metres) long, and weighed around 4,000–5,000 pounds (1,800–2,300 kilograms).

The Longbow ALBM was distinct from the 1960s WS-121B Longbow, though both missiles were air-to-ground/air-to-air capable and both were intended to be launched from large airframes.

== See also ==
- AIM-174B Gunslinger
