= CMC Leopard =

Leopard
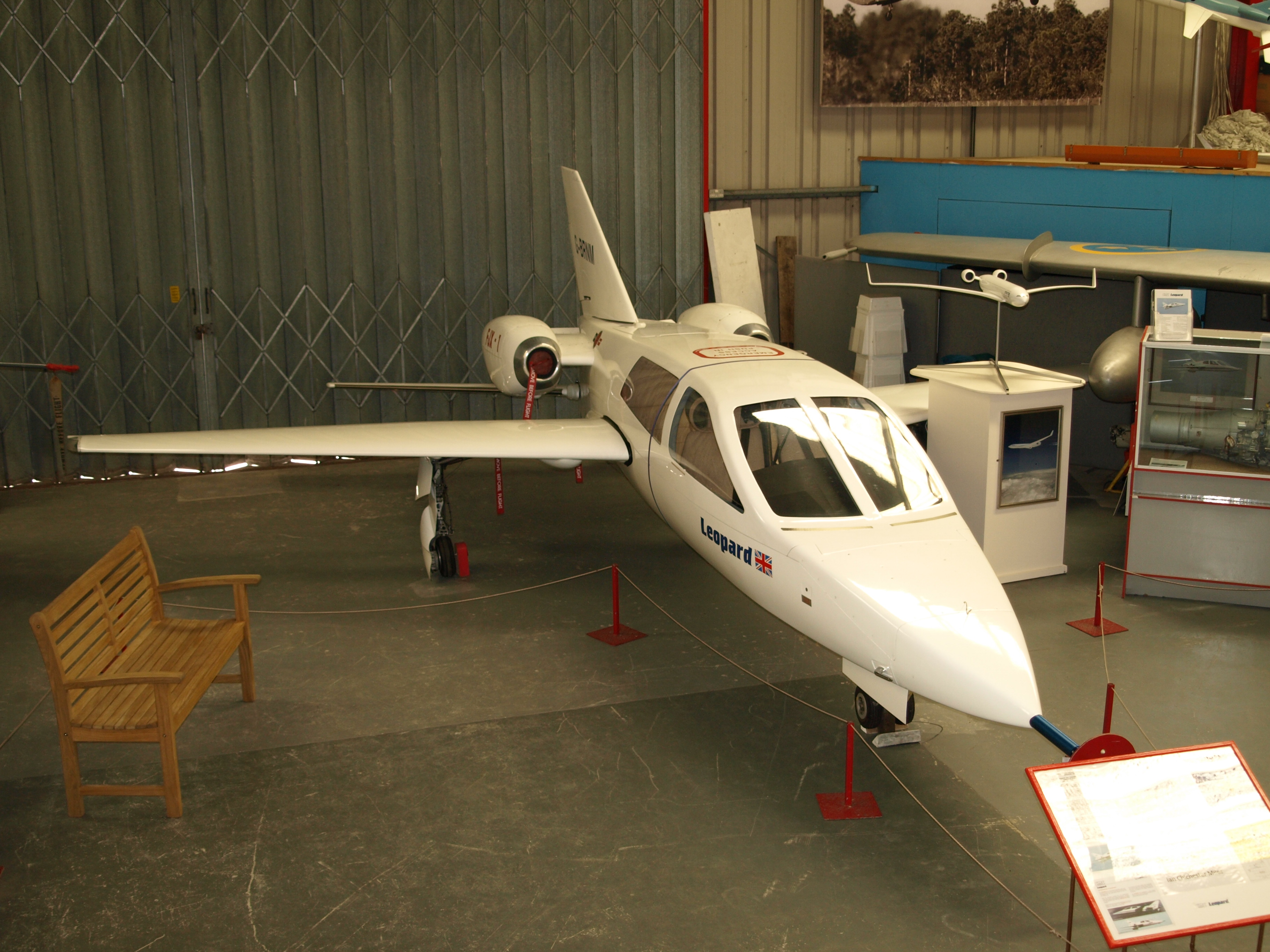
- CMC Leopard G-BRNM on display at the Midland Air Museum

General information
- Type: Business jet
- Manufacturer: Chichester-Miles Consultants
- Designer: Ian Chichester-Miles
- Status: Project cancelled, both aircraft withdrawn from use
- Number built: 2

History
- First flight: 12 December 1988

The CMC Leopard was a British light personal business jet developed in the 1980s. Two prototypes were built and flown, but the type was never put into production.

== Design and development ==
The Leopard was a twin-jet, mid-wing monoplane of composite construction with all-swept flying surfaces and jet fighter-like styling, apart from the podded engines, mounted on each side of the rear fuselage. The entire canopy hinged forward to allow access to the four reclining seats.

A mockup was completed in 1982, leading to a prototype (registration G-BKRL) built by the Designability company. The prototype first flew late in 1988. Development suffered a major setback when the engine manufacturer, Noel Penny Turbines, ceased business, leading to the grounding of the prototype. A second, refined prototype (registration G-BRNM) was then constructed to use Williams International turbofans. This aircraft also incorporated a pressurised cabin, revised undercarriage, and a generally strengthened airframe. This second prototype was unveiled at the 1996 Farnborough International Airshow and first flew on 9 April 1997.

The project never progressed beyond the two aircraft built, later redesignated Leopard Four to distinguish them from a six-seat variant proposed in 2001, the Leopard Six. The EJ22 engine could no longer be used due to exclusive deal between Williams and Eclipse, resulting in the Six being proposed to make use of the larger FJ33. Chief aircraft designer and CMC chairman Ian Chichester-Miles died in 2009, bringing the enterprise to an end.

== Aircraft on display ==
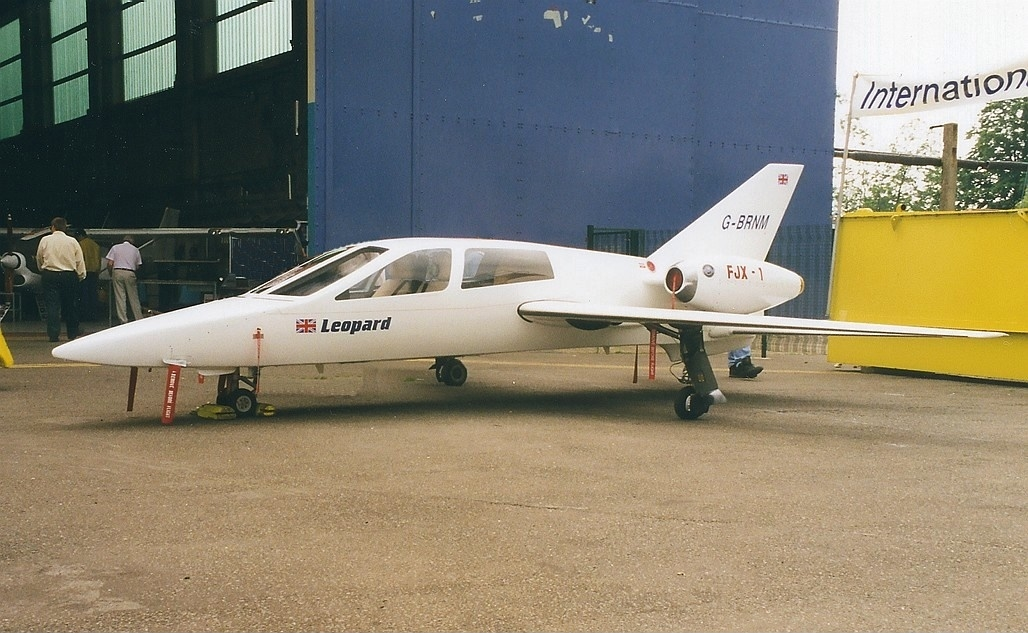
CMC Leopard G-BRNM in 1997 at Cranfield

Until 2007, both prototype Leopards, G-BKRL and G-BRNM, were on display at the Bournemouth Aviation Museum. With the museum's temporary closure and relocation in 2008, only the former was retained and moved to the new site, while G-BRNM was acquired by the Midland Air Museum at Coventry Airport.

== Specifications (second prototype) ==
General characteristics

- Crew: One pilot
- Capacity: 3 passengers
- Length: 24 ft 9 in (7.54 m)
- Wingspan: 23 ft 6 in (7.16 m)
- Height: 6 ft 9 in (2.06 m)
- Wing area: 63 sq ft (5.85 m^{2})
- Powerplant: 2 × Williams FJX-1 , 700 lbf (3.1 kN) thrust each

Performance

- Maximum speed: 540 mph (869 km/h, 470 kn)
- Range: 1,726 mi (2,778 km, 1,500 nmi)
- Service ceiling: 55,000 ft (16,765 m)
- Rate of climb: 6,340 ft/min (32.7 m/s)
