= Longbow Motorcar Company =

British electric sports car company

Logo of Longbow Motorcar Company

Longbow Motorcar Company (or Longbow) is a British electric sports car company. It unveiled its first model, the Longbow Speedster, in 2025, with plans to launch the Longbow Roadster in 2027.

The company was founded by Daniel Davey and Mark Tapscott in 2023, both of whom have previous automotive experience with Tesla and Lucid. Jenny Keisu, former CEO of electric boat company X Shore, joined the leadership team at the end of 2025.

== Longbow Speedster ==
Announced in the autumn of 2025, the open top Speedster weighs only 895 kg (1,973 lb). Power output is expected to be about 300 bhp (224 kW; 304 PS) from its rear mounted motor. The company claims 0-62 mph in 3.5 seconds and a battery range of 275 miles. Production is scheduled during 2026 with prices starting from £84,995.
