= GAM-67 Crossbow =

Type of anti-radar missile

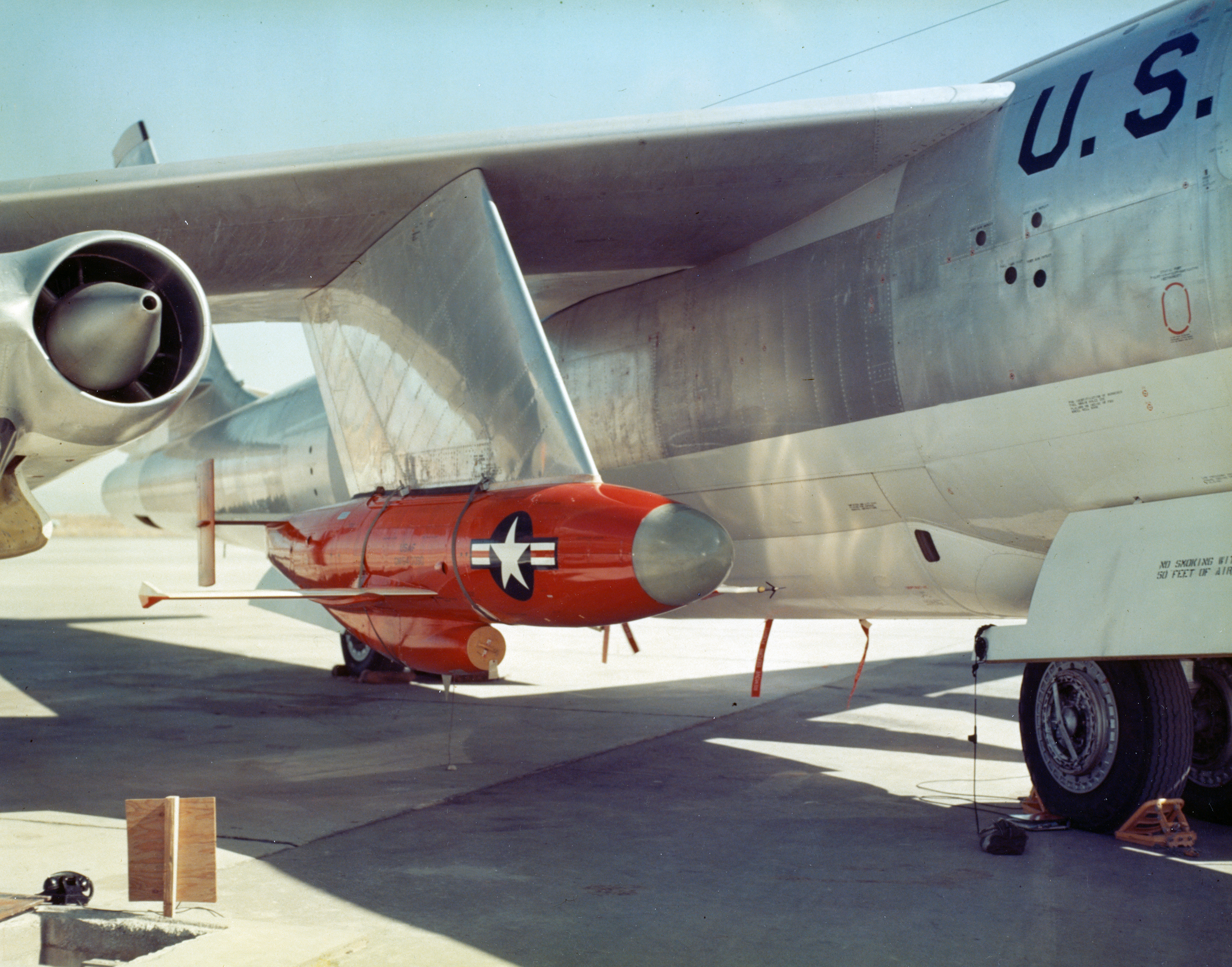
- Crossbow on B-47 carrier aircraft
- Type: Anti-radar missile
- Place of origin: United States

Production history
- Manufacturer: Northrop Ventura Division
- No. built: 14

Specifications
- Mass: 2,800 lb (1,270 kg)
- Length: 19 ft 1 in (5.82 m)
- Height: 4 ft 6 (1.37 m)
- Diameter: 32 in (81 cm)
- Wingspan: 12 ft 6 in (3.81 m)
- Engine: Continental J69 turbojet
- Operational range: 300 miles (480 km)
- Flight altitude: 40,000 ft (12,200 m)
- Maximum speed: 675 mph (1,090 km/h)
- Guidance system: passive multiple-frequency radar seeker, autopilot and a radio-command guidance system
- Launch platform: Aircraft or RATO

WS-121B Longbow
- Type: Anti-radar missile and ultra long-range air-to-air missile
- Place of origin: United States

Service history
- In service: Initially developed post-1957, cancelled in early- to mid-1960s

Production history
- Manufacturer: Northrop Ventura Division
- No. built: Unknown, possibly none

Specifications
- Engine: Unknown
- Operational range: At least 300 mi (480 km)
- Maximum speed: 2,600 mph (4,200 km/h) (Mach 3.5)
- Guidance system: Unknown; Presumed to be similar to the Crossbow's guidance
- Launch platform: Strategic bombers

The GAM-67 Crossbow was a turbojet-powered anti-radar missile built by Northrop's Ventura Division, the successor to the Radioplane Company who developed the Crossbow's predecessor, the Q-1 target drone. The Crossbow was intended to be carried by and launched from strategic bombers of the United States Air Force (USAF), allowing them to attack air defences and blast their way through to their targets. The program was cancelled in 1957 when it was seen that the subsonic speed meant the missile could not get far enough ahead of the bombers to be useful. The WS-121B Longbow was a larger and faster follow-on missile but was also ultimately cancelled in the late 1960s or early 1970s. This role was ultimately filled by the supersonic AGM-28 Hound Dog.

== Development and cancellation ==
In the late 1940s, the Radioplane Company developed a set of prototypes of the Q-1 target series, which used pulsejet or small turbojet engines. Although the Q-1 series was not put into production as a target, it did evolve into the USAF RP-54D / XB-67 / XGAM-67 Crossbow anti-radar missile, which was first flown in 1956. It was also considered as a platform for reconnaissance, electronic countermeasures, and decoy roles.

The Crossbow had a cigar-shaped fuselage, straight wings, a straight twin-fin tail, and an engine inlet under the belly. It was powered by a Continental J69 turbojet engine, with 4.41 kN (450 kgf/1,000 lbf) thrust. Two Crossbows could be carried by a Boeing B-50 Superfortress bomber, while four Crossbows could be carried by a Boeing B-47 Stratojet bomber. While under-development and prior to being assigned the "GAM-67" designation, the Crossbow was known as the WS-121A.

The Crossbow's speed was not enough to allow it to get far ahead of the launching bomber before it ran out of fuel. Only 14 Crossbows were built before the program was cancelled in 1957.

== WS-121B Longbow ==
Following cancellation, work shifted to the WS-121B Longbow, essentially a supersonic version of the Crossbow. The Longbow was a very long-range air-launched missile planned to be carried by the B-52 Stratofortress; Longbow was cancelled as well at some time in the 1960s. The Longbow could be equipped with either conventional or nuclear warheads, with the B-52 being capable of carrying up to twenty at one time. The missile was allegedly capable of engaging both ground and air targets and would have had a range of up to 300 miles (480 kilometres), though it is unclear how such a missile would have been guided against aerial targets out to such ranges. The Longbow never received an "official" designation (unlike the GAM-67 Crossbow).

== See also ==
- AIM-174B Gunslinger
