= Radioplane OQ-2 =

1930s American unmanned aerial vehicle

RQ-4, OQ-2, OQ-3, OQ-7, OQ-13, OQ-14, and TDD
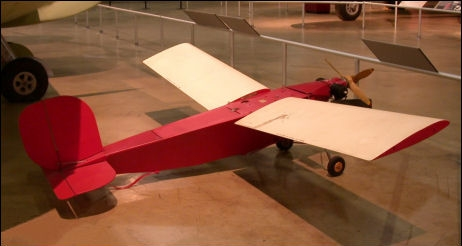

General information
- Type: Target drone
- National origin: United States
- Manufacturer: Radioplane
- Primary user: USAAF
- Number built: ca. 15,000

History
- First flight: 1939

The Radioplane OQ-2 was the first mass-produced unmanned aerial vehicle or drone in the United States, manufactured by the Radioplane Company. A follow-on version, the OQ-3, became the most widely used target drone in US service, with over 9,400 being built during World War II.

== History ==
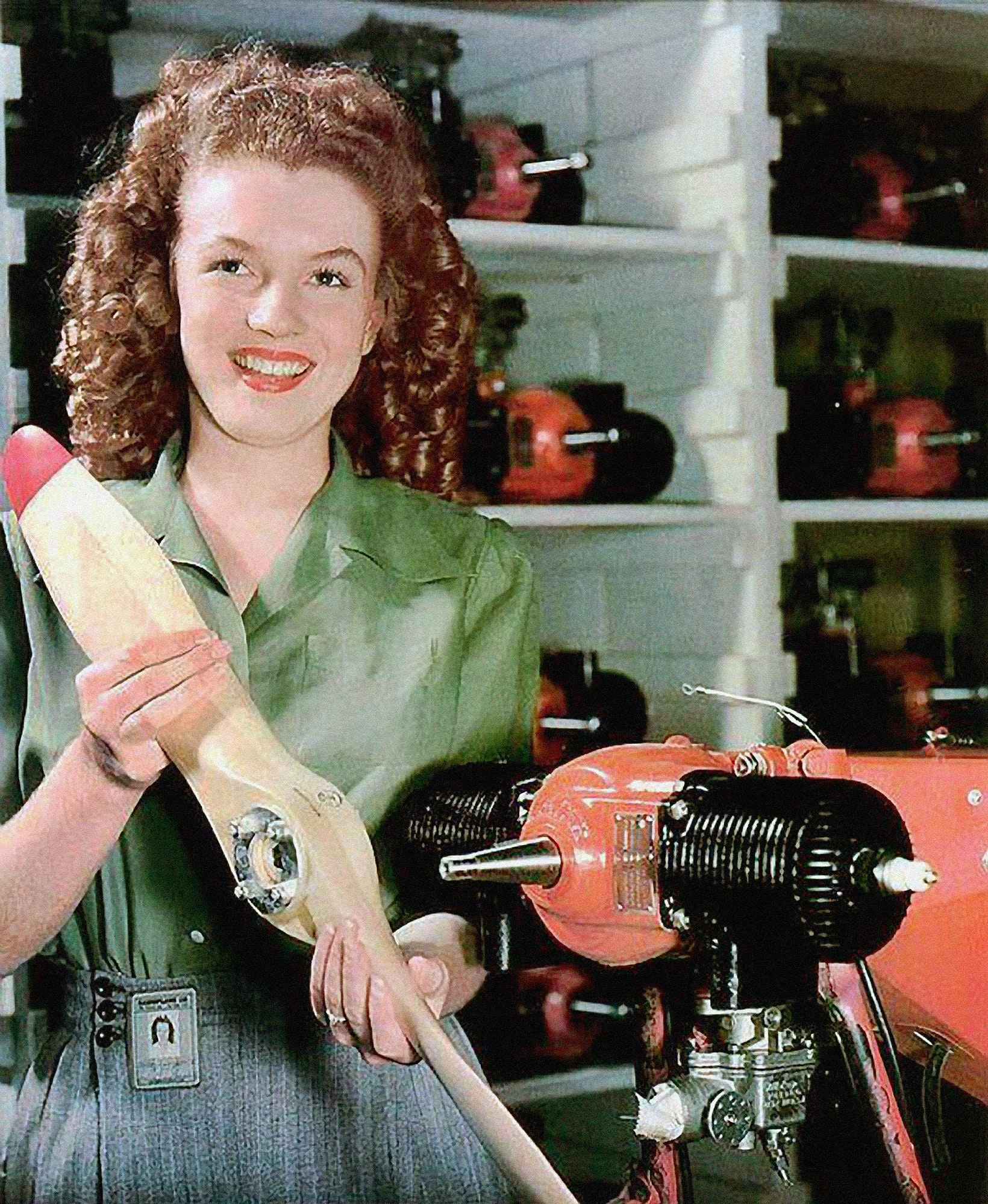
Marilyn Monroe with an RP-5's propeller

The OQ-2 was originally a radio-controlled aircraft model designed by Walter Righter. The design, along with its engine design, was purchased by actor Reginald Denny, who had demonstrated another model to the US Army in 1940. Calling the new design the RP-2, he demonstrated several updated versions to the Army as the RP-2, RP-3 and RP-4 in 1939.

In 1940, the Army placed an order for 53 RP-4s (some sources refer to the RP-4 as OQ-1. but that designation was never assigned). This small order led to a much bigger 1941 order for the similar RP-5, which became the US Army OQ-2, the OQ meaning a "subscale target". The US Navy also bought the drone, designating it TDD-1, for Target Drone, Denny, 1. Thousands were built, manufactured at the Radioplane plant at the Van Nuys Airport in the Los Angeles metropolitan area.

It was at this factory on June 26, 1945, that David Conover, an Army photographer, shot pictures of a young woman assembler named Norma Jeane Dougherty. Thinking she had potential as a model, he invited her to pose, and his encouragment led her to pursue work at a modeling agency, where her success prompted her to take a screen test and begin an acting career as Marilyn Monroe.

== Description and variants ==
The OQ-2 is a simple aircraft, powered by a two-cylinder two-cycle piston engine, providing 6 horsepower (4.5 kW) and driving two contra-rotating propellers. The RC control system was built by Bendix. Launching was by catapult only and recovery by parachute, should it survive the target practice. The landing gear was used only on the OQ-2 versions as sold to the Army to cushion the landing by parachute. None of the drones including the improved variants shipped to the Navy had landing gear. The subsequent variants delivered to the Army did not have landing gear.

The OQ-2 led to a series of similar but improved variants, with the OQ-3 / TDD-2 and OQ-14 / TDD-3 produced in quantity. A number of other target drones were built by Radioplane (including licensed contractors) and competing companies during the war, most of which never got beyond prototype stage, which accounts for the gaps in the designation sequence between "OQ-3" and "OQ-14".

After World War II ended, various experiment were made with Radioplane target drones. In one experiment in 1950, a derivative of the QQ-3 Radioplane drone was used to lay military communication wire.

During the war Radioplane manufactured nearly fifteen thousand drones. The company was bought by Northrop in 1952.

== Surviving aircraft ==
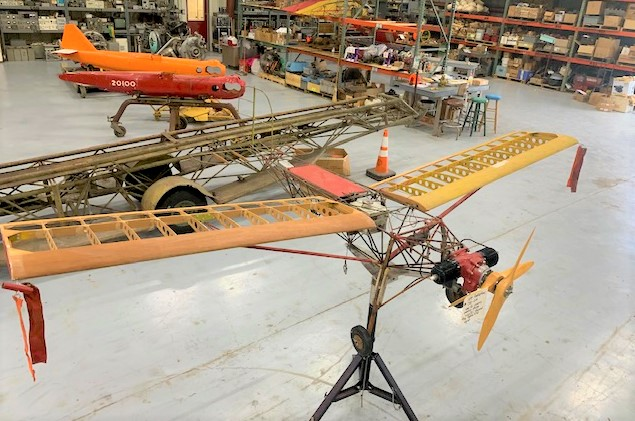
OQ-2 on display at the Aviation Unmanned Vehicle Museum

- OQ-2 on display at the National Museum of the United States Air Force in Dayton, Ohio.
- OQ-2 on display at the March Field Air Museum in Riverside, California.
- OQ-2 on display at the Aviation Unmanned Vehicle Museum in Caddo Mills, Texas.
- OQ-2 or OQ-3 on display at the National Warplane Museum in Geneseo, New York.
- RP-5A on display at the Western Museum of Flight in Torrance, California.
- OQ-2A on display at the National Model Aviation Museum in Muncie, Indiana.
- OQ-2A on display at the Museum of the American G.I. in College Station, Texas.
- OQ-2A on display at the Air and Military Museum of the Ozarks in Springfield, Missouri.
- OQ-3 on display at the Pima Air & Space Museum in Tucson, Arizona.
- OQ-3 on display at the United States Army Aviation Museum at Fort Novosel near Daleville, Alabama.
- OQ-14 in storage at the National Air and Space Museum in Washington, D.C.

== Specifications (OQ-2) ==
General characteristics

- Length: 8 ft 8 in (2.65 m)
- Wingspan: 12 ft 3 in (3.73 m)
- Gross weight: 104 lb (47 kg)
- Powerplant: 1 × Righter O-15-1 , 7 hp (5 kW)

Performance

- Maximum speed: 85 mph (137 km/h, 74 kn)
- Endurance: 1 hour

== See also ==
- History of unmanned aerial vehicles § Reginald Denny and the Radioplane

Related lists

- List of military aircraft of the United States
