= Ryan Firebee =

Series of target drones

Firebee
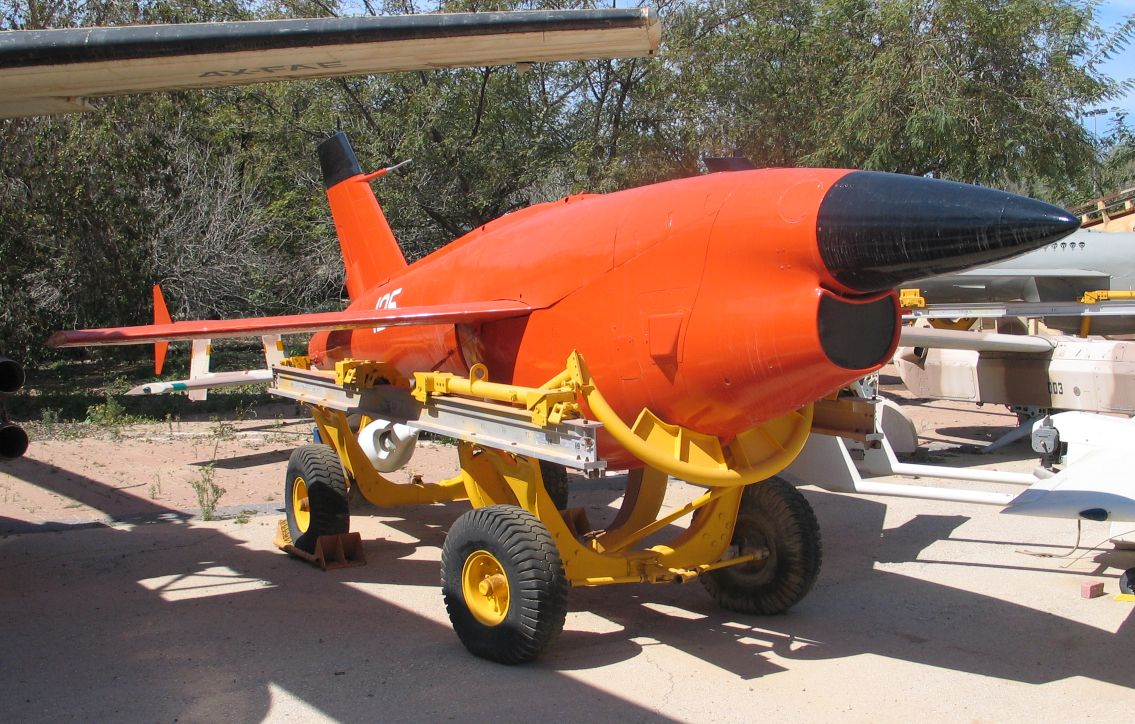
- Ryan Model 124 / BQM-34A Firebee

General information
- Type: Unmanned aerial vehicle / Aerial target
- Manufacturer: Ryan Aeronautical
- Primary users: United States Air Force United States Navy; United States Army; Canadian Armed Forces

History
- Introduction date: 1952
- First flight: 1951
- Developed into: Ryan Model 147

The Ryan Firebee is a series of target drones developed by the Ryan Aeronautical Company beginning in 1951. It was one of the first jet-propelled drones, and remains one of the most widely used target drones ever built.

== Development ==
=== Ryan Firebee I ===
==== Q-2/KDA-1 Firebee ====
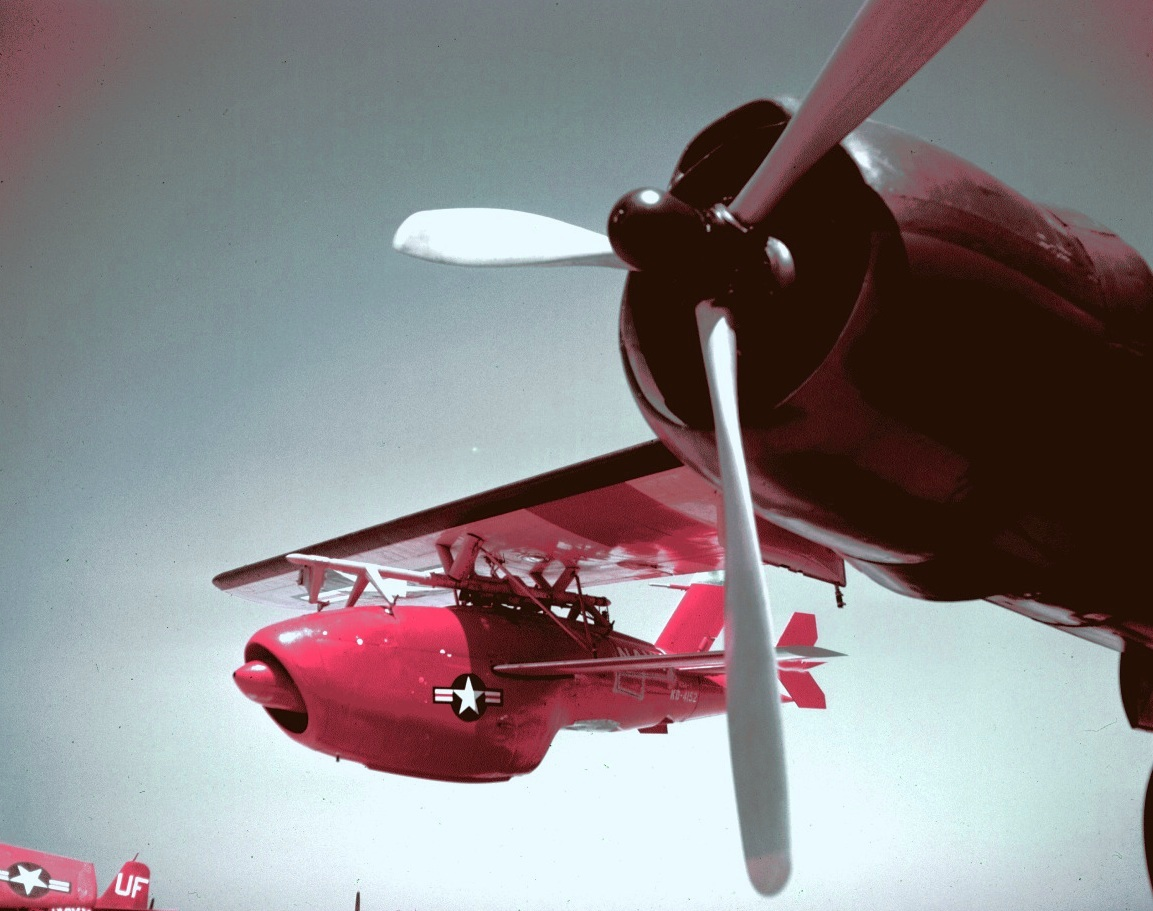
KDA Firebee under the wing of a JD-1 Invader

The Firebee I was the result of a 1948 U.S. Air Force request and contract to Ryan for a jet-powered gunnery target. The first flight of the XQ-2 Firebee prototype took place in early 1951. The drone featured swept flight surfaces and a circular nose inlet. The initial models had distinctive "arrowhead" shaped endplates on the tailplane. The Firebee could be air-launched from a specially modified launch aircraft (Douglas A-26 Invader was first to be used for this purpose), or ground-launched with a single RATO booster.

Following successful evaluation the target was ordered into production for the USAF as the Q-2A, powered by a Continental J69-T-19B turbojet engine with 1,060 pounds-force (4.7 kN) of thrust. The Air Force then obtained small numbers of a Q-2B with a more powerful engine for high-altitude performance.

The U.S. Navy bought the Firebee as the KDA-1 which was mostly similar to the Q-2A, differing mainly in its powerplant: a Fairchild J44-R-20B turbojet with 1,000 lb_{f} (4.4 kN) thrust. The KDA-1 and Q-2A could be distinguished by the KDA-1's protruding inlet centerbody and wider, steeply raked inlet. The U.S. Army also obtained a KDA-1 version designated the XM21 that differed only in minor details.

The Navy obtained several improved variants of the KDA-1, including the XKDA-2 and XKDA-3 which were not built in quantity, and the KDA-4, which was the main production version for the series. These variants were difficult to distinguish from the KDA-1, differing mainly in successively uprated J44 engines and other minor changes.

==== Royal Canadian Air Force Use ====
The RCAF purchased 30 KDA-4 Firebees, which were flown from two specially converted Avro Lancaster Mk.10DC Drone Carriers from 1956 to 1961. These were used to test the weapons system for the Avro Canada CF-100 and Avro Canada CF-105 Arrow. The cancellation of the latter brought the drone program to an end as it was no longer needed for the Sparrow II missile that would have armed the Arrow.

==== Model 124/BQM-34A ====
In the late 1950s, the USAF awarded Ryan a contract for a substantially improved "second generation" Firebee, the Model 124, originally with the designation Q-2C. The initial prototype performed its first flight in late 1958 and went into production in 1960. In 1963, it was redesignated the BQM-34A. The old first-generation KDA-1 and KDA-4 targets then still flying with the Navy were (somewhat confusingly) given the respective redesignations AQM-34B and AQM-34C.

The BQM-34A emerged as the Firebee as it is recognized today, with a bigger airframe, longer wings, and a particular "chin"-type inlet under a pointed nose (in contrast to the circular intake of the first-generation Firebees). It was powered by a Continental J69-T-29A turbojet, a copy of the improved Turbomeca Gourdon derivative of the Marbore, with 1,700 lb_{f} (7.6 kN) thrust. The U.S. Navy also adopted the BQM-34A, while the Army obtained a ground-launched version designated MQM-34D with longer wings and a heavier JATO booster.

A feature of the second-generation Firebee is that some photographs show it to with triangular endplates on the tailplane, while others show no endplates but feature a ventral fin under the tail, and still others have neither endplates nor ventral fin. Since most modern photographs of Firebees show the ventral fin, this may have been due to production changes or later refits (reference sources are unclear on this).

In 1960 the first stealth technology development program was initiated by USAF, by reducing the radar cross-section of a Q-2C drone. This was achieved through specially designed screens over the air intake, radiation-absorbent material on the fuselage and a special radar-absorbing paint.

During the 1970s the U.S. Army updated some of their MQM-34Ds for use as targets for FIM-92 Stinger man-portable SAMs, refitting these drones with a General Electric J85-GE-7 turbojet of 10.9 kN (2,500 lb_{f}) thrust which were salvaged from old ADM-20 Quail decoys. The modified MQM-34Ds featured a revised forward fuselage with a circular nose intake that gave them an appearance similar to that of a "stretched" first-generation Q-2A target, and were given the designation of MQM-34D Mod II.

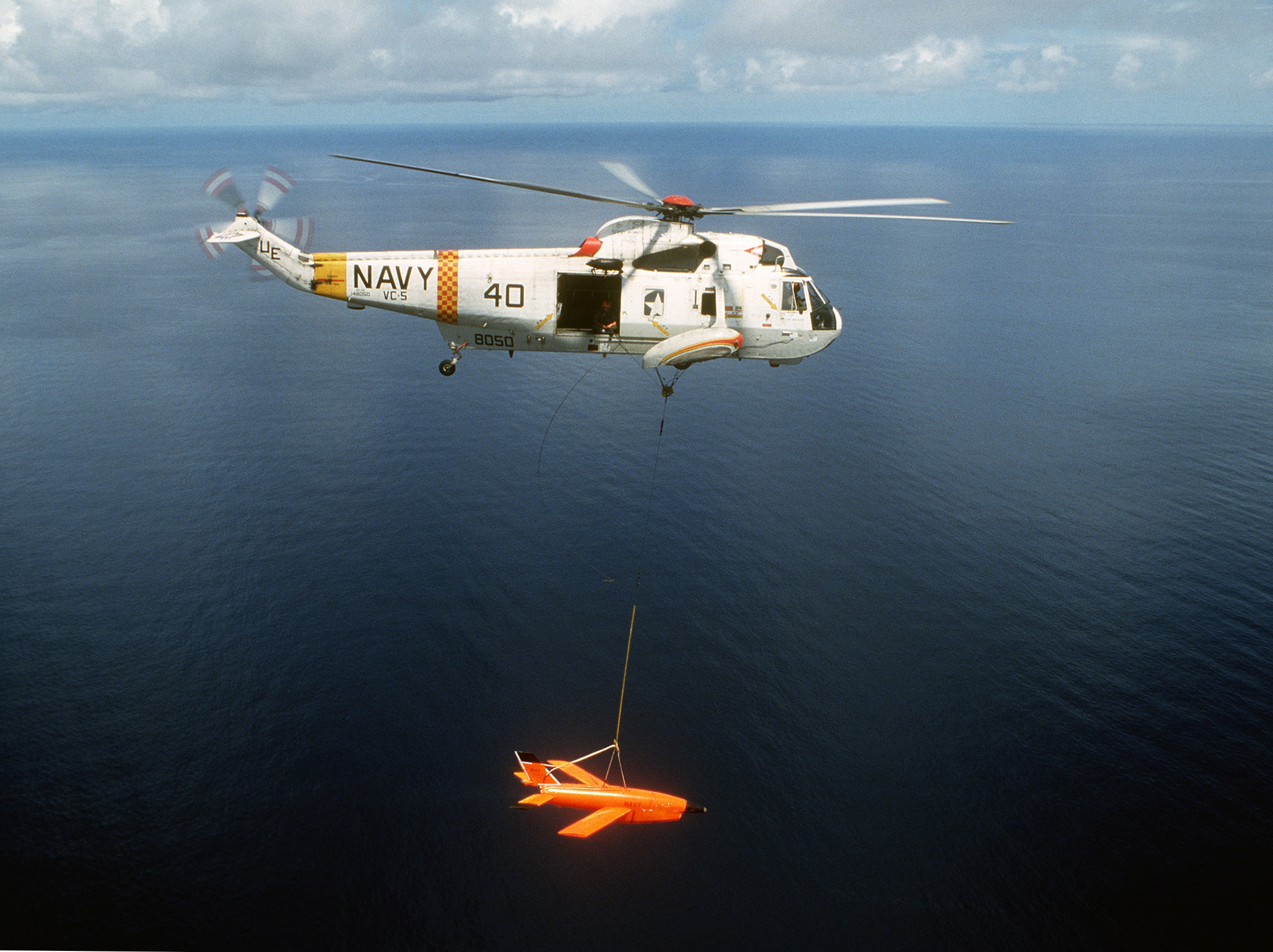
Sikorsky SH-3 Sea King helicopter recovering a BQM-34S Firebee drone

Meanwhile, the U.S. Navy upgraded the avionics in their BQM-34As, which were then designated BQM-34S. In the early 1980s the Navy also began to refit these with the uprated J69-T-41A engine of 1,920 lb_{f} (8.5 kN) thrust. The Air Force began to update their BQM-34As with improved avionics and also the J85-GE-7 engine which was fitted without major changes in the drone's airframe; the improved USAF variants retained their existing BQM-34A designation.

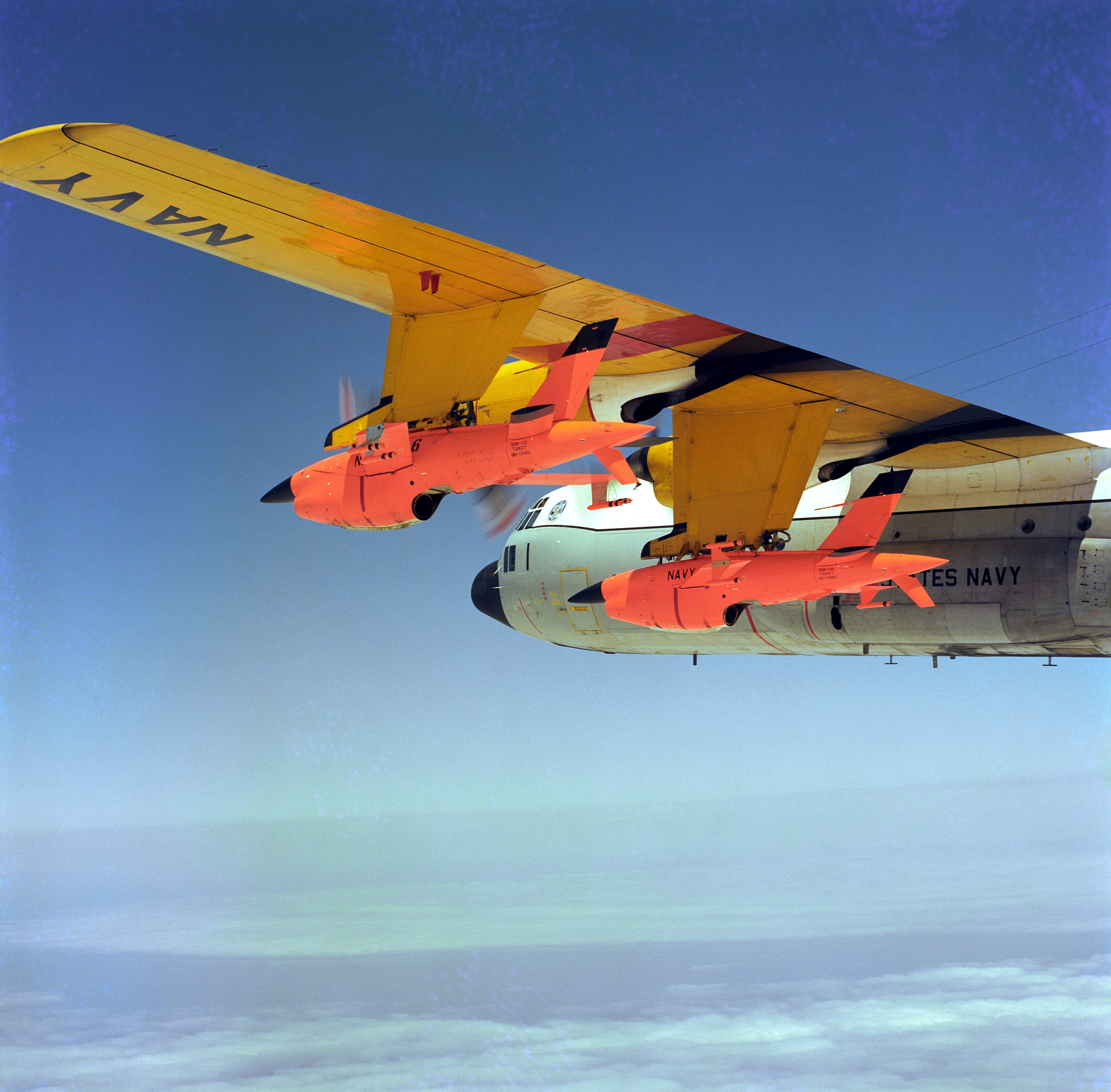
Lockheed DC-130 drone control aircraft carrying two BQM-34 Firebee target drones under its wing

BQM-34A production ended in 1982, but the production line was reopened in 1986 to produce more BQM-34S targets. Air Force and Navy Firebees have received further upgrades since that time, most refitted beginning in 1989 with the improved J85-GE-100 engine (also with 2,450 lb_{f} (10.9 kN) thrust) as well as modernized avionics. In the late 1990s some Firebees were also fitted with GPS navigation receivers.

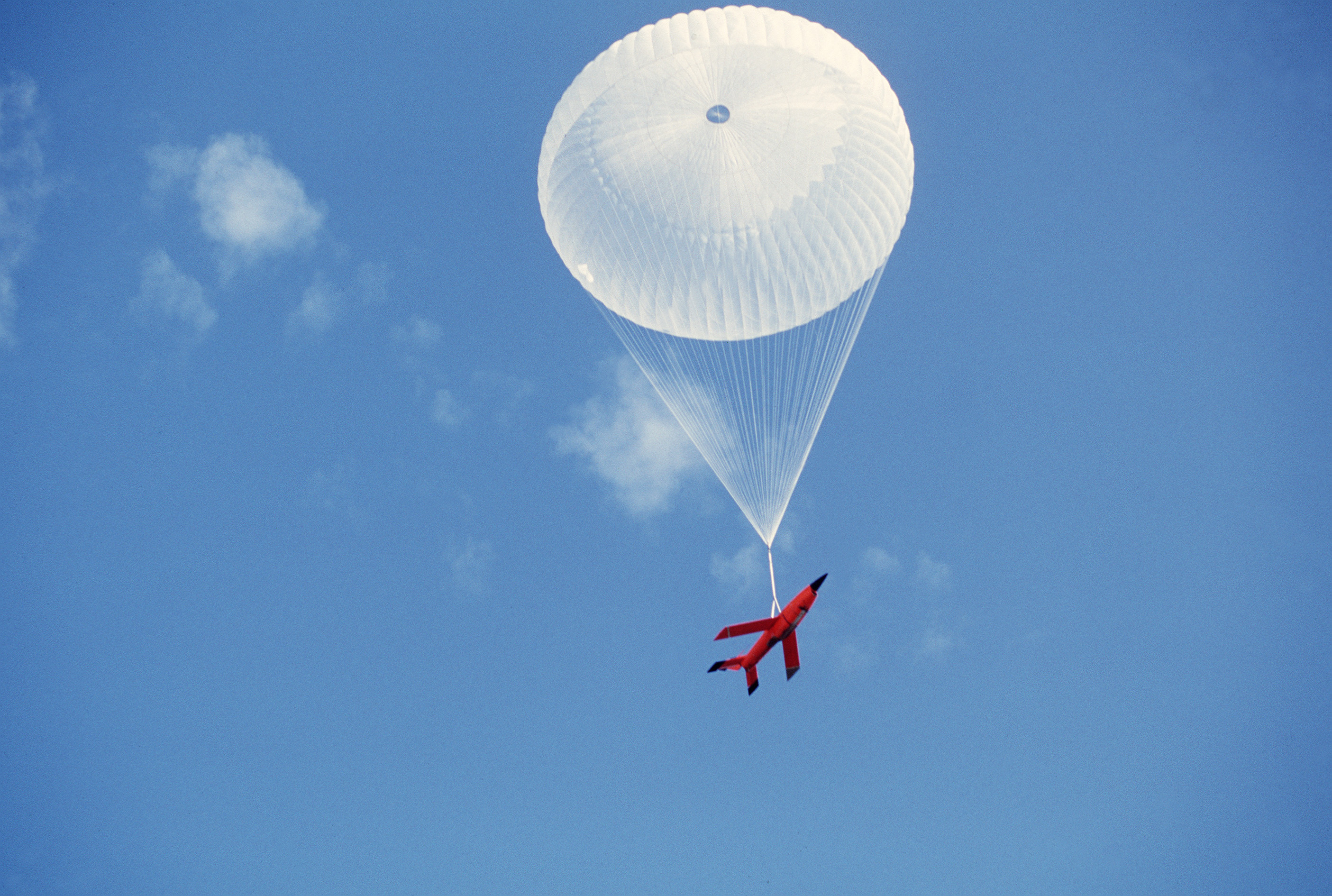
BQM-34A Firebee target drone returns to the ground by parachute, Tyndall AFB 1982

The Firebee's main air launch platform is the Lockheed DC-130 drone controller aircraft, which can carry four drones on underwing pylons. The Firebee is typically snatched out of the air by a recovery aircraft that sweeps up the drone's parachute, simplifying recovery and reducing damage to the target from ground impact. During early test flights, the Fairchild C-119 was used for this purpose, while on operational flights the Sikorsky SH-3 Sea King was the primary recovery platform. The drone can float for an extended period of time if it ditches in water.

The target drone can be fitted with various control systems, some that give it fighter-like maneuverability. It is also equipped with scoring and countermeasures systems, radar enhancement devices to allow it to emulate a wide range of combat aircraft, and wingtip thermal flares which cause heat-seeking missiles to aim for wing tips rather than the engine exhaust, sparing the target. It can also tow a target sleeve or other types of towed targets.

=== Ryan Firebee II ===
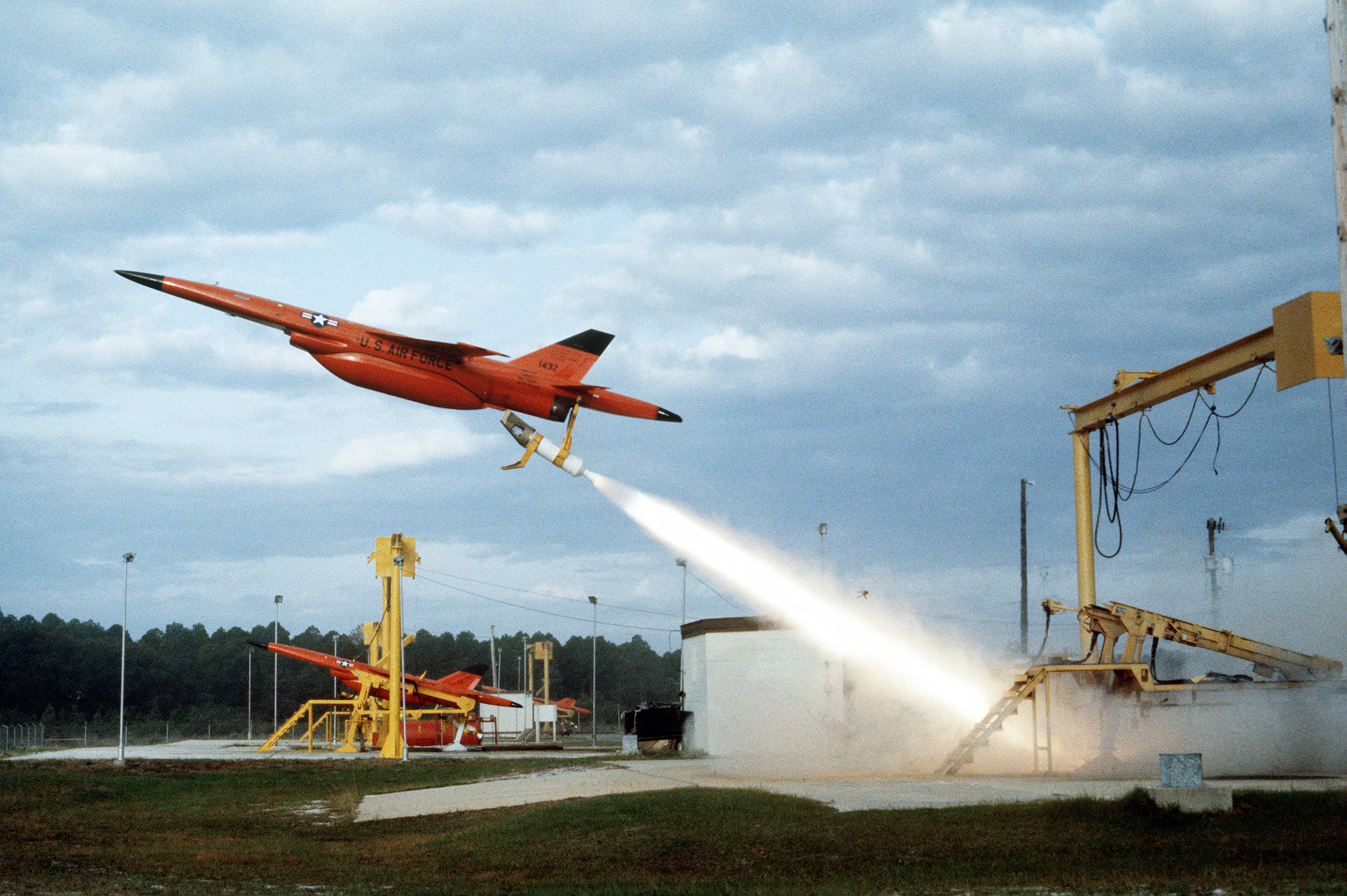
BQM-34F Firebee II RATO launch, Tyndall AFB 1982

Teledyne Ryan also developed a third-generation Model 166 Firebee II with supersonic performance, with the U.S. Navy awarding a development contract to the company in 1965. Initial flight was in 1968. Although its external appearance was substantially different from that of the original Firebee, the Firebee II used the same engine and control systems, and confusingly retained the BQM-34 designation. The Navy version was the BQM-34E, while the Air Force version was the BQM-34F.

The Air Force BQM-34F was slightly heavier, with an additional parachute for midair recovery by helicopter snatch. The Navy BQM-34E was updated with improved avionics in the mid-1970s, with the upgrade redesignated BQM-34T.

The Firebee II was a sleek dart of an aircraft with swept tailplane and swept mid-body wings. It was powered by a Teledyne CAE J69-T-6 turbojet with 1,840 lb_{f} (8.2 kN) thrust, with the intake on the belly forward of the wings and the exhaust under the tailfins. Internal fuel capacity was small, but the target could be fitted with a conformal external tank that was dropped before boosting to supersonic speeds. Flight operations were performed much as they are for the Firebee I, with launch from a DC-130. It was also ground launched using RATO for use as a target. It had a maximum speed of Mach 1.5, dashing for 4 minutes at 60,000 feet (18,000 m) and had a subsonic endurance of 75 minutes, giving it a range of approximately 570 miles (920 km).

In all 286 Firebee IIs were built, a tiny quantity compared to the number of Firebee Is manufactured. The Firebee II is now out of service, while the Firebee I continues in operation and has been in service for over 50 years, making it one of the longest-lived aircraft in the U.S. military inventory.

=== Fire Fly and Lightning Bug ===
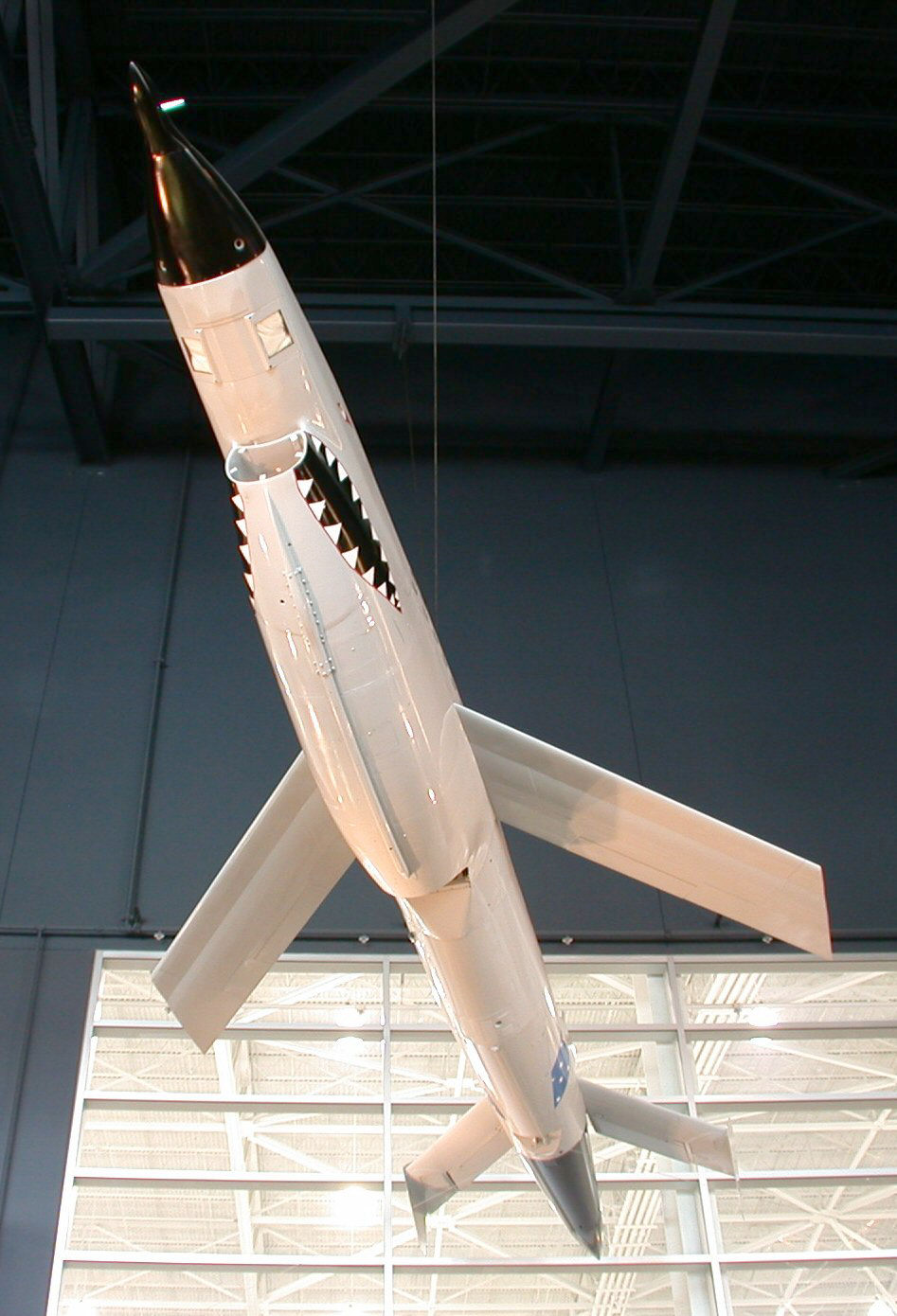
Ryan Model 147 "Lightning Bug" low-altitude reconnaissance drone (AQM-34L) at the Strategic Air Command & Aerospace Museum

The Firebee target vehicle's success led to Ryan being asked to develop a reconnaissance version, which became the highly successful Model 147 Fire Fly and Lightning Bug series; these saw extensive service in the Vietnam War.

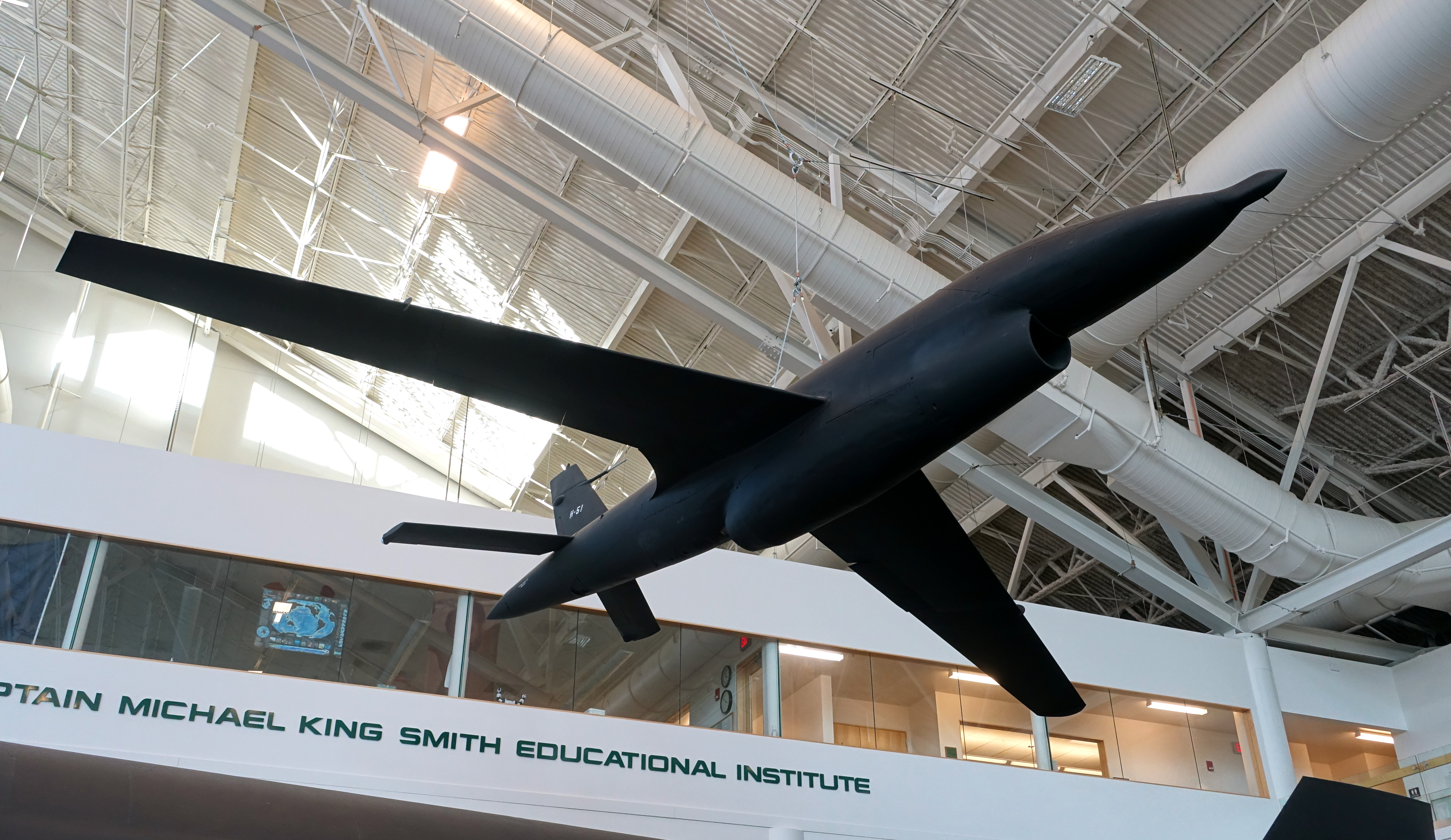
AQM-34N (Ryan Model 147H) high-altitude reconnaissance RPV (USAF S/N 67–21596) manufactured by Ryan Aeronautical in late 1967, restored for preservation at the Evergreen Aviation & Space Museum, McMinnville, Oregon

=== Modern use ===
The Firebee target drone has proven successful and remains in operation with the U.S. Navy and Air Force. Firebees have also served with the Canadian Armed Forces and Japan Self-Defense Forces, with Japanese Firebees built by Fuji Heavy Industries. A small number were also supplied to NATO programs. More than 7,000 Firebees have been built, with 1,280 of these being first generation variants.

In the late 1990s Teledyne Ryan, using company funds, configured two Firebees with cameras and communications electronics to provide real-time intelligence for battlefield target acquisition and damage assessment. These two UAVs, named Argus, were used in a USAF "Green Flag" exercise to relay images in real time from the test range in Nevada to stations in Florida.

Five BQM-34-53 Extended Range Firebees were also used to lay chaff corridors during the 2003 invasion of Iraq. The drones were modernized by Northrop Grumman in a fast-response program earlier that year, being fitted with chaff dispensers and other improvements including GPS-based programmable waypoint guidance systems (which may or not have been added by the upgrade program). These Firebees were delivered for service in charcoal-black paint schemes. Only one DC-130 drone launcher aircraft remained in the U.S. military's inventory at the time and was not immediately operational due to a malfunction. Two Firebees were ground-launched on the first night of the operation; the other three were air-launched by the DC-130 on the second night of the operation. The drones flew until they ran out of fuel and crashed. Iraqi TV broadcast footage of the wrecks while describing them as piloted aircraft.

The last Firebee was delivered in 2002.

== Operators ==
Canada
Israel
Japan
United States

== Specifications (BQM-34A) ==
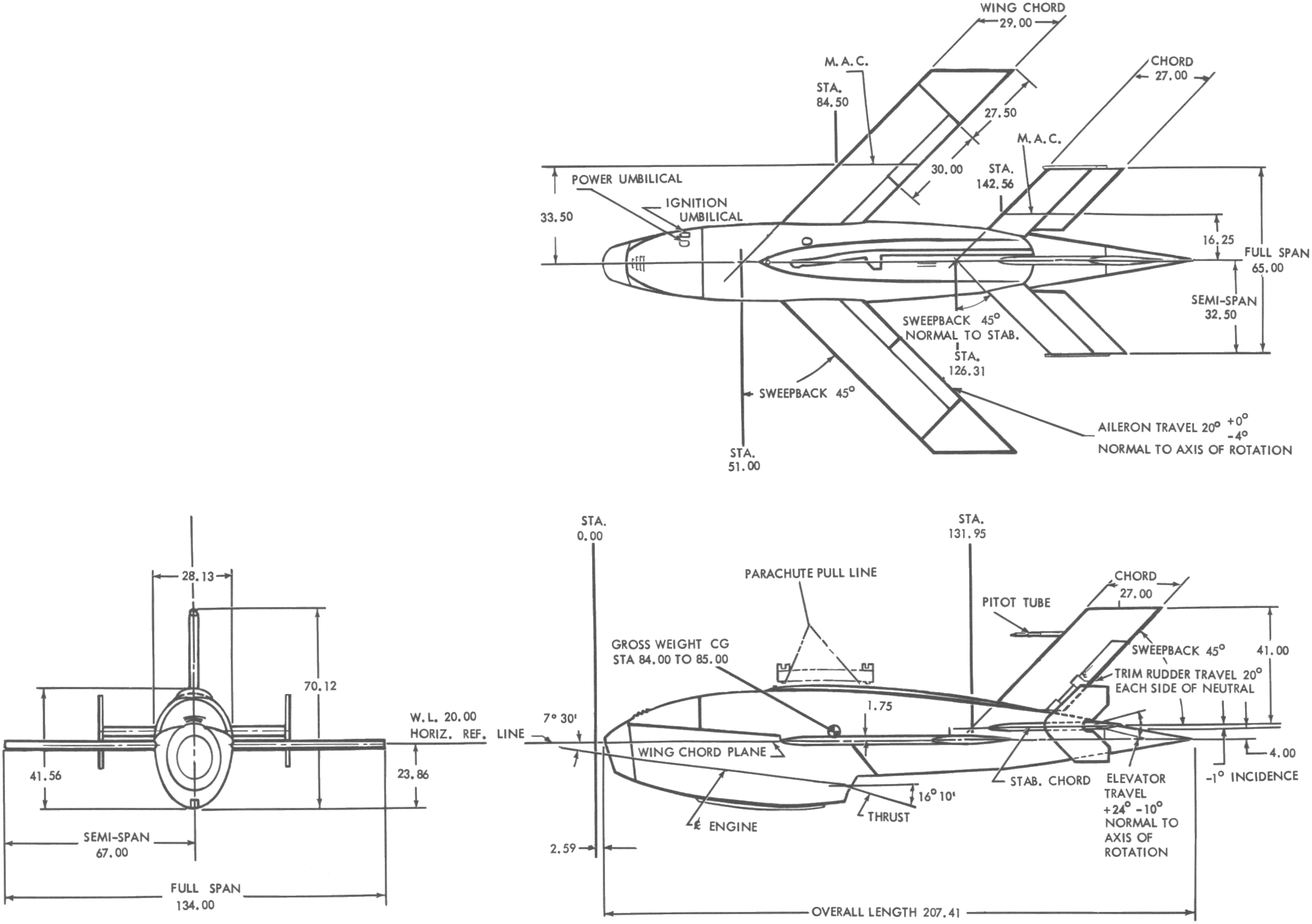
3-view line drawing of the Ryan Q-2A Firebee

Data from Jane's All The World's Aircraft 1982–83

General characteristics

- Crew: None
- Length: 21 ft 11 in (6.68 m)
- Wingspan: 12 ft 11 in (3.93 m)
- Height: 6 ft 8 in (2.04 m)
- Wing area: 36.0 sq ft (3.34 m^{2})
- Empty weight: 1,500 lb (680 kg)
- Gross weight: 2,060 lb (934 kg)
- Max takeoff weight: 2,500 lb (1,134 kg)
- Powerplant: 1 × Continental J69-T-29A turbojet, 1,700 lbf (7.6 kN) thrust

Performance

- Maximum speed: 690 mph (1,110 km/h, 600 kn) at 6,500 ft (2,000 m)
- Cruise speed: 630 mph (1,010 km/h, 550 kn) at 50,000 ft (15,000 m)
- Stall speed: 116 mph (187 km/h, 101 kn)
- Never exceed speed: 731 mph (1,176 km/h, 635 kn) at 50,000 ft (15,000 m)
- Range: 796 mi (1,281 km, 692 nmi)
- Endurance: 75 min 30 s
- Service ceiling: 60,000 ft (18,000 m) +
- Rate of climb: 16,000 ft/min (81 m/s)

== See also ==
- Tupolev Tu-143
