= Teledyne CAE J69 =

Turbojet aircraft engine series

J69 / J100
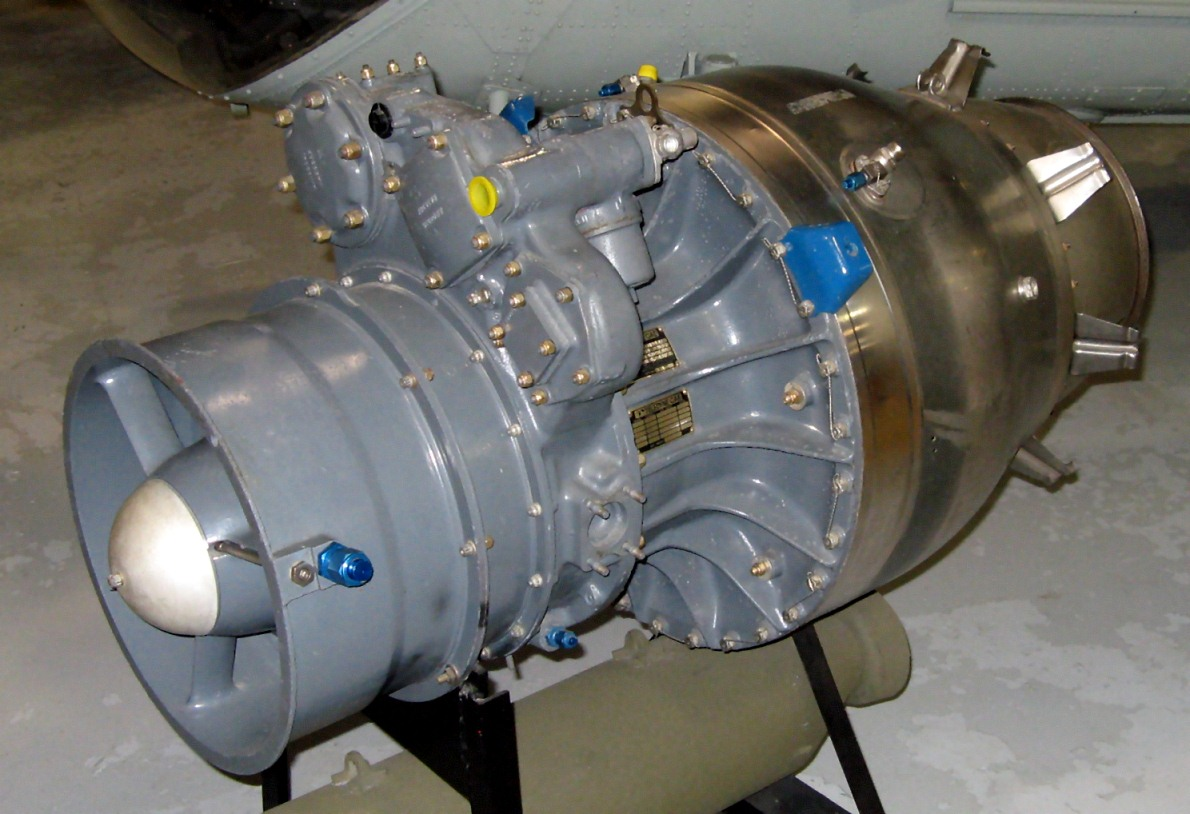
- Teledyne-Continental J69 turbojet at the Museum of Aviation, Warner Robins, Georgia
- Type: Turbojet
- National origin: France/United States
- Manufacturer: Continental Aviation and Engineering / Teledyne CAE
- Major applications: BQM-34 Firebee; T-37 Tweet; Ryan Model 147
- Developed from: Turbomeca Marboré

The Teledyne CAE J69 was a small turbojet engine originally produced by Continental Aviation and Engineering (CAE) under license from Turbomeca. The J69 was a development of the Turbomeca Marboré II. It powered a number of U.S. drones, missiles and small aircraft. The engine was later produced by Teledyne CAE. The J69 was also developed into the Teledyne CAE J100 turbojet optimized for operation at higher altitudes.

== Variants ==
Data from Aircraft engines of the World 1957

J69-T-1
(Marboré I) 660 lbf (2.9 kN) at 23,000 rpm.

J69-T-3
880 lbf (3.9 kN) at 22,500 rpm for take-off.
J69-T-6
J69-T-9
J69-T-17
J69-T-19
J69-T-19A
J69-T-19B
J69-T-23
J69-T-25
J69-T-27
J69-T-29
J69-T-31
J69-T-33
J69-T-39
J69-T-41
J69-T-41A
J69-T-406
J100-CA-100
2,800 lbf (12 kN) thrust
CJ69-1025
1,025 lbf (4.56 kN)
CJ69-1400
1,400 lbf (6.2 kN) lb thrust
Model 352
Model 352A
Model 352-5a
(CJ69-T-1025) 1,025 lbf (4.56 kN) thrust
Model 354-12
(J69-T-27) 1,150 lbf (5.1 kN) thrust
Model 356-7A
(J69-T-29) 1,705 lbf (7.58 kN) thrust
Model 356-7D
(J69-T-29) 1,700 lbf (7.6 kN) thrust
Model 356-8
(J69-T-31) 1,025 lbf (4.56 kN) thrust
Model 356-11
(J69-T-33) 1,025 lbf (4.56 kN) thrust
Model 356-16
Model 356-24
Model 356-27B
Model 356-29A
(J69-T-41A)

== Applications ==
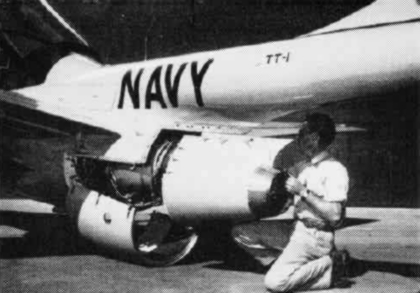
The J69 of a TT-1 Pinto

J69

- Avro Canada VZ-9 Avrocar
- Cessna T-37 Tweet
- Dale Weejet 800
- Radioplane Q-1
- Ryan BQM-34 Firebee
- Temco TT Pinto

J100

- Ryan Model 147T

== Specifications (Marboré IIC) ==
Data from FAA Type Certificate Data Sheet

==== General characteristics ====
- Type: turbojet
- Length: 61.7 in (1,570 mm)
- Diameter: 24.9 in (630 mm)
- Dry weight: 358 lb (162 kg)

==== Components ====
- Compressor: single stage centrifugal
- Combustors: single annular combustion chamber
- Turbine: single stage

==== Performance ====
- Maximum thrust: 880 lbf (3.9 kN) at 22,600 rpm
- Turbine inlet temperature: 650 °C (1,202 °F)
- Thrust-to-weight ratio: 2.458

== See also ==
Related development

- Turbomeca Marboré

Related lists

- List of aircraft engines
