= 15th Reconnaissance Squadron (disambiguation) =

The 15th Reconnaissance Squadron is an active United States Air Force Unit, originally constituted as the 2d Aviation School Squadron in May 1917. It has held this designation since August 1997.

15th Reconnaissance Squadron may also refer to:

- 405th Tactical Missile Squadron, designated the 15th Reconnaissance Squadron (Medium) from January 1941 to April 1942
- 556th Test and Evaluation Squadron, designated the 15th Reconnaissance Squadron (Photographic) from May 1947 to December 1947

== See also ==
- 15th Photographic Reconnaissance Squadron
- 15th Tactical Reconnaissance Squadron
