= 556th Test and Evaluation Squadron =

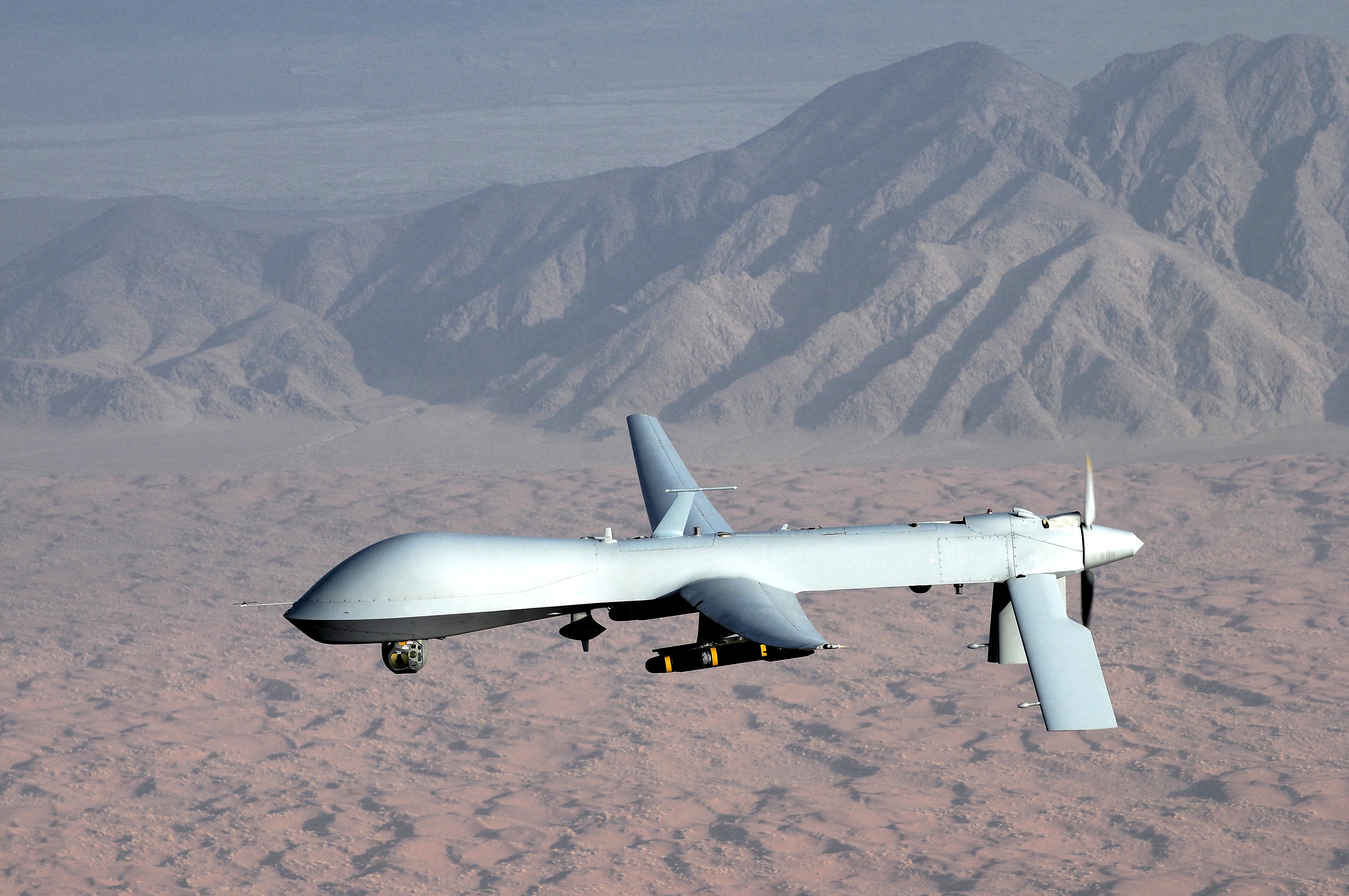
- MQ-1 Predator as operated by the squadron
- Active: 1942–1945; 1947; 1968–1972; 2008–present
- Country: United States
- Branch: United States Air Force
- Type: Test/Evaluation
- Engagements: Mediterranean Theater of Operations
- Decorations: Distinguished Unit Citation; Air Force Outstanding Unit Award; Vietnamese Cross of Gallantry with Palm

Insignia
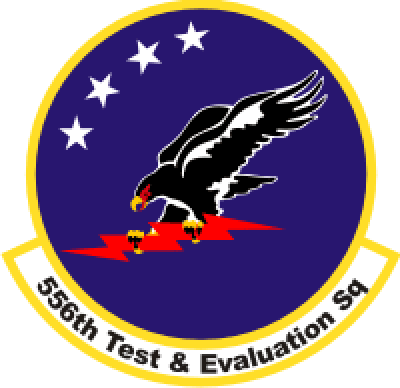
- 556th Test & Evaluation Squadron emblem

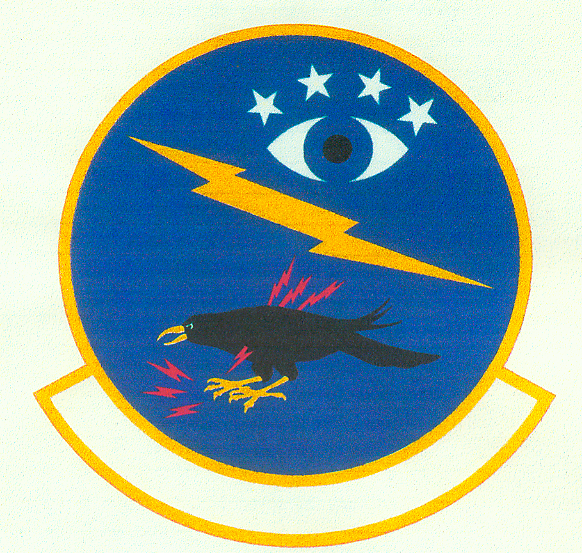
- 556th Reconnaissance Squadron emblem (approved 14 August 1969)

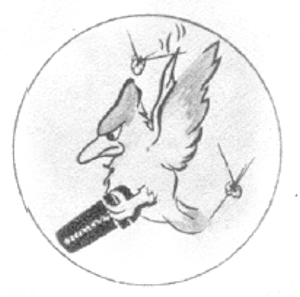
- 15th Photographic Reconnaissance Squadron Emblem (approved 21 February 1945)

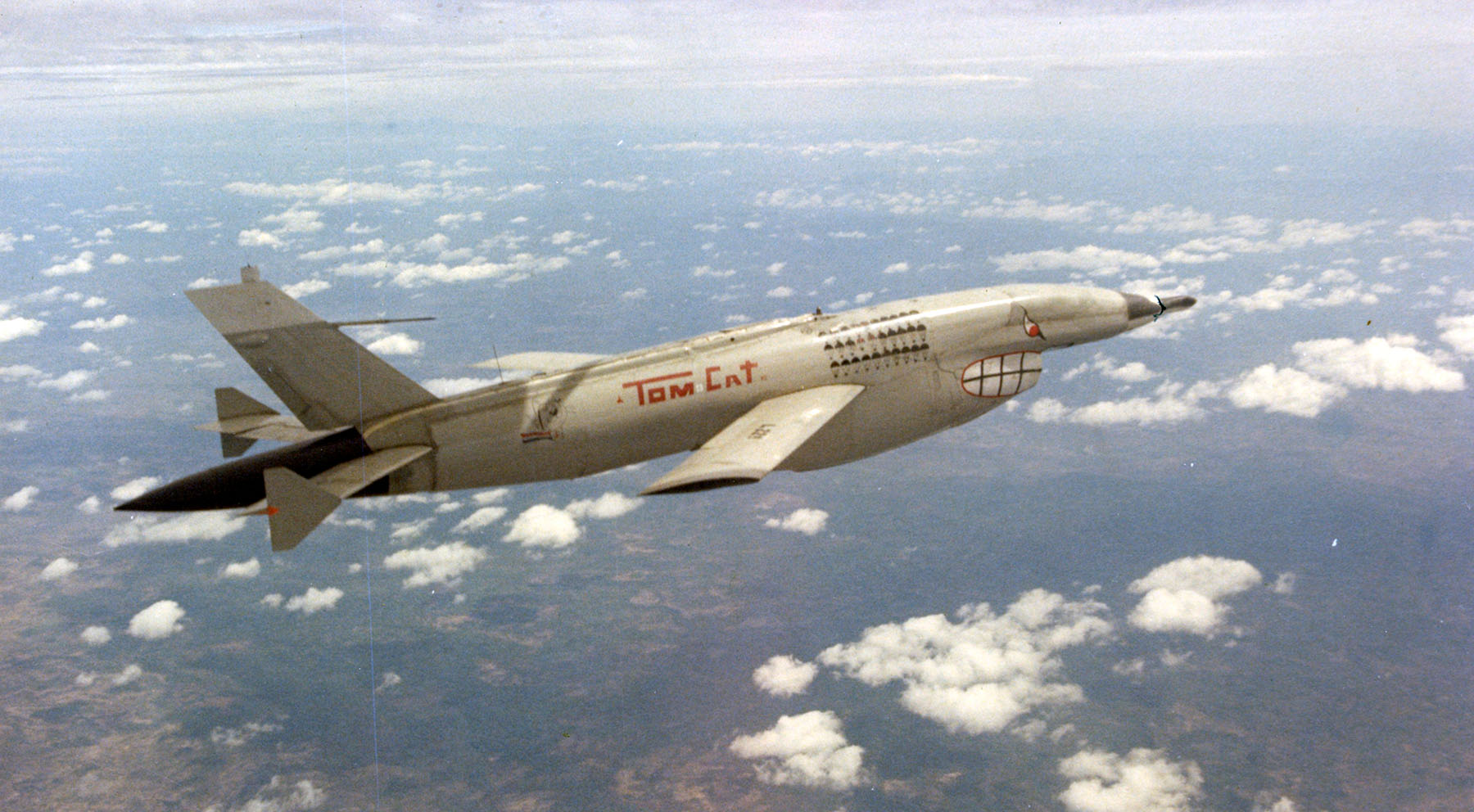
556th Reconnaissance Squadron AQM-34L Compass Bin drone

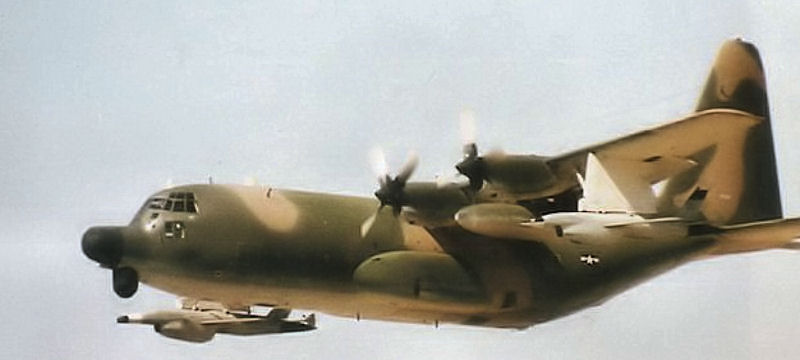
DC-130 carrying AQM-34 drones during the Vietnam War

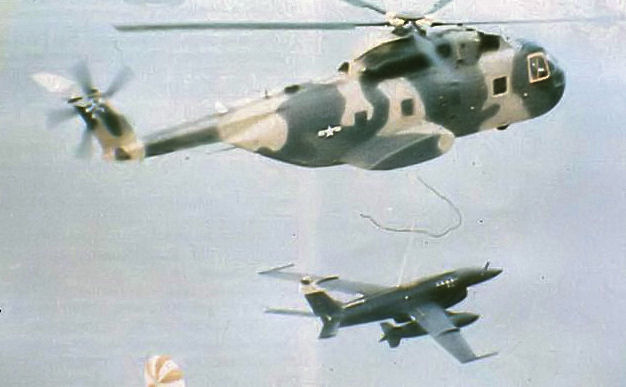
Sikorsky CH-3E inflight capture of a 556th Reconnaissance Squadron AQM-34R Combat Dawn drone

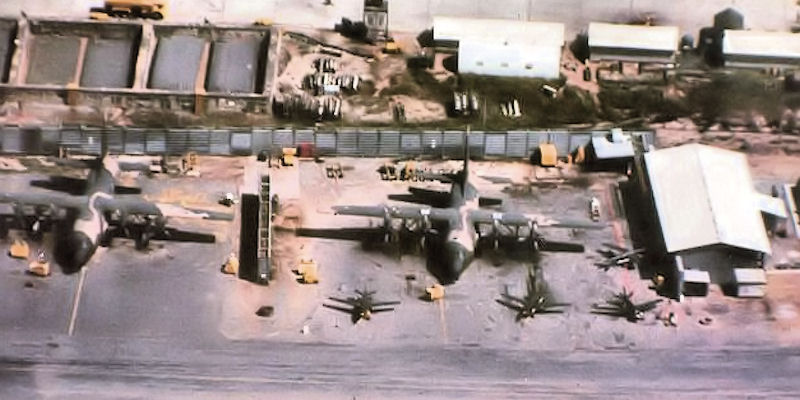
556th Reconnaissance Squadron revetments at Bien Hoa AB, South Vietnam. C-130s and AQM-34 drones visible

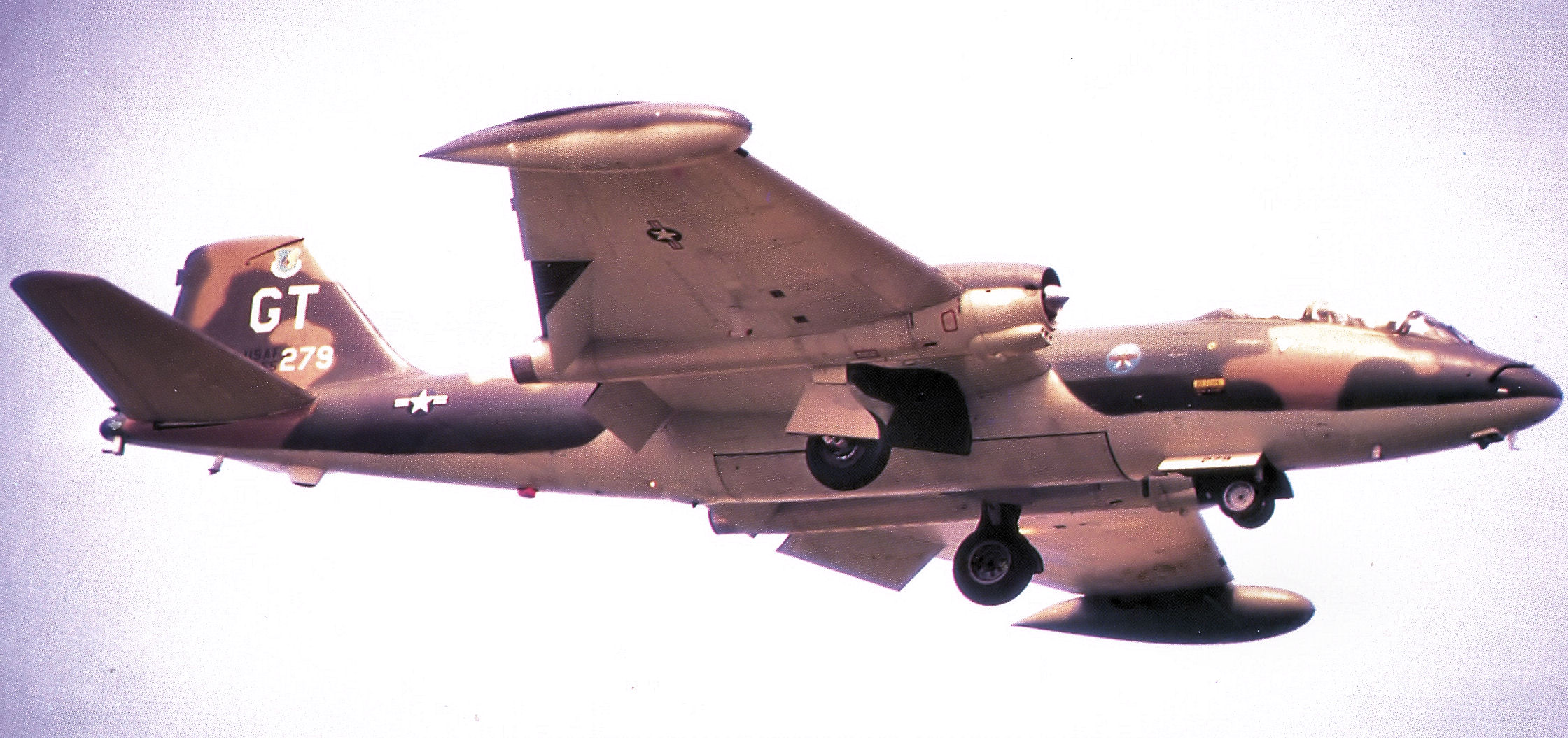
EB-57E-MA 55-4279 of 556th Reconnaissance Squadron, Kadena AB 1970

The 556th Test and Evaluation Squadron is a United States Air Force unit. It is assigned to the 53d Test and Evaluation Group at Creech Air Force Base, Nevada, and conducts unmanned aircraft testing.

== Mission ==
The 556th Test and Evaluation Squadron is the Air Force's first operational test squadron for unmanned aircraft. It provides support to UAS operations worldwide, through force development evaluations, the development of training, tactics and procedures, systems expertise and meeting warfighters' urgent need requests.

== History ==
The 556th designation was reactivated by Air Combat Command for its current mission due to its lineage and long history of surveillance and intelligence-gathering.

=== World War II ===
The squadron was constituted on 9 June 1942 as the 15th Photographic Mapping Squadron and activated on 20 June at Colorado Springs Army Air Base. Components of the squadron deployed to England for combat training by the Royal Air Force, while the remainder of squadron received aircraft and ground training in Oklahoma.

Deployed to Algeria in early December 1942 as part of Operation Torch invasion forces, the squadron became the main source of aerial intelligence for Twelfth Air Force in the North African Campaign. It supported United States Fifth Army in its drive across Algeria and during the Tunisian Campaign during 1942 and 1943. The 15th flew air reconnaissance and mapping missions over Sicily and Southern Italy prior to Allied invasions during 1943. On 6 February 1943, it was redesignated as the 15th Photographic Squadron (Heavy).

It was reassigned to Fifteenth Air Force in December 1943, flying numerous long distance reconnaissance flights over the Balkans, Occupied Europe and Germany, photographing targets for later attack by Fifteenth Air Force and Twelfth Air Force bombers. The squadron obtained intelligence about enemy fortifications, armored units, infantry concentrations and other tactical intelligence. These flights were extremely hazardous, being flown without escort and in unarmed aircraft. On 21 January 1944 it became a combat mapping squadron with the same number, but was again renamed the 15th Photographic Reconnaissance Squadron on 31 August. After the surrender of Germany, the unit gradually demobilized and was inactivated in Italy on 28 October 1945.

==== Postwar ====
On 29 April 1947, the squadron became the 15th Reconnaissance Squadron (Photographic), and was reactivated on 19 May 1947 at Langley Field with the 67th Reconnaissance Group of Tactical Air Command, operating the F-6 Mustang, a photo reconnaissance variant of the famed P-51 Mustang fighter. After transferring to the 10th Reconnaissance Group on 24 July, it moved to Lawson Field on 8 September and to Pope Field on 1 October. Due to funding and manpower shortages, the squadron was inactivated on 3 December, and its equipment and personnel were merged into the senior 15th Tactical Reconnaissance Squadron.

=== 556th Reconnaissance Squadron ===
In 1968 the unit was reorganized as the 556th Reconnaissance Squadron, being formed from the equipment and personnel of the :: Assuming personnel and equipment of 6091st Reconnaissance Squadron and placed under the PACAF 347th Tactical Fighter Wing at Yokota Air Base, Japan. The squadron, however operated in a deployed status from Bien Hoa Air Base, South Vietnam.

All the drones were carried and started from specially modified GC-130As, MC-130AS and – finally – DC-130A and DC-130E control aircraft, each equipped with systems for carriage, start, control and guidance of drones. The drones were always pre-programmed, but after release their progress was monitored and the drone controller could override the programme manually if necessary. The carrier aircraft had a console for two controller pilots equipped with all the usual flight instruments, which read the data sent to them from the drone. All data about the navigation, planned route, actual flight pad and position of the drone, and the carrier aircraft were fed into a single system which showed them on one display. On their return the drones deployed a parachute and were snared by specially modified CH-3E recovery helicopters.

From 1969, first serious encounters with North Vietnamese MiG-17 and MiG-21 interceptors followed. In 1969 alone, North Vietnamese fighters – primarily MiG-21s – were scrambled no less than 540 times in order to intercept drones, claiming to have shot down ten AQM-34s. NVAF MiGs did score 6 kills, and some were scored indirectly by Americans. In May 1970, an AQM-34L photo reconnaissance drone was on a mission over Hanoi area, acting as a manned reconnaissance aircraft. Finishing its photo run, the drone turned toward the Tonkin Gulf where it was to ditch after expending its fuel. Almost everything was going according to plan, down to one detail: the drone was intercepted by an MiG-21. The fighter closed and tried to shoot it down by two K-13/AA-2 Atoll air-to-air missiles. Both malfunctioned however, and the Vietnamese continued the pursuit, trying to down the drone by tackling its wing. By doing so, the NVAF pilot forgot to control his fuel reserves: after the drone fell harmlessly into the sea, his aircraft ran out of fuel. The NVAF pilot ejected while flying back toward the coast. This was the first air-to-air kill scored by an unmanned aircraft in the history of air warfare.

In addition to the drone operations, the squadron received significant amounts of intelligence operating an RB-57F Canberra from Yokota, detached from the MAC 9th Weather Reconnaissance Wing at McClellan Air Force Base, California. The RB-57 provided very high altitude intelligence with regards to SA-2 locations for mission planning with the AQM-34 low altitude reconnaissance drones.

As part of the drawdown of United States forces from South Vietnam the 556th was officially moved to Yokota Air Base, Japan in 1971, although limited operations continued from Bien Hoa until 30 Jun 1972 when the squadron was inactivated.

=== Unmanned aircraft test squadron ===
The 556th was redesignated as a test and evaluation squadron on 16 January 2008, and reactivated on 15 February with 53d Test and Evaluation Group at Creech Air Force Base, Nevada, under the command of Lieutenant Colonel Ty Moyers. The squadron was formed using the personnel and equipment of the inactivated Detachment 4 of the 53d Group, and was the first USAF Unmanned aircraft systems (UAS) operational test squadron. It was to support UAS operations by providing force development evaluations and developing training, tactics, and procedures for the unmanned aircraft. The 556th received three new General Atomics MQ-1 Predator drones upon activation and was scheduled to receive another MQ-1 by the end of the year and four General Atomics MQ-9 Reaper drones beginning in 2010.

== Lineage ==
15th Reconnaissance Squadron

- Constituted as the 15th Photographic Mapping Squadron on 9 June 1942

Activated on 20 June 1942
Redesignated: 15th Photographic Squadron (Heavy) on 6 February 1943
Redesignated: 15th Combat Mapping Squadron on 21 January 1944
Redesignated: 15th Photographic Reconnaissance Squadron on 31 August 1944
Inactivated on 28 October 1945

- Redesignated 15th Reconnaissance Squadron (Photographic) on 29 April 1947

Activated on 19 May 1947
Inactivated on 3 December 1947

- Disbanded on 8 October 1948
- Consolidated with the 556th Reconnaissance Squadron on 19 September 1985

556th Test and Evaluation Squadron

- Constituted as the 556th Reconnaissance Squadron and activated on 15 May 1968 (not organized)

Organized on 1 July 1968
Inactivated on 30 June 1972

- Consolidated with the 15th Reconnaissance Squadron on 19 September 1985
- Consolidated unit designated 556th Tactical Intelligence Squadron but remained inactive
- Redesignated 556th Test and Evaluation Squadron on 16 January 2008

Activated on 15 February 2008.

=== Assignments ===
- 3d Photographic Group (later 3d Photographic Reconnaissance and Mapping Group, 3d Photographic Group), 20 June 1942

Attached to 5th Photographic Group from 21 November 1943

- 5th Photographic (later Reconnaissance) Group, 21 January 1944 – 28 October 1945
- 67th Reconnaissance Group, 19 May 1947
- 10th Reconnaissance Group, 24 July – 3 December 1947
- 347th Tactical Fighter Wing, 1 July 1968
- 6100st Air Base Wing, 15 May 1971
- 475th Air Base Wing, 1 November 1971 – 30 June 1972
- 53d Test and Evaluation Group, 15 February 2008 – present

=== Stations ===
- Colorado Springs Army Air Base, Colorado, 20 June – 13 August 1942
- RAF Membury (AAF-466), England, 7 September 1942
- RAF Steeple Morden (AAF-122), England, 27 October – 21 November 1942
- Oran Es Sénia Airport, Algeria, 6 December 1942

A flight of air echelon arrived at Oran Tafraoui Airport, Algeria, 18 November 1942, and moved to Maison Blanche Airport, Algeria, 27 November 1942
B and C flights of air echelon at Colorado Springs Army Air Base until 12 October 1943 and afterward at Will Rogers Field, Oklahoma, until 21 January 1944

- Maison Blanche Airport, Algeria, 25 December 1942
- Constantine Airfield, Algeria, 5 June 1943
- La Marsa Airfield, Tunisia, 28 June 1943

Detachment operated from Constantine Airfield, Algeria, until 14 July 1943
Detachment operated from Grottaglie Airfield, Italy, after 4 October 1943

- Grottaglie Airfield, Italy, November 1943
- Bari Airfield, Italy, 28 December 1943 – October 1945
- Camp Kilmer, New Jersey, 26–28 October 1945
- Langley Field, Virginia, 19 May 1947
- Lawson Field, Georgia, 8 September 1947; 8 September 1947
- Pope Field, North Carolina, 1 October – 3 December 1947.
- Yokota Air BAW, Japan, 1 July 1968 – 30 June 1972

Continued operations from Bien Hoa Air Base, South Vietnam until 30 October 1971
Operated from undisclosed locations until 30 June 1972

- Creech Air Force Base, Nevada, 15 February 2008 – present

=== Aircraft ===
- B-17 Flying Fortress, 1942–1944
- P-38/F-4 Lightning, 1942–1943
- P-38/F-5 Lightning, 1943–1945
- Potez 540 (Captured from Vichy French Air Force), 1943
- B-25 Mitchell, 1943–1944
- P-51D/F-6D Mustang, 1947.
- C-130B-II Hercules, 1968–1972
- GC-130A, MC-130A, DC-130A and DC-130E Hercules, 1968–1972
- AQM-34, 1968–1972
- RB-57F Canberra, 1968–1972
