= Ryan Model 147 =

Jet-powered drone

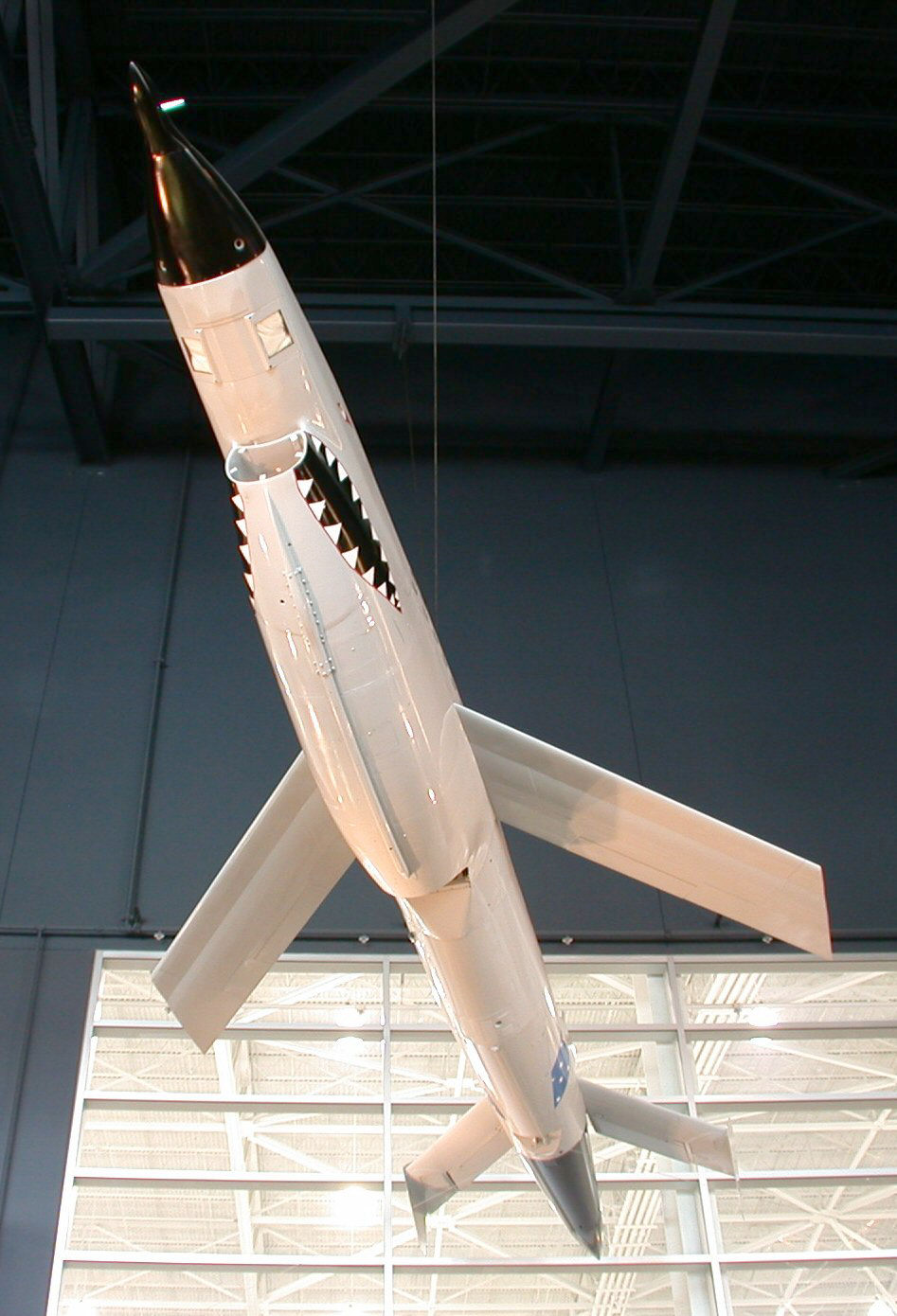
- Ryan Model 147 "Lightning Bug" low-altitude reconnaissance drone (AQM-34L) at the Strategic Air Command & Aerospace Museum

General information
- Type: Unmanned aerial vehicle
- Manufacturer: Ryan Aeronautical
- Primary users: United States Air Force United States Navy

History
- First flight: 1962
- Developed from: Ryan Firebee

The Ryan Model 147 Lightning Bug is a jet-powered drone, or unmanned aerial vehicle, produced and developed by Ryan Aeronautical from the earlier Ryan Firebee target drone series.

Beginning in 1962, the Model 147 was introduced as a reconnaissance RPV (Remotely Piloted Vehicle, nomenclature of that era) for a United States Air Force project named Fire Fly. Over the next decade – assisted with secret funding from the recently formed National Reconnaissance Office along with support of the Strategic Air Command and Ryan Aeronautical's own resources – the basic Model 147 design would be developed into a diverse series of variants configured for a wide array of mission-specific roles, with multiple new systems, sensors and payloads used, modified and improved upon during the operational deployment of these drones in Southeast Asia. Missions performed by the Model 147 series RPVs included high and low-altitude photographic and electronic aerial reconnaissance, surveillance, decoy, electronic warfare, signals intelligence, and psychological warfare.

The Ryan drones were designed without landing gear for simplicity and to save weight. Like its Firebee predecessor, the Model 147 could either be air-launched from a larger carrier aircraft or launched from the ground using a solid rocket booster; at completion of its mission the drone deployed its own recovery parachute which could be snatched in mid-air by a recovery helicopter (in a combat environment it was naturally not desired to recover the drone on, from or near enemy territory and ground or water impact could also cause damage to or loss of the drone or its payload).

At the end of the Vietnam War in 1975 the U.S. military's available funding and need for combat drones severely declined, even as Teledyne Ryan introduced further advanced developments of the Model 147 series such as the BGM-34 strike and defense suppression RPVs. Costs of maintaining the Lightning Bugs at full readiness could no longer be justified. Only by the 1990s did substantial interest, organization and funding again emerge from the U.S. Air Force and intelligence agencies to develop, acquire and widely deploy combat UAVs.

== Development ==
=== Ryan Model 136 Red Wagon and Lucy Lee ===
In 1959, Ryan Aeronautical performed a study to investigate how the company's Firebee target drone could be used for long-range reconnaissance missions. Ryan engineers concluded they could increase the Firebee's range to allow it to fly south over the Soviet Union after launch from the Barents Sea, with recovery in Turkey. The Firebee has a low radar cross-section, making it hard to detect. With lengthened wings, the drone would also be able to fly at high altitude, further increasing its elusiveness. It could be launched by a Lockheed DC-130, or JATO-boosted from a land site or ship.

Ryan presented its report on the studies to the U.S. Air Force in mid-April 1960. On 1 May 1960 an American Lockheed U-2 spy plane was shot down over the USSR and its pilot, Francis Gary Powers, captured. On 1 July a Boeing RB-47H reconnaissance aircraft flying an electronic intelligence mission in international airspace near the Soviet border was shot down; four of its crew were killed and the other two captured. A few days later, the Air Force awarded Ryan a US$200,000 contract to perform further studies.

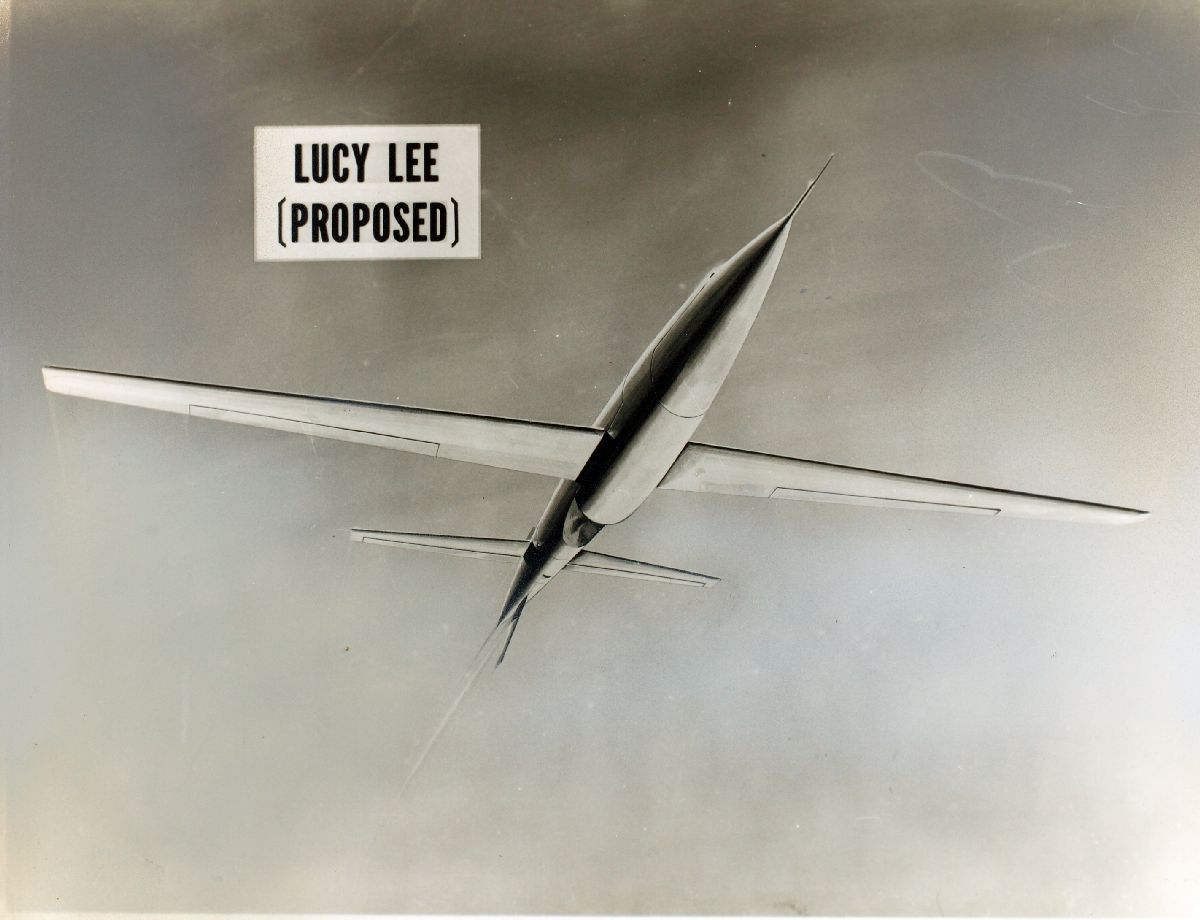
Ryan Aeronautical company artist's concept rendering of the "Lucy Lee" high-altitude reconnaissance drone proposal, circa 1961

Ryan conducted radar measurements on sub-scale Firebee models and determined that their radar signature could be reduced by placing a wire screen over the jet intake, painting parts of the drone with non-conductive paint, and placing radar-absorbent material pads on both sides of the fuselage. Test flights of the modified Firebees were performed in September and October 1961. Flights were given a cover story, describing the drones as high-altitude targets for surface-to-air missiles (SAMs) in case one of them came down in a public area. The flights demonstrated that the modifications did not compromise the Firebee's performance.

Ryan actually wanted to build a completely new drone, the Ryan Model 136, for the reconnaissance mission. The Model 136, or Red Wagon, was optimized for the role with long straight wings for high-altitude flight, an engine set on the back of the fuselage to reduce its radar and infrared signatures as seen from below, and inward-canted twin tail fins to conceal the exhaust plume. The project stalled, however as the incoming Kennedy Administration was certain to reassess many military projects and Red Wagon was put on hold.

Ryan then proposed another drone project named "Lucy Lee" consisting of a highly modified Firebee intended to perform photographic and signals intelligence (SIGINT) reconnaissance from outside Soviet airspace. Lucy Lee seemed to be on track, but was then abruptly cancelled in January 1962.

=== Ryan Model 147A Fire Fly ===
Just as the whole idea of reconnaissance drones seemed to be completely dead, the USAF came to rescue the program. The Air Force selected the cheapest option, a reconnaissance drone based on a Firebee with minimal changes. A US$1.1 million contract was issued on 2 February 1962, requesting four Firebee drones modified for aerial reconnaissance. The modified Firebees were funded from a program named "Big Safari", established in the 1950s to fund fast-track conversions of existing aircraft for the reconnaissance mission. Big Safari would continue to work on reconnaissance drones during the Vietnam War, and would also assist UAV programs in later wars.

The new reconnaissance drones were designated Model 147A and codenamed Fire Fly. Specifications dictated a 1,200 miles (1,900 kilometres) range and a cruise altitude of 55,000 feet (17 km).

The first Model 147A was a standard Firebee with a new guidance system consisting of no more than a timer-programmer, a gyrocompass, and an altimeter. The Fire Fly could be programmed to fly in a certain direction at a certain altitude for a certain time, and then turn around and return the way it came. This aircraft was intended only as a demonstrator and to evaluate the new guidance system; it carried no cameras. Three test flights were performed in April 1962 and demonstrated the validity of the concept, with the drone performing a mission which ranged from New Mexico, north into Utah, and then back again with no guidance from the ground (though accompanied by a B-57 chase plane).

The second Model 147A had an 35-inch (89 cm) "plug" inserted into the fuselage to carry an additional 68 US gallons (258 litres) of fuel, increasing overall length from 22 feet (6.71 m) to 25 feet 9 inches (7.85 m). It also had a new nose containing a camera from the U-2. After four successful test flights performed in April and early May 1962, the third and fourth Model 147As (which were almost identical to the second example) were declared operational and deployed at Holloman Air Force Base in New Mexico with a Lockheed DC-130 Hercules launch aircraft.

Tests conducted that summer showed the drone was almost invisible to ground radar, and interceptors that were scrambled to find it ended up chasing each other. The only problem was that the drone generated a contrail, which gave it away. A "no-con" (no-contrail) program was initiated to fix the problem in subsequent variants, though apparently it wasn't fitted to the Model 147A. The system injected chlorosulfonic acid into the engine tailpipe when the drone entered hostile territory, creating tiny ice crystals which formed a transparent contrail. An effective system, although the chlorosulfonic acid was very corrosive which required use of high-grade stainless steel plumbing.

During the Cuban Missile Crisis a U-2 was shot down over Cuba on 27 October 1962 by an S-75 Dvina and its pilot killed. Afterwards the Model 147As were authorized for reconnaissance missions in place of the U-2. The drones were mounted under the wings of their DC-130 Hercules controller aircraft, its propellers turning, at ready on the runway when notification came from Air Force Chief of Staff Curtis LeMay that the mission was scrubbed. The U-2s were used for reconnaissance over Cuba instead, with missions resuming on 5 November 1962. LeMay wanted to reserve the Fire Fly for later.

=== Ryan Model 147B, 147C and 147D Lightning Bug ===
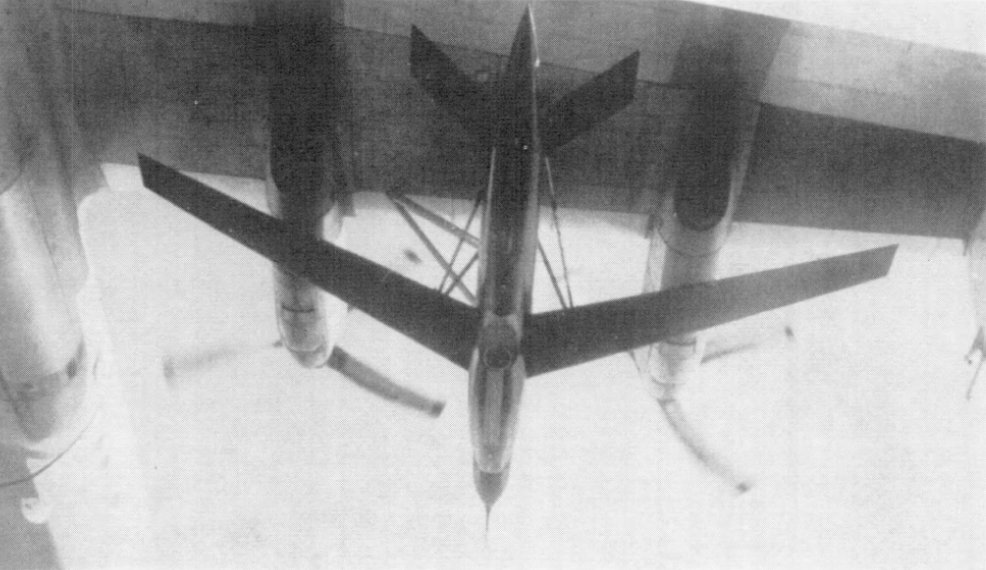
Ryan Model 147B high-altitude reconnaissance RPV under wing of a DC-130A launch aircraft.

Although the Fire Fly had yet to be used operationally, the Air Force was enthusiastic enough about the concept to issue contracts for follow-on variants. The USAF ordered nine Model 147Bs, including two prototypes and seven production aircraft. The Model 147B was designed for high-altitude reconnaissance, with wingspan extended from the 13 feet (4.0 m) span of the Model 147A to 27 feet (8.2 m), raising the 147B's operational ceiling to 62,500 feet (19.1 km).

The delivery schedule for the high-altitude Model 147B was several months out, so the Air Force also ordered seven Model 147Cs, a production version of the 147A, as an interim solution. The Model 147C had a wingspan extended to 15 feet (4.6 m), and incorporated the no-contrail system.

Three of this batch of Model 147Cs were modified to become special-purpose Model 147Ds. The 147D combined the functions of reconnaissance and the original Firebee mission of aerial target: it was to be used as bait for S-75 Dvina SAMs to obtain data on signals associated with the S-75. The SAM was targeted by a radar codenamed Fan Song and it was simple enough to pick up its signals with a normal SIGINT aircraft. The S-75 was also radio-controlled to the target by a ground command guidance link, with the missile carrying a transponder that sent back a signal to the Fan Song radar to allow tracking. Picking up these radio command signals was hazardous, since they only came on when a missile was launched. The proximity fuze signal was the most dangerous because it would only be detected moments before the SAM detonated.

A special "SAM sniffer" Radar MASINT payload was installed on the Fire Fly to pick up these signals, with the drone relaying the data to an ERB-47H electronic warfare aircraft. An active radar enhancement device was installed to encourage the enemy to take shots at the drone. The three Model 147Ds were delivered in December 1962. The Fire Fly code name had leaked in the meantime, so the new drones were given the codename Lightning Bug.

In July 1963, the Lightning Bugs reached full operational status, though they had yet to fly an operational mission. In late December 1963, the Air Force ordered fourteen more Model 147Bs. By this time Fidel Castro was threatening to shoot down U-2s flying over Cuba, and a May 1964 study concluded that the Lightning Bug was the best alternative. After information about the proposal leaked to the press, the U.S. administration decided to back up the U-2s with the Lockheed A-12, precursor of the SR-71 Blackbird spy plane.

While the fledgling Ryan Model 147 drones had thus far played only backstage roles, U.S. relations with China and North Korea and events in Southeast Asia would significantly ramp up their operational involvement in the next decade. Ryan Aeronautical's engineering expertise and feedback from the USAF's operational experience with the drones would also cause them be continually modified, redesigned and optimized for better performance, and further developed to take on an array of new missions.

During this time operational deployment of Model 147 drones would be undertaken by the Air Force's Strategic Air Command and its reconnaissance wings, equipped with DC-130 launch aircraft and recovery helicopters. Continued behind the scenes support from the National Reconnaissance Office, which had allocated project funds from its outset via the classified Program D for developing airborne intelligence collection platforms, also ensured that the Lightning Bug project would grow into a full-fledged aerial reconnaissance program.

== Operational history ==
=== China overflights ===
The Lightning Bugs remained a potentially valuable reconnaissance asset. The first opportunity for operational use came in August 1964. On 2 August, the destroyer USS Maddox was sailing in international waters off the North Vietnamese coast when it was allegedly attacked by three North Vietnamese PT boats in what is known as the Gulf of Tonkin incident, which became a pretext for a major expansion of U.S. involvement in the war in Vietnam.

The Johnson Administration feared Communist Chinese intervention in the widening war, and decided to use the Lightning Bugs to monitor Chinese activities. The drones were sent with their DC-130 director aircraft to Kadena Air Base on Okinawa to conduct overflights of southern China.

The first Lightning Bug mission took place on 20 August 1964, though there were problems. The DC-130 controlling the mission was loaded with a pair of Model 147Bs. One drone failed to launch, and was later lost when it fell off its underwing pylon. The second 147B successfully completed its mission over China, flew back to Taiwan, deployed its parachute and splashed down in a rice paddy. The drone, however was dragged over the ground by the parachute which badly damaged the machine. Its film payload was recovered intact and although the drone's navigation hadn't been as accurate as hoped, images of several primary targets were recovered.

A total of five Lightning Bug missions were performed over China into early September 1964, with only two of them successful. The Nationalist Chinese, however were very enthusiastic about the Lightning Bugs. They had been flying U-2 spy planes over mainland China on behalf of the Central Intelligence Agency and were experiencing increased losses from S-75 SAMs.

=== Lightning Bugs in combat, 1964-1965 ===
To expand reconnaissance flights to North Vietnam, in early October 1964 these operations were shifted to Bien Hoa Air Base in South Vietnam. The first Lightning Bug mission flown from Bien Hoa took place on 11 October 1964. Increasing numbers of Model 147B missions were flown over North Vietnam and southern China, with a total of 20 reconnaissance drone flights in 1964. The flights were controlled by the Strategic Air Command (SAC) from Monkey Mountain Facility in South Vietnam. The controller was stationed at Bien Hoa and the support staff was located at Da Nang Air Base, consisting of two SAC Single Sideband Operators, SSgt Willie V Collier nicknamed "Willie VC" and SSgt Walter J Dawson from the 46th Comm Gp Barksdale AFB. The Chinese were extremely eager to shoot the drones down and managed to destroy one on November 15, 1964.

Lightning Bug overflights continued and so did Chinese efforts to intercept them. The Chinese succeeded in destroying five drones by mid-April, and on 20 April 1965 put the wrecks of three of them on public display. With every shoot-down, the Chinese issued verbose press reports praising China's "great victory" in shooting down "reconnaissance planes of the imperialist United States."

Although self-destruct charges were considered for installation on overflight Lightning Bugs it was finally decided not to, and the United States simply adopted a policy of "no comment" when asked about the reconnaissance drones. With no American crews lost in the shoot-downs, the U.S. press paid very little attention to the Chinese reports.

=== Ryan Model 147G ===
The Air Force had enthusiastically embraced the Lightning Bug and was trying to refine the type, working with Ryan to obtain an improved version of the high-altitude Model 147B, designated the Model 147G. The Model 147G featured a more powerful Continental J69-T-41A turbojet, with 1,920 pounds of thrust (871 kgp), replacing the J69-T-29A used in its predecessors, and a fuselage stretched to 29 feet (8.8 m), to accommodate more fuel. The no-con system was also installed. The first 147G was delivered to the USAF in July 1965. By this time U-2 overflights of defended airspace had been phased out, with that mission left to the Lightning Bugs. The Model 147G performed its first mission in October 1965, and the Model 147B flew its last mission that December.

=== Ryan Model 147J ===
High-altitude reconnaissance over North Vietnam proved somewhat impractical. During the monsoon season, from November through March, the skies were mostly overcast, and even in fair weather smoke or ground haze could obscure reconnaissance targets. For this reason, the Air Force decided to develop a low-altitude version of the Lightning Bug. In October 1965, the service issued a contract to Ryan to develop the Model 147J, a fast-track modification of the Model 147G with a low-altitude navigation system. Low-altitude flight was more demanding than high-altitude flight, since there were many more things to run into, and a number of Model 147J drones were lost in development.

=== Ryan Model 147E ===
Among the 77 missions flown by the drones in 1965 were three flights by a special SIGINT modification of the Model 147B, designated the Model 147E, another "SAM sniffer" variant. Three Model 147Es were sent to South Vietnam in October 1965 as part of a program codenamed UNITED EFFORT. The SIGINT packages failed on all three initial missions, and the Model 147Es were sent back to the U.S. for environmental tests to track down the problem; it turned out that the SIGINT package failed when overheated. The problem was corrected and the Model 147Es were sent back to the combat zone.

On 13 February 1966 — the fourth Model 147E mission — the drone was destroyed by an S-75, but not before it relayed the vital signal data. The U.S. had been desperate to get this data ever since the deployment of the S-75, and officials claimed that this single flight justified the entire Model 147 program. The information was immediately put to use to develop a simple warning system that would tell the pilot when an S-75 command signal was turned on, meaning a missile launch was imminent; this device would go into production as the AN/APR-26.

=== Ryan Model 147F ===
Another countermeasure, the AN/ALQ-51 "Shoe Horn", had been developed to help deal with the SNR-75 radar. The AN/ALQ-51 was a deception jammer, meaning it manipulated radar signals to mislead the targeting radar into thinking the target was somewhere other than its actual location. Since the Americans had not actually acquired a SNR-75 at the time, the box had been tested against a radar simulating a SNR-75. The jammer worked well in tests, but fielding it without sending it up against an actual enemy radar was out of the question. The Model 147 was then used to operationally test the AN/ALQ-51. A single Model 147B was fitted with the package and redesignated Model 147F, flying a number of missions in July 1966. It was finally lost after almost a dozen S-75s had been fired at it.

=== Ryan Model 147N ===
A primary virtue of the Lightning Bugs was that they were far more expendable than piloted reconnaissance aircraft; but by early 1966 an average of four out of five Lightning Bugs failed to return from missions. This loss rate was unacceptable even for a relatively cheap drone, and the Air Force asked Ryan to quickly convert ten standard Firebee target drones to expendable decoys. They were fitted with traveling-wave tube (TWT) active radar enhancement devices to make them look like a bigger aircraft on radar. There were no provisions for recovery or long-range fuel capacity, since their missions were to be one-way only.

The decoys were designated Model 147N, with the first mission performed by one alongside a Model 147G on March 3, 1966. The two drones followed a parallel path until they reached the target area, where they diverged. North Vietnamese air defenses tracked the "brighter" 147N instead of the 147G, which was recovered. As an added bonus the 147Ns resulted in a few "kills" of North Vietnamese fighter aircraft. One fighter ran out of fuel when the pilot chased the drone out to sea, and other fighters were lost due to "friendly fire" accidents while hunting the drones.

The decoys worked so well that the Air Force ordered another batch of ten with a few minor improvements, and designated them Model 147NX. The initial Model 147Ns had been programmed to turn back and head for home in order to simulate a normal operational drone flight profile, and a few of them surprisingly did make it back even with their limited fuel supply. They crashed since they were not designed to be recovered, but the recovery system was not expensive and so the Model 147NX was fitted with recovery parachutes and gear as well as a cheap camera. If the decoy survived the mission, it might provide useful intelligence.

=== Lightning Bugs over Southeast Asia 1966 ===
By March 1966 the low-altitude Model 147J was ready for operational service; it featured a "barometric altitude control system" (BLACS), a dual camera payload featuring a front-to-back scan camera, a side-to-side scan camera and a new paint job. The high-altitude Lightning Bugs had been painted black which is a high-visibility color at low altitude. Model 147Js were painted gray on top and white underneath.

The fast-moving 147J drones flew low, making them difficult targets and increasing their odds of returning from a mission. Up to then the drones had parachuted to the ground upon return, but were often damaged by the impact. The Air Force then devised a retrieval method using a Sikorsky CH-3E helicopter that snagged the parachute in mid-air and winched it in. Mid-air retrieval proved effective, with an eventual 2,655 successful recoveries in 2,745 attempts, a 97% recovery rate.

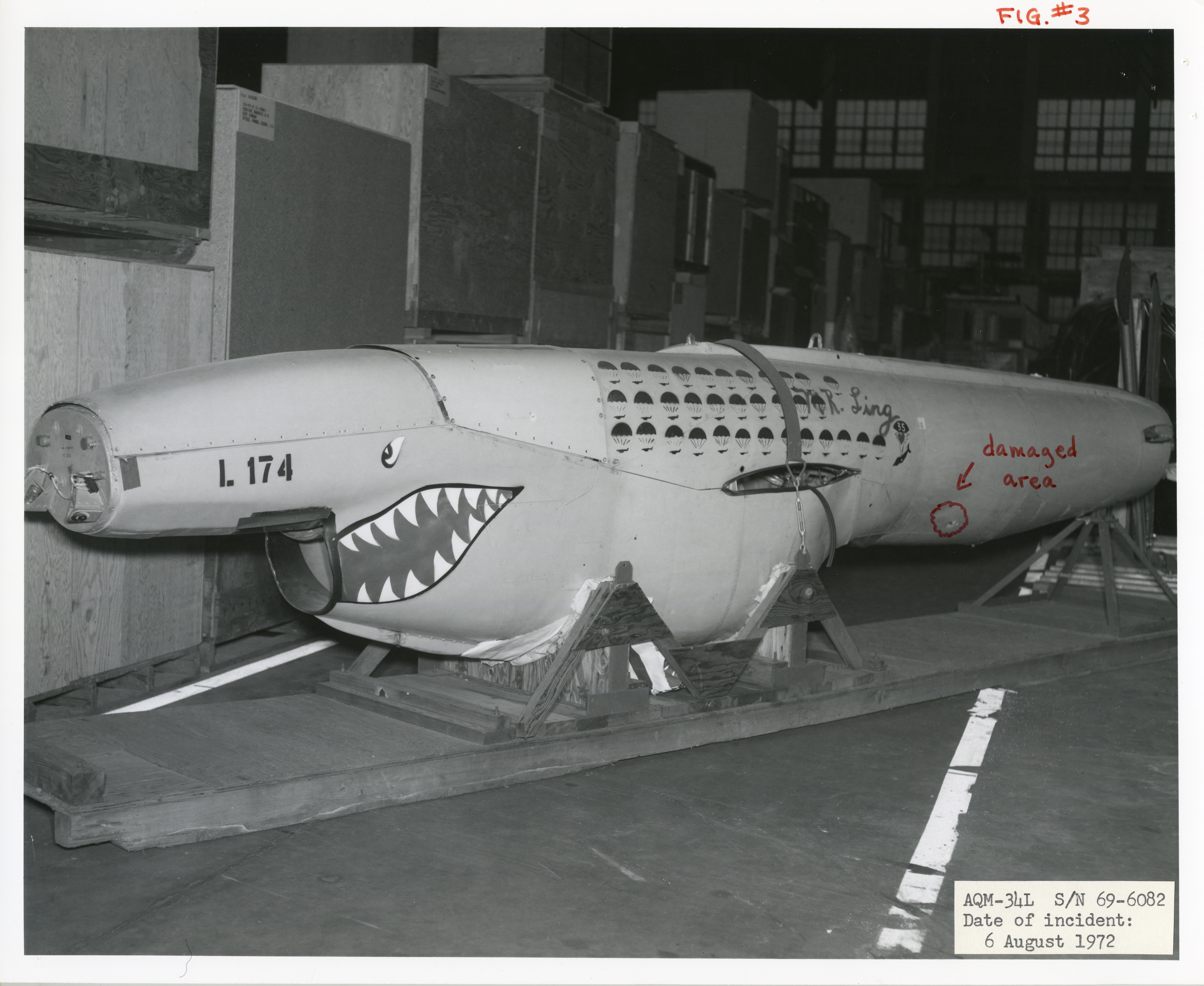
Lightning Bug hit by SAM

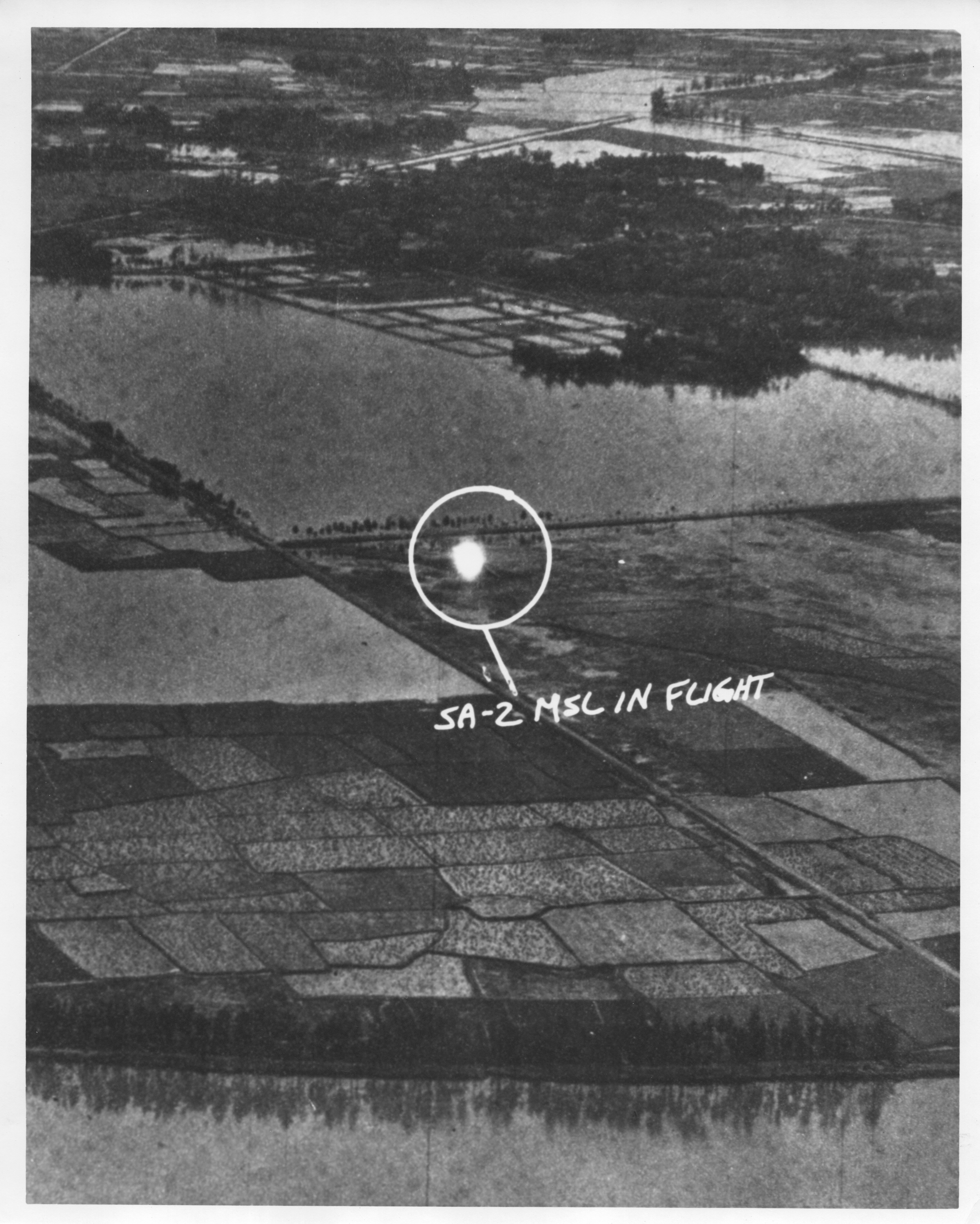
S-75 missile in flight, captured by drone camera

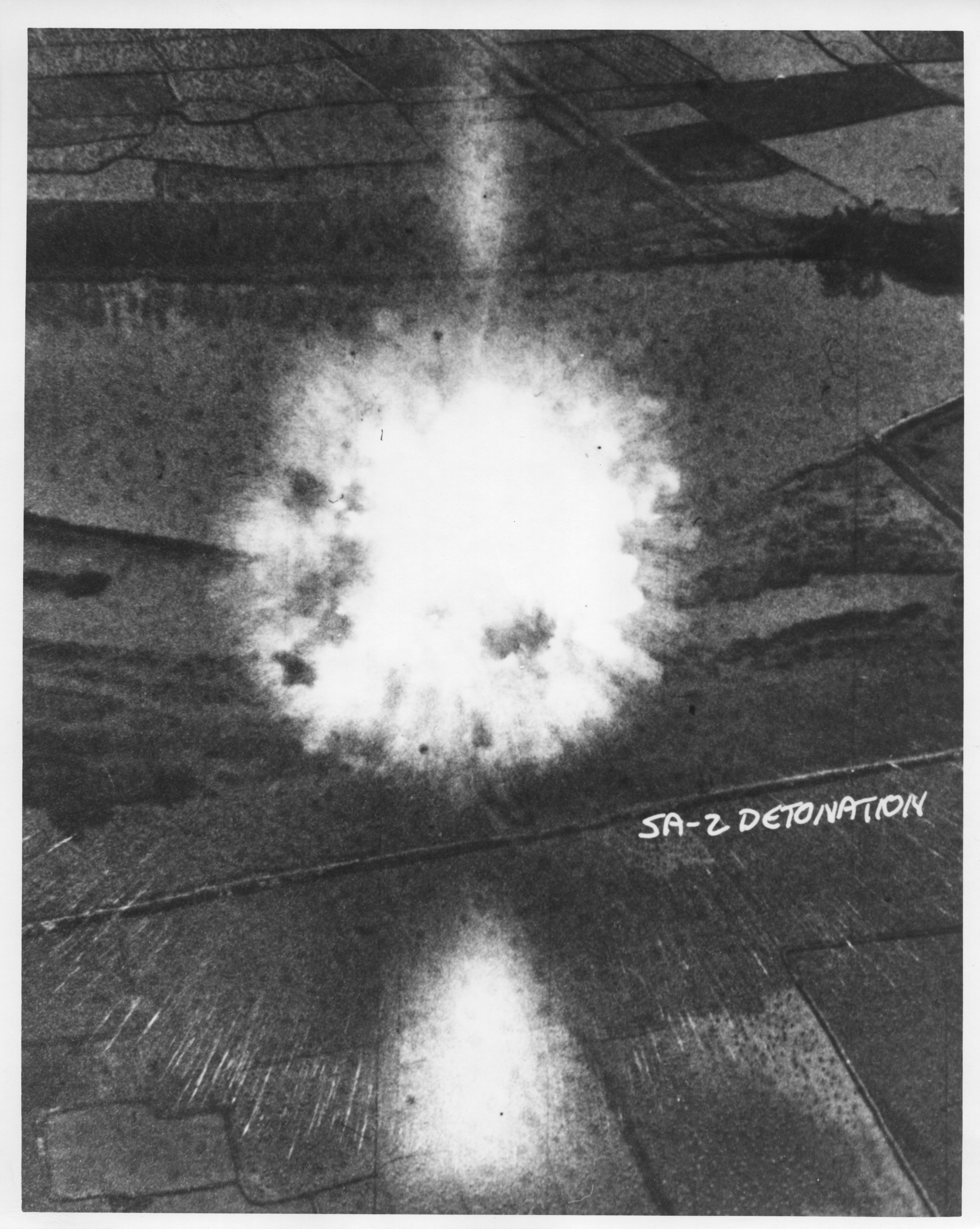
S-75 missile detonation - captured by AQM-34 camera

A total of 105 drone missions were flown over North Vietnam and Communist China in 1966. Most of these were 147G flights, along with some 147Js, as well as the 147E and 147F SIGINT missions and the 147N and 147NX decoys. One of the 147Js actually took a picture of an S-75 SAM streaking past it.

=== Ryan Model 147NP, 147NRE and 147NQ ===
The Air Force was very pleased with the low-altitude Model 147J and feared there would not be enough of them to keep up with operational attrition. Some Model 147Gs were modified to the 147J configuration, but the USAF also asked Ryan to come up with a new low-altitude reconnaissance drone on a fast track. The new variant was the Model 147NP, which was derived from the initial Model 147A. The Model 147NP had the older J69-T-29A engine and a 15-foot (4.6 m) wingspan, plus a fuselage stretched to 28 feet (8.5 m).

While Ryan was working on the Model 147NP, the Air Force also came forward with an urgent requirement for a low-altitude night reconnaissance drone. Four Model 147NPs were pulled from production and modified as Model 147NREs, where "NRE" stood for "night reconnaissance electronic". The Model 147NREs had a dual-camera payload synchronized to a bright white strobe light fitted into the drone's belly. The strobe lit up the sky when it went off.

Both the 147NREs and 147NPs went into action in Vietnam in spring of 1967. The first 147NRE mission was in late May, with the first 147NP mission following a week later. The Model 147NREs were painted black as appropriate to their night mission, while the Model 147NPs were painted in jungle camouflage colors.

The Model 147NPs performed as desired, but the Model 147NREs did not quite meet expectations. The "footprint" of the strobe light was fairly small, and the drone's navigation system lacked the accuracy to put the cameras precisely on target. Despite these drawbacks the Air Force did obtain useful intelligence from the drone's cameras even when they were not on target, as well as some minor psychological warfare effect from the startling bright strobe flashes, and felt that the concept was worth further development.

Another low-altitude reconnaissance variant was derived from the Model 147NP, the Model 147NQ. Its main distinction: instead of using an automatic guidance system, it was radio-controlled by a crewman on its DC-130 launch aircraft.

=== Ryan Model 147NA and 147NC ===
The Model 147NA was a medium-altitude electronic warfare Lightning Bug variant developed under the USAF's Compass Bin and Combat Angel programs. The 147NA had extended-span wings, a small antenna fairing on top of the fin and ability to carry chaff dispensers and active jamming pods. While they were a good asset to USAF capabilities during Operation Rolling Thunder, these medium-altitude Combat Angel ECM RPVs saw little use after the November 1968 official halt to air strikes on North Vietnam.

The Model 147NC, which entered service in 1969 with the 11th Tactical Drone Squadron was generally similar to the Model 147NA, with the addition of endplate auxiliary fins on its tailplane. It had been designed a few years earlier to fly at medium altitude carrying AN/ALE-2 chaff dispensers under each wing to counter enemy radar systems. The Model 147NC had originally been intended to support bombing raids over North Vietnam under Compass Bin and Combat Angel, but air strikes on North Vietnam were scaled back in March 1968 and stopped completely by November so the 147NC was not deployed in its intended role. When bombing resumed in 1972, chaff was dropped by piloted F-4 Phantom fighters instead. Model 147NCs did get into action during the "political offensive" of 1972 by dropping propaganda leaflets. The project was codenamed Litterbug, but the troops called them "bullshit bombers".

A medium altitude training version of the 147NC designated the Model 147NC(M1) lacked underwing pylons and was operated for reconnaissance RPV training with the 11th Tactical Drone Squadron. Some of these were later updated to AQM-34V (Ryan Model 255) standard in the mid-1970s.

=== Ryan Model 147H ===
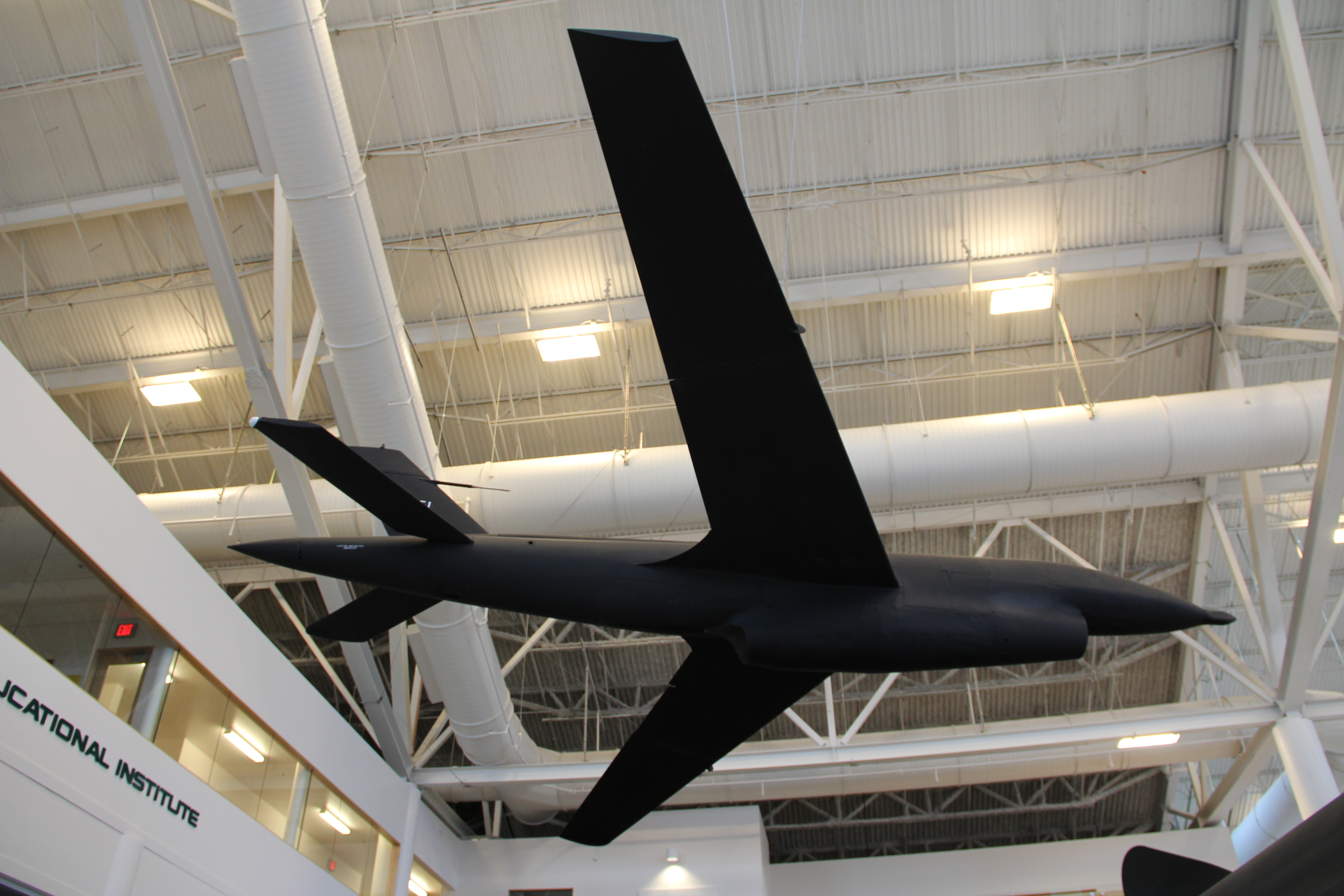
Restored AQM-34N (Ryan Model 147H) high-altitude reconnaissance RPV (USAF S/N 67-21596) originally manufactured by Ryan Aeronautical in late 1967, on display at the Evergreen Aviation & Space Museum in McMinnville, Oregon. PLA-recovered examples of the Model 147H downed in China and North Vietnam were reverse engineered to build China's Wu Zhen 5 (WZ-5) drone which first flew in 1972.

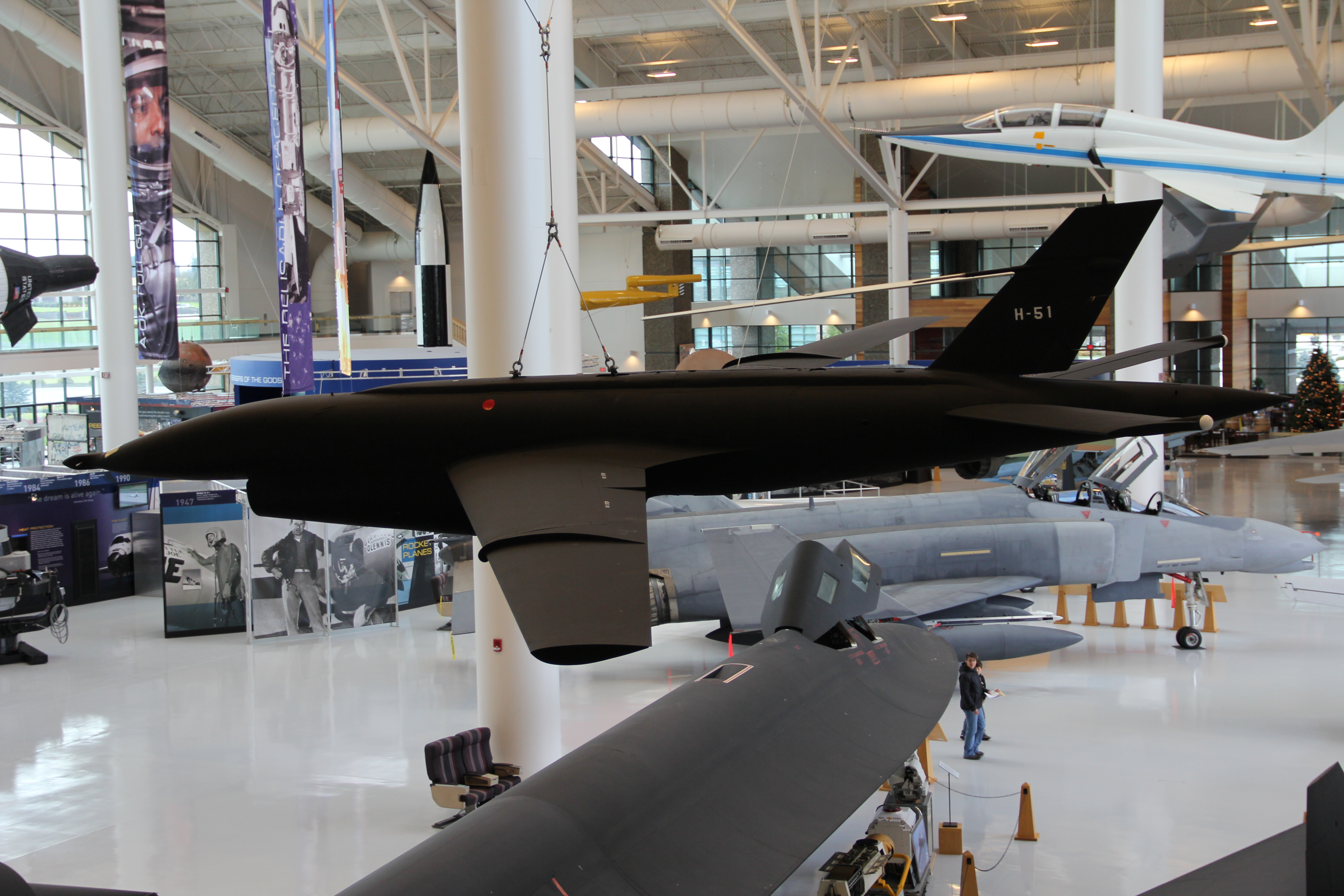
AQM-34N (Ryan Model 147H) high-altitude reconnaissance RPV (USAF S/N 67–21596) restored for preservation at the Evergreen Aviation & Space Museum

Despite the Air Force's attention to the low-altitude mission, the service hadn't given up on using Lightning Bugs for high-altitude reconnaissance and in fact continued to improve the high-altitude variants. The result was the Model 147H third-generation high-altitude Lightning Bug which made its first operational flight in March 1967 after two years of development. It was better optimized for its mission than earlier Model 147s, many of which had been modified and put into service as quickly as possible. The Model 147H had the more powerful J69-T-41A engine of the Model 147G, a lighter airframe, and a wing further stretched to 32 feet (9.8 m) span with internal fuel tanks to increase range. The 147H was capable of reaching 65,000 feet (20 km) altitudes and had a new camera payload that provided both greater area coverage and finer resolution.

"Stealthy" features that had been built into the original Lightning Bugs were becoming less and less effective, so the Model 147H was designed with new features to improve survivability, including a radar warning receiver (RWR) to alert the drone if it was illuminated by fighter or SAM radars, an improved guidance system that sent it into a right turn when alerted by the RWR, an ECM box named "Rivet Bouncer" to jam the S-75 SNR-75 radar, a coating in the jet intake to reduce radar reflectivity, and an improved no-contrail system.

Older Model 147Gs continued to fly high-altitude missions in parallel with the Model 147H drones until the 147Gs were phased out in August 1967. Despite losses, the survivability of Model 147H drones did prove to be better than that of the 147B and 147G.

=== Ryan Model 147S Buffalo Hunter ===
The U.S. Air Force also pursued a refined solution for the low-altitude reconnaissance mission, and "refinement" meant balancing optimization for the mission against cost. Strategic Air Command's Buffalo Hunter program was implemented to conduct low altitude photographic reconnaissance in Southeast Asia using unmanned aircraft, particularly for time-sensitive targets such as military airfields and suspected SAM sites in North Vietnam. The initial low-altitude drone, the Model 147J, had been derived from the high-altitude Model 147B and retained the 147B's wide wings; these were a drawback because at low altitudes they reduced the drone's maneuverability. The new low-altitude optimized Model 147S had a J69-T-41A engine and featured the original Firebee wings with a 13-foot (4.0 m) span which were also lower cost to manufacture. The fuselage was stretched to a length of 29 feet (8.8 m).

The Model 147S carried a single camera that cost less but provided better coverage than the earlier dual-camera payloads. At typical operating altitudes the camera system of the 147S could image a strip of land 60 miles (97 kilometres) long with a resolution of up to 1-foot (30 centimetres), or even six inches (15 centimetres) under optimum conditions. Cost of a production Model 147S was about $160,000 USD in contemporary dollars, which was about 60% of the cost of a Model 147G or 147H.

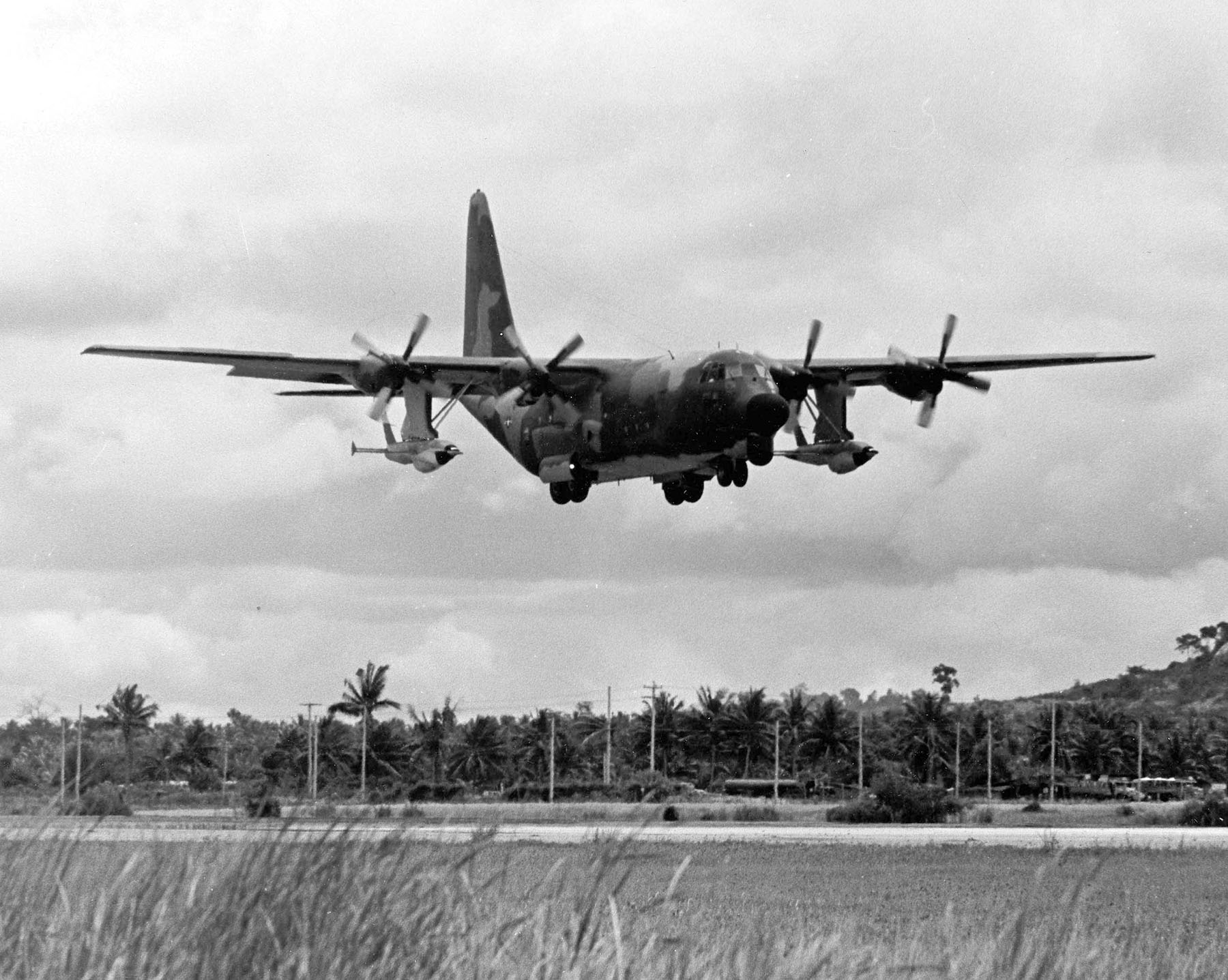
DC-130 Hercules taking off with two AQM-34L (Ryan Model 147SC) drones underwing for a reconnaissance mission over Southeast Asia

The Model 147S drones were built in a number of different production "blocks". The initial 147S block was designated the Model 147SA, and the subtype performed its initial operational flight in December 1967.

The Air Force was impressed by the results of the Model 147SA missions and ordered a second batch of Model 147SBs. The Model 147SB carried a "multiple altitude control system" (MACS) that allowed it to shift in flight between three preprogrammed altitudes ranging from 1,000 to 20,000 feet (300 to 6,100 meters), making it much more unpredictable. It also had improved gyros to permit tighter turns. Initial flights began in March 1968, with the Model 147SAs then being phased out by attrition.

The next block of 147S family was the Model 147SRE, intended for the night reconnaissance role. Instead of the white-light strobe used on the Model 147NRE, the 147SRE used an infrared strobe which was barely noticeable from the ground, and infrared film. The 147SRE also featured an improved guidance system with Doppler navigation radar and flew its first mission in November 1968. Although the Model 147SRE performed well, photo interpreters found the infrared images difficult to inspect and sometimes failed to spot targets.

The low-level 147S flights were "exciting" by the standards of robot warfare. One suffered a malfunction in its flight-control computer and decided to fly at an altitude of 150 feet (46 m) instead of 1,500 feet (460 m) as planned. The drone made it back safely, though photo interpreters were startled to find out that the images included a picture of a power line tower, taken from underneath the power lines.

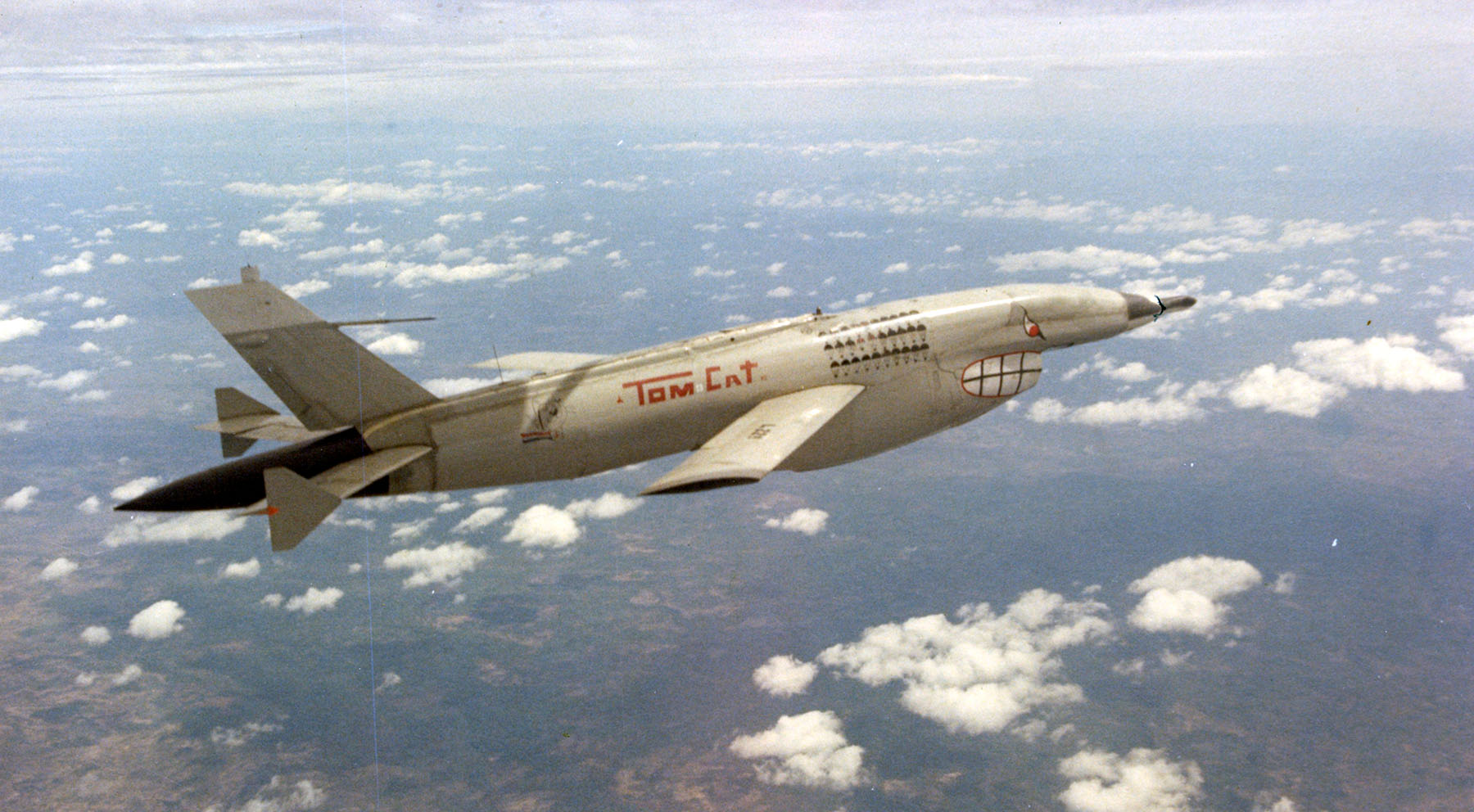
U.S. Air Force AQM-34L (Ryan Model 147SC) "Tom Cat" of the 556th Reconnaissance Squadron flew 68 missions over North Vietnam before it was lost to anti-aircraft fire over Hanoi.

Losses were heavy at the 1,000 to 1,500 feet (300 to 460 meters) altitude set for early Model 147S missions, so the flight altitude was changed to 500 feet (150 m). The drones were used in missions over Hanoi and Haiphong which had powerful air defenses. One Model 147S took a picture of an S-75 streaking past, followed by a picture of the missile exploding; then — due to an autopilot programming error — the drone skirted a ridgeline, just missing the treetops.

The fourth production variant of the Model 147S family was the Model 147SC, which featured an improved Doppler radar navigation system with digital controls for greater flight accuracy. Initial operational flight of the Model 147SC Buffalo Hunter (its program codename as known to USAF crews) was in January 1969. Of the hundreds of Model 147S drones procured by the Air Force most were Model 147SCs, which would eventually fly almost half the total number of Lightning Bug missions.

A modified version, the Model 147SC/TV, was introduced in the spring of 1972. This featured a TV camera that relayed imagery to the DC-130 drone controller aircraft.

The low altitude-optimized 147S series continued to be developed even as the war drew to a close. The Model 147SD (AQM-34M) which saw service in 1972 and later featured external underwing tanks for extended range, a substantially more accurate navigation system, and a new cooling system to deal with tropical environmental conditions. The SD was externally similar to its SC predecessor with a slightly different nose shape and systems package; 87 of the Model 147SD were built under the Air Force's Compass Bin and Buffalo Hunter programs. Some 147SDs were converted to the Model 147SDL which featured a navigation system that obtained position information from the LORAN radio location network, providing the drone with greater accuracy. One Model 147SD served as a testbed for the USAF's Compass Robin program, which aimed to develop expendable radio frequency sensors that could be covertly ejected from RPVs or drones in areas defended by Soviet S-75 Dvina SNR-75 radars and thus provide the capability to collect electronic intelligence information.

==== Ryan Model 147SK ====
The U.S. Navy also decided to get into the reconnaissance drone business for a while. They ordered a batch of Model 147SCs modified for ship launch using a RATO booster. Navy Lightning Bugs were designated Model 147SK and were generally similar to the 147SC, except for the RATO bottle brace on lower rear fuselage/empennage and having a 4.6-meter (15 ft) wingspan. First operational flight was in November 1969. After RATO launch, a Model 147SK was guided to an initial checkpoint under radio control from a Grumman E-2A Hawkeye aircraft. From that checkpoint the drone conducted the rest of the flight with its autonomous navigation system and then was recovered by helicopter. Several dozen operational flights were performed which the Navy (for some obscure reason) referred to as "Belfrey Express"; these concluded in May 1970. The Air Force's 100th Strategic Reconnaissance Wing Strategic Reconnaissance 1956-1976: A History of the 4080th/100th SRW unit history book, on page 207, states that (based on statistical mission reliability data provided by Teledyne Ryan) the Wing provided "assistance to the Navy on thirty-one 147SK flights." The Navy did not pursue the Lightning Bug further. Damaged airframes displayed by China and North Vietnam are reported to include some Model 147SK wreckage.

=== Ryan Model 147T and 147TE/TF Combat Dawn ===
By 1968 most of the Lightning Bug missions were low-altitude flights; yet the Air Force still regarded the high-altitude mission as important enough to obtain a refined version of the Model 147H, the Model 147T. Its main improvement was a more powerful engine, the Teledyne CAE J100-CA-100 with 2,800 pounds of thrust (1,270 kgp) which allowed the drone to operate at higher altitudes up to almost 75,000 feet (23 km). The initial 147T mission was flown in April 1969 but overall frequency of high-altitude reconnaissance missions continued to decline, with the last Model 147T missions over Southeast Asia performed during June 1971.

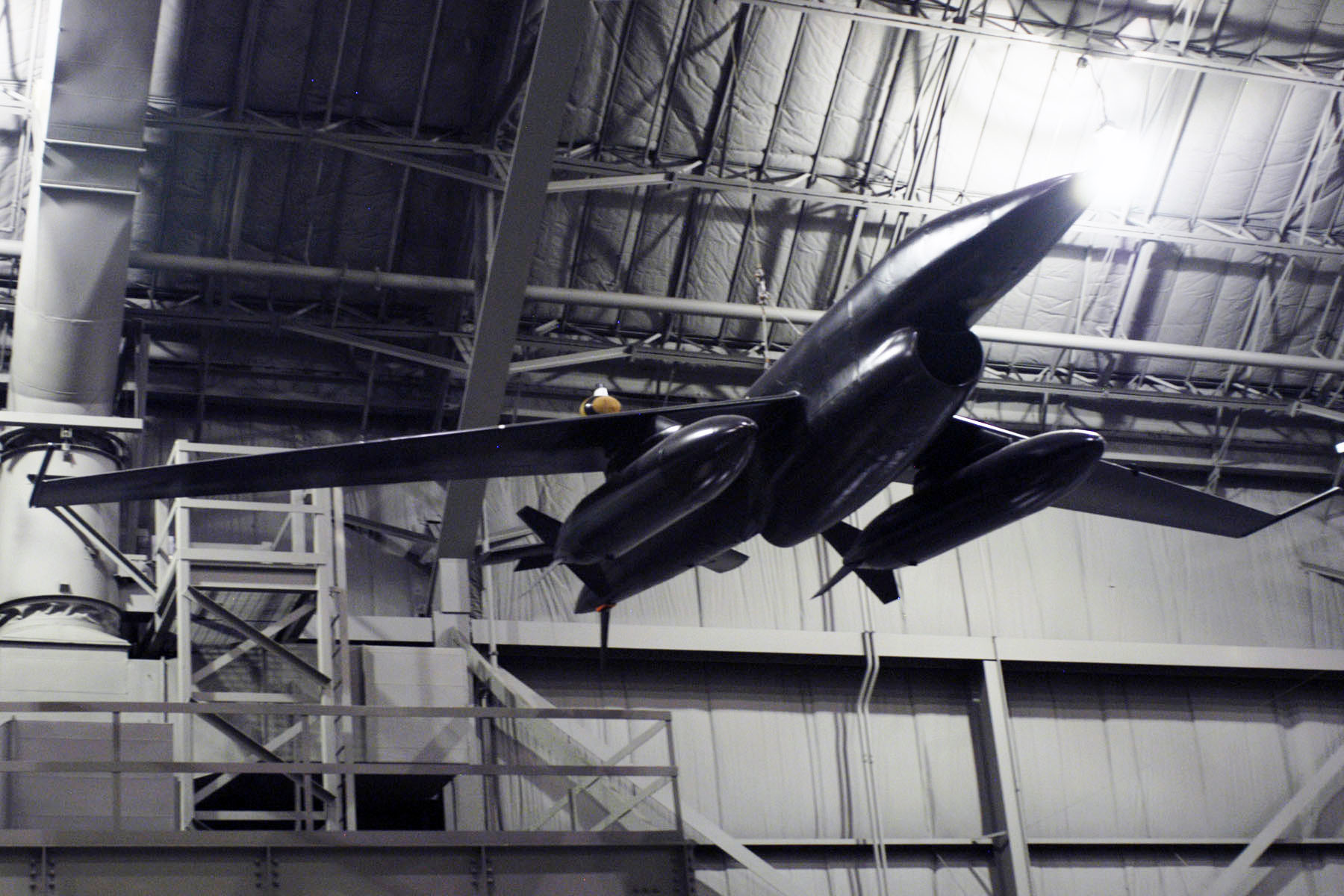
AQM-34Q (Ryan Model 147TE) Combat Dawn RPV displayed in the Southeast Asia War Gallery at the National Museum of the United States Air Force

Despite the general decline in high-altitude reconnaissance RPV use, new mission roles would emerge. In April 1969 a Lockheed EC-121 Super Constellation SIGINT aircraft was shot down in international airspace by North Korean fighters, killing all 31 crew members on the aircraft. This incident led to consideration of using an unmanned drone to do the SIGINT job, resulting in the Model 147TE or Combat Dawn RPV. The Model 147TE's first operational flight was in February 1970, although this flight and those that followed over two months were really just evaluation tests. The tests proved successful and an order for fifteen production Model 147TE drones followed, with the first operational flight of a production 147TE in October 1970.

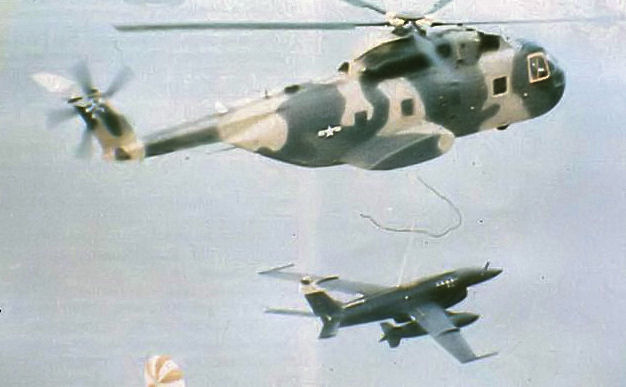
Sikorsky CH-3E inflight capture of a 556th Reconnaissance Squadron AQM-34R (Ryan Model 147TF) Combat Dawn RPV.

The Model 147TEs did not overfly hostile airspace; they stayed well out to sea at relatively high altitude, or cruised along the border between North and South Korea. They could fly under their own guidance or be controlled by their DC-130 launch aircraft. The drones relayed SIGINT data over a data link to ground stations for analysis. This data link technology would be developed for use in other reconnaissance aircraft, such as the Lockheed U-2 and the Beechcraft RC-12 Guardrail.

Late in the Model 147TE program, underwing external tanks were added to improve time on-station from five to eight hours. In 1973 an updated version, the Model 147TF, with external tanks as standard and improved SIGINT gear went into operation. Almost 500 missions were flown by Model 147TE and 147TF Combat Dawn RPVs between 1970 and 1975.

=== The last days of the Lightning Bugs 1969-1975 ===
In 1969, the U.S. Air Force officially redesignated the Ryan 147 program model numbers as AQM-34 (see chart below), although the manufacturer-assigned numbers remained in popular use. Back in Southeast Asia, Lightning Bugs continued their overflights. A number of missions focused on a prisoner of war (POW) camp near the city of Sơn Tây in North Vietnam, in order to determine if American POWs were being held there. The drone overflights of the Son Tay camp were halted in favor of overflights with the Lockheed SR-71 Blackbird spy plane, as U.S. intelligence officials felt that too many drone overflights might make the enemy suspicious; this was apparently so, because when the camp was finally raided on November 21, 1970, during Operation Ivory Coast no American POWs were there. It was a disappointing result to one of the more daring operations of the war.

By 1970 the Model 147 program was beginning to become public knowledge. Aviation Week magazine carried an article on the drones that November, though it was based on informal and unconfirmed information. The following spring, the Air Force released pictures of the drones along with a very general statement that they were used for reconnaissance. No technical or operational details were released.

The number of drone sorties continued to increase through 1971 and 1972. The Model 147SC was the workhorse for low-altitude reconnaissance during this period; in December 1972 during Operation Linebacker II the USAF depended almost entirely on the Buffalo Hunter AQM-34L/M RPVs for bomb damage assessment due to bad weather. High altitude flights by the 147T series continued. The Model 147H was on the way out by this time, performing its last mission in September 1972. The Soviets had updated the S-75's electronics, thus American electronic countermeasures needed to be updated as well. Cameras were replaced by a "SAM sniffer" payload, and a Model 147H flight on September 28 was able to obtain the necessary data before the drone was destroyed by an S-75.

The North Vietnamese conducted an invasion of South Vietnam in the spring of 1972 which was broken by American air power. U.S. President Richard Nixon then retaliated with a renewed bombing campaign against North Vietnam, codenamed Operation Linebacker, to persuade the North Vietnamese to negotiate. The two sides seemed to be close to an agreement, but in December 1972 the talks collapsed and President Nixon ordered the Operation Linebacker II campaign which continued into the final days of 1972. The bombing stopped completely after the January 1973 peace agreement.

Reconnaissance flights continued after signing of the peace treaty in order to ensure that the North Vietnamese were honoring their side of the bargain. By this time drone technology and operational practice had been well refined. While the Model 147SC drones had been designed to survive an average of 2.5 missions, in practice the average was much higher. One example, nicknamed "Tom Cat", performed a record 68 missions.

The Lightning Bug program had proven highly successful. A series of fast-track adaptations of an existing target drone resulted in a system whose effectiveness was beyond expectations, even with guidance technology that was extremely crude by 21st century standards. Despite this, Lightning Bugs could not affect the course of the war. Drone reconnaissance clearly showed that the North Vietnamese were violating their agreement with the Americans on a massive scale, but the U.S. leadership was unwilling to commit to ending its "endless war". When the North Vietnamese began their last offensive in early 1975 the U.S. did little to stop it; Saigon fell on April 30, 1975, and the war was over.

The Lightning Bug program also came to an end. The last Model 147S low-altitude drone flight occurred on the day Saigon fell. AQM-34R / Model 147TF Combat Dawn flights continued until June 1975, and then most of the surviving drones were stockpiled.

== Post-Vietnam use and Ryan Models 234, 259 and 255 ==
=== BGM-34A, BGM-34B and BGM-34C ===
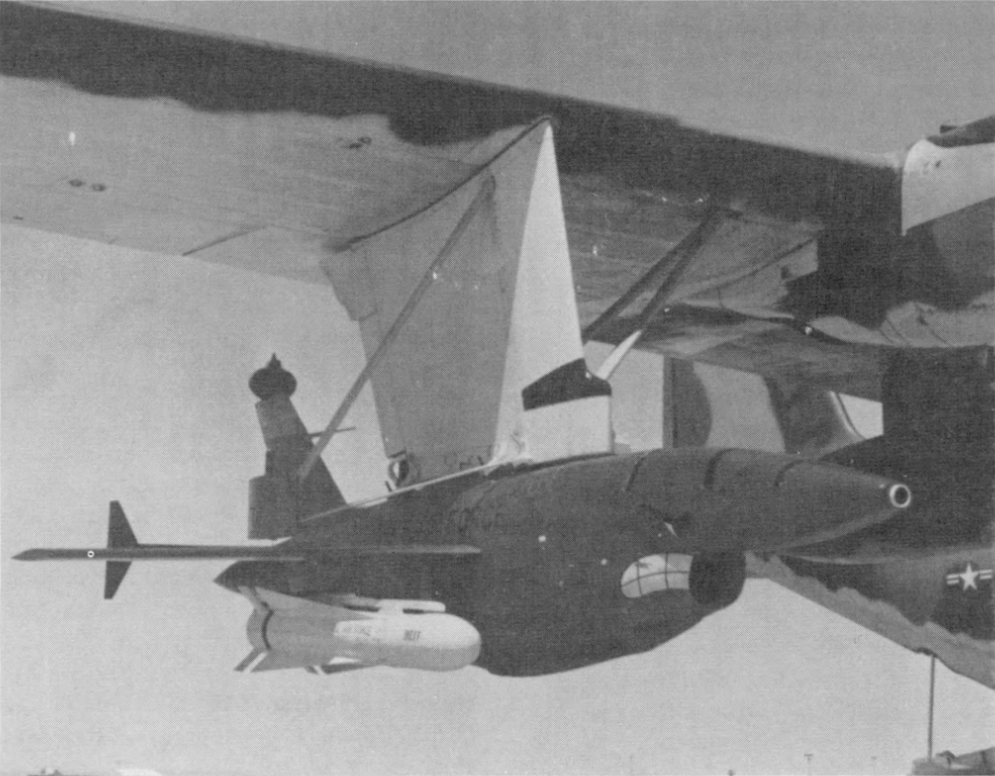
BGM-34A (Ryan Model 234) RPV with AGM-65 Maverick missile and bulbous data link fairing atop its vertical fin, mounted on the underwing pylon of a DC-130E

Schematic of the BGM-34C (Ryan Model 259) multi-mission RPV

Teledyne Ryan proposed follow-on drone variants based on the Model 147 series which could undertake various tactical strike and defense suppression missions, and also carry and deliver precision-guided munitions. The BGM-34 series development RPVs underwent evaluation by Tactical Air Command in the early and mid-1970s as part of the USAF's Pave Strike air-to-surface precision guided weapons program but due to post-Vietnam cutbacks (and withdrawal of NRO funding for RPVs) were never service-adopted or funded for production. Two BGM-34A prototypes were built and tested with AGM-45 Shrike, AGM-65 Maverick and Rockwell HOBOS guided weapons. Eight BGM-34Bs with more powerful Teledyne CAE J69-T-41A 1,920 pounds-force (8.5 kN) thrust engines were also built and evaluated, including a 'Pathfinder' version with laser designator and low light level TV (LLLTV) camera in its Philco-Ford nose pack. Six Model 147SC / AQM-34L drones were fitted with upgraded Lear Siegler avionics in 1972, redesignated YAQM-34U and five of these would later become BGM-34C multi-mission RPVs using modular nose and fuselage equipment and systems packages. Teledyne Ryan assigned their company designation Model 234 to the BGM-34A, Model 234A to the BGM-34B, and Model 259 to the BGM-34C.

=== XQM-103 high maneuverability RPV ===
In the early 1970s the United States Air Force Flight Dynamics Laboratory (FDL) reinforced the airframe of one Model 147J and added a digital flight control system that could be preprogrammed for combat specific maneuvers to investigate high maneuverability flight. The modified drone was originally designated the FDL-23 and later the XQM-103. Several test flights were made, with the machine able to perform 10-G turns in its final configuration.

=== AQM-34V / Ryan Model 255 ===
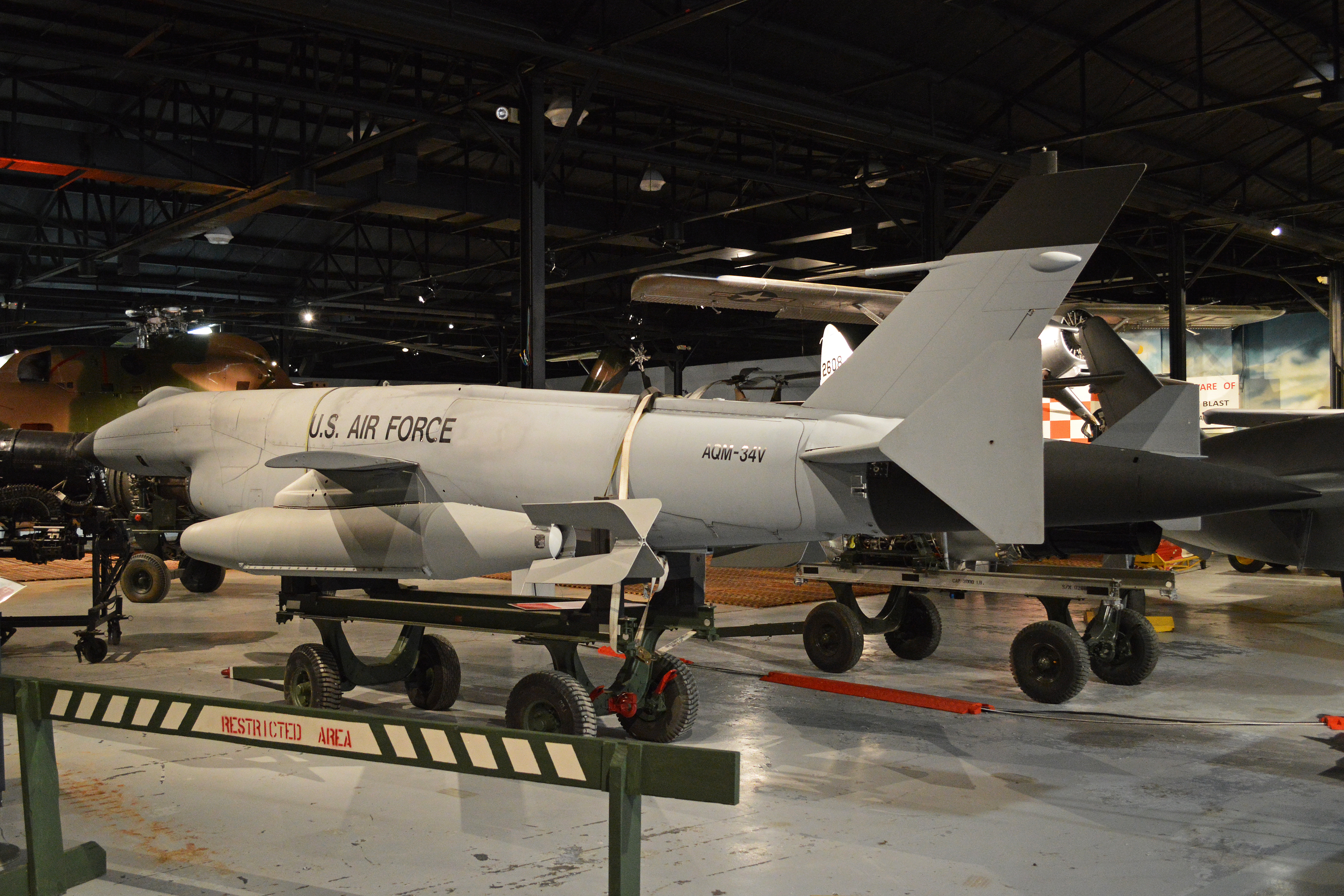
AQM-34V (Ryan Model 255) electronic warfare RPV displayed at the Museum of Aviation in Warner Robins, Georgia

From 1975 to 1978 approximately forty-seven Model 147NC AQM-34H/AQM-34J drones were converted to an improved countermeasures specification with both chaff dispensers and active jamming gear, and redesignated Model 255 / AQM-34V for service with the 432nd Tactical Drone Group at Davis–Monthan Air Force Base. Flight tests commenced in May 1976, and sixteen new production Model 255s were additionally acquired. In 1979 the AQM-34Vs joined the other Lightning Bugs in storage.

=== Ryan Model 124I ===
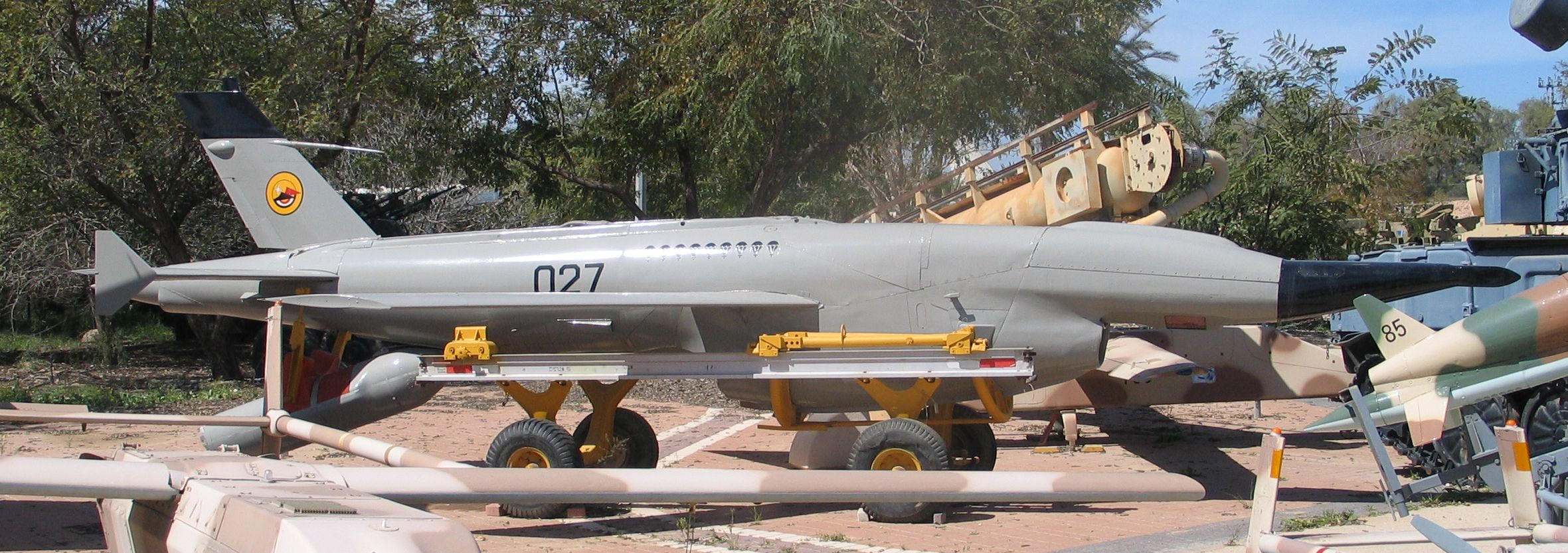
Teledyne Ryan reconnaissance UAV (Ryan Model 124I, IDF designation Mabat) at Muzeyon Heyl ha-Avir, Hatzerim Airbase, Israel in 2006

A number of reconnaissance RPVs were delivered to Israel in the early 1970s, designated Model 124I and fitted to Israeli specifications for low-altitude observation. The Israelis called them Mabat, meaning "observation" but also acronym of "Matos Bli Tayas" (=aircraft with no pilot). Although Teledyne Ryan's company designation number "124" in common with its Model 124 / BQM-34 Firebee target was nominally assigned for these export drones, their external appearance, configuration and low-altitude reconnaissance role was virtually identical to Ryan's Model 147SC and 147SD which were in extensive use by the USAF as the AQM-34L/M at that same time. The drones were ground-launched with a RATO booster and recovered in mid-air by helicopter, saw service in the 1973 Yom Kippur War and later conflicts, and were not retired until the mid-1990s.

=== Withdrawal from service ===
Operational costs, budget cuts and absence of Vietnam-era NRO 'black' funding for RPVs were not the only reasons the USAF eventually abandoned the BGM-34C and AQM-34V tactical drone projects after the 1970s. While the Model 147 series had performed well in the tropical weather conditions and relative air superiority held by the U.S. in variable-intensity conflict in Southeast Asia, its proposed reconnaissance, tactical strike and ECM successors would additionally be required by Tactical Air Command to perform in severe weather, electronic warfare and integrated air defense environments against Warsaw Pact forces in Northern Europe. BGM-34 RPV testing had shown that the drones would need deicing systems to operate effectively, their data links should be more robust, and combat launch and recovery aircraft (apart from being logistically costly) would also be at severe risk in proximity of Soviet forces, particularly the recovery helicopters. A final 'nail in the coffin' for the 1970s TAC drones was, despite the fact that they would not be delivering nuclear weapons, their "unmanned" status and flight performance fell under language spelled out in the 1979 SALT II treaty (a sensitive part of which was negotiated limits on recent U.S. cruise missiles) about self-propelled, guided, weapon delivery vehicles capable of flying distances of more than 372 miles (599 km) before fuel exhaustion; this caused the BGM-34C to be defined as a strategic weapon under the treaty.

=== Post-1980s use ===
Firebees remain in service as targets, so it is unsurprising that they are still being configured for reconnaissance missions. In the late 1990s Teledyne Ryan, using company funds, configured two Firebees with cameras and communications electronics to provide real-time intelligence for battlefield target acquisition and damage assessment. These two UAVs, each named Argus, were used in a USAF "Green Flag" exercise to relay images in real-time from the test range in Nevada to Air Force officers in Florida.

Five BQM-34-53 Extended Range Firebees were also used to lay chaff corridors during the 2003 invasion of Iraq. The drones were modernized by Northrop Grumman in a fast-response program earlier that year, being fitted with chaff dispensers and other improvements including GPS-based programmable waypoint guidance systems (which may or not have been added by the upgrade program). These Firebees were delivered for service in charcoal-black paint schemes. Only one DC-130 drone launcher aircraft remained in the U.S. military's inventory at the time and was not immediately operational due to a malfunction. Two Firebees were ground-launched on the first night of the operation; the other three were air-launched by the DC-130 on the second night of the operation. The drones flew until they ran out of fuel and crashed. Iraqi TV broadcast footage of the wrecks while describing them as piloted aircraft.

=== WZ-5 UAV ===
The Chinese Wu Zhen-5 (Chinese: 无侦-5, WZ-5) is a reverse engineered AQM-34N. China shot down and recovered AQM-34Ns during the Vietnam War starting in late-1964. The WZ-5 may have been used during the Sino-Vietnamese War in 1979. It entered service with the People's Liberation Army by 1981. The export version was the Chang Hong-1 (Chinese: 长虹-1, CH-1).

== Mission summary ==
A total of 3,435 Lightning Bug sorties were flown against Communist China, North Vietnam, and North Korea, with the mission breakdown by year as follows:

- 1964: 20
- 1965: 77
- 1966: 105
- 1967: >100
- 1968: 340
- 1969: 437
- 1970: >400
- 1971: 406
- 1972: 570
- 1973: 444
- 1974: 518 (includes flights in first half of 1975)

Almost half of the missions were flown by the Model 147SC, of which about a thousand were built. 578 drones of all types were lost, with over half shot down and the rest lost in various accidents. It is something of a compliment to the usefulness of the Model 147 that the Chinese used the Lightning Bugs shot down over their territory to copy the basic Firebee design and produce it themselves.

== Variants ==
- 147A: Initial variant, minor mod of Firebee with stretched fuselage.
- 147C: 147A update, no-contrail system, 4.6-meter (15 ft) wingspan.
- 147D: Modified 147C to "sniff" SAM proximity fuze emissions.
- 147B: First high-altitude variant, 8.2-meter (27 ft) wingspan.
- 147G: 147B update, fuselage stretch, no-contrail system, new engine.
- 147H: Optimized high-altitude drone, 9.8-meter (32 ft) wingspan.
- 147T: Improved 147H with more powerful engine.
- 147E: 147B with 147C SAM "sniffer" payload.
- 147F: One-off 147B mod to test S-75 Dvina countermeasures.
- 147J: Fast-track mod of 147B for low-altitude reconnaissance.
- 147TE: ELINT version of 147T, used in Korea.
- 147TF: Improved 147TE with external tanks.
- 147N: Expendable decoy derived directly from Firebee.
- 147NA: Chaff dispenser variant.
- 147NC: Chaff / leaflet dispenser variant.
- 147NC(M1): Low-level version of 147NC.
- 147NX: Expendable decoy with secondary reconnaissance capability.
- 147NP: Fast-track low-altitude drone derived from 147A.
- 147NRE: Night reconnaissance modification of 147NP.
- 147NQ: Radio controlled version of 147NP.
- 147SA: Optimized low-altitude 147, Firebee wings, stretched fuselage.
- 147SB: 147S variant with multiple-altitude control system.
- 147SRE: Night reconnaissance 147S with infrared strobe, Doppler radar.
- 147SC: Improved Doppler navigation system, largest number produced.
- 147SC/TV: 147SC with TV camera.
- 147SK: Naval 147SC with 4.6-meter (15 ft) wingspan and RATO launch.
- 147SD: 147SC with improved navigational system, external tanks.
- 147SDL: 147SD with LORAN guidance backup.

=== Military redesignation numbers (Post 1969) ===
- AQM-34N: 147H
- AQM-34G (chaff dispensing): 147NA/NC
- AQM-34H (leaflet dispensing): 147NC
- AQM-34J: 147NC(M1)
- AQM-34K: 147SRE
- AQM-34L: 147SC
- AQM-34M: 147SD
- AQM-34P: 147T
- AQM-34Q: 147TE
- AQM-34R: 147TF

== Surviving aircraft ==
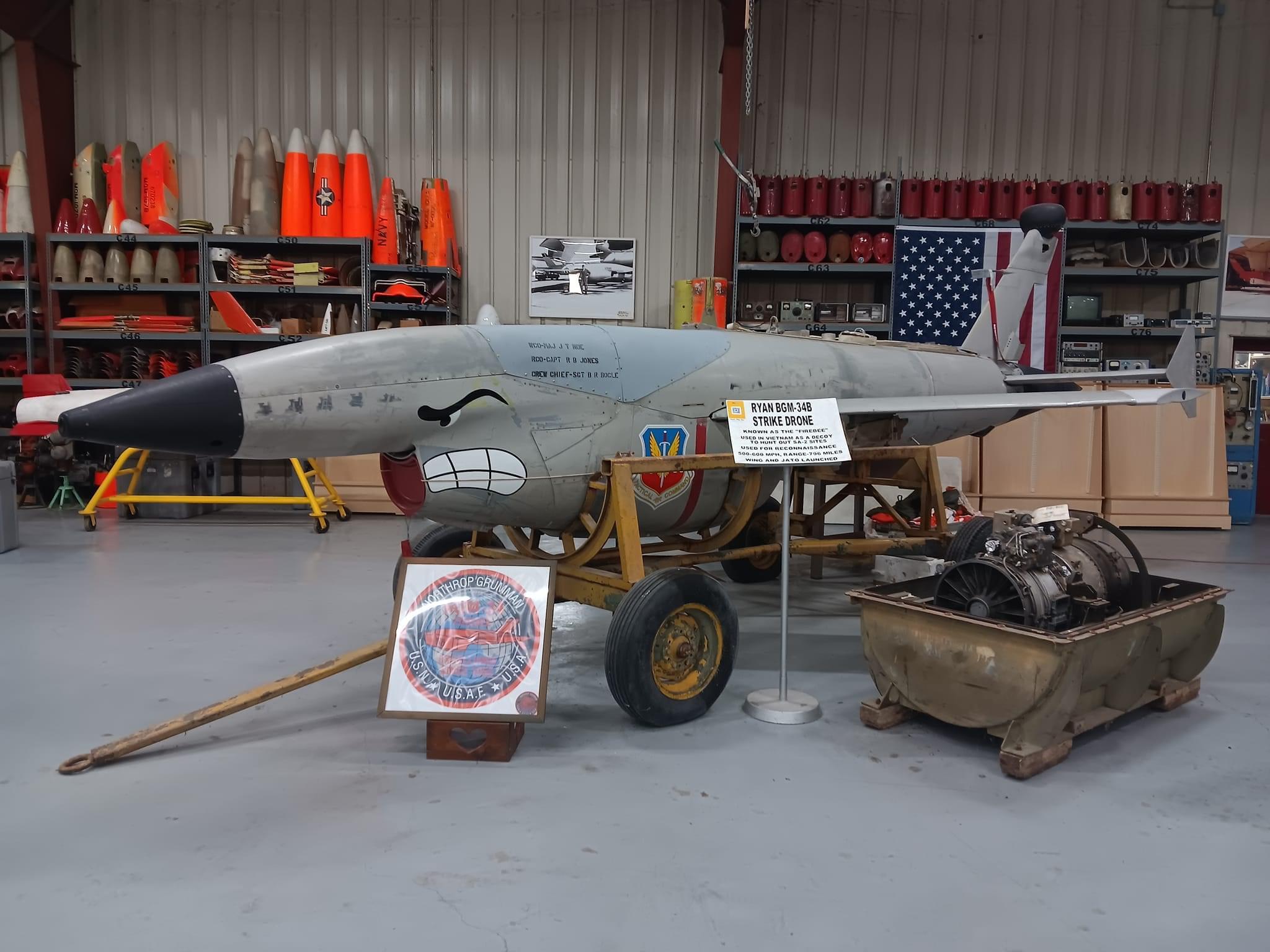
BGM-34B, RPV-007 on display. The lone survivor out of the 8 34's made for project HAVE LEMON TASK 05- proof of strike drone concept

- BGM-34B under restoration at the Aviation Unmanned Vehicle Museum in Caddo Mills, Texas.
