= Lockheed DC-130 =

American military UAV carrier

DC-130
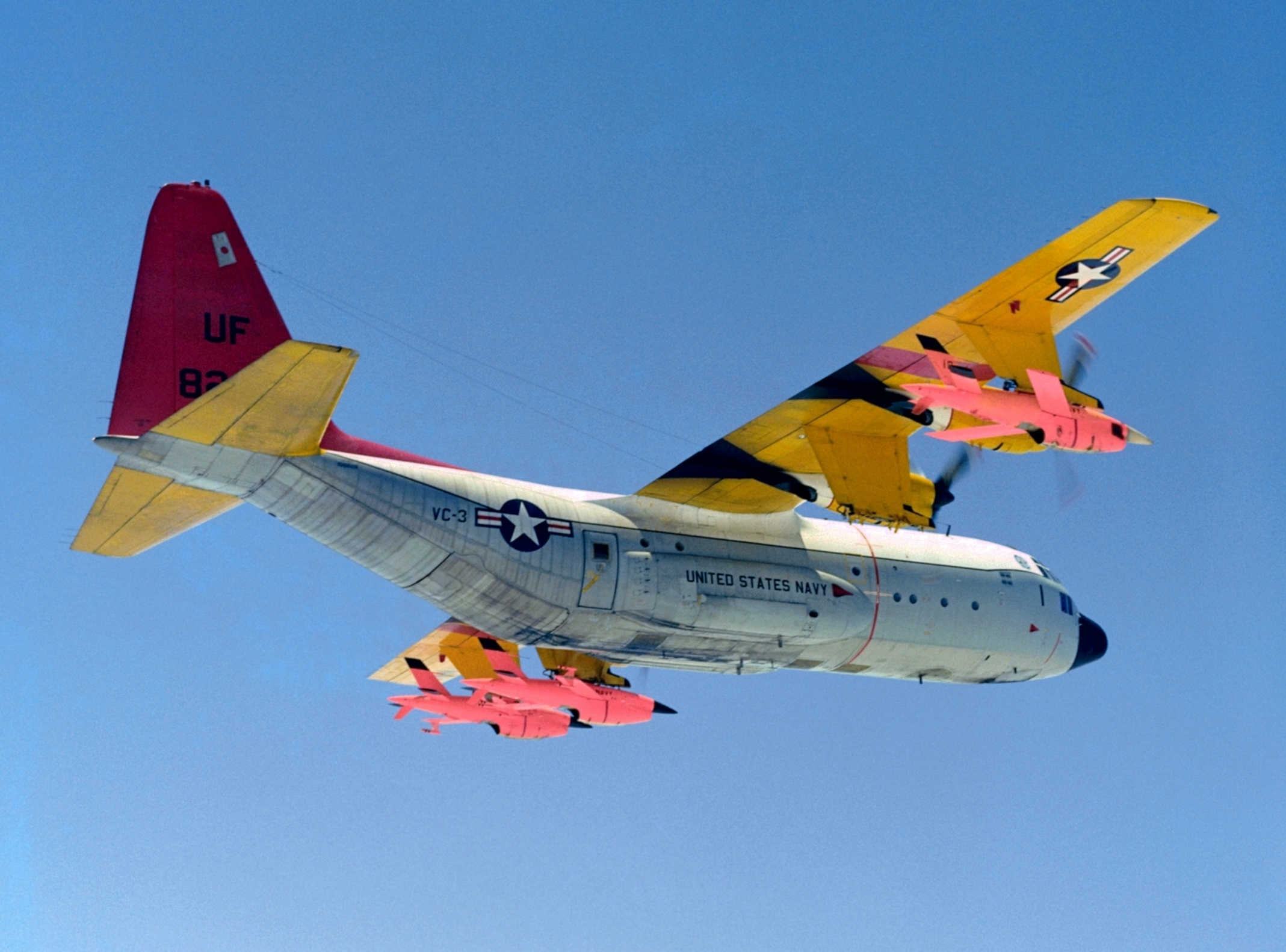
- A U.S. Navy DC-130A preparing to launch BQM-34 Firebee target drones.

General information
- Type: Drone control aircraft
- National origin: United States
- Manufacturer: Lockheed
- Status: Retired
- Primary users: United States Air Force United States Navy

History
- Developed from: Lockheed C-130 Hercules

The Lockheed DC-130 is a variant of the C-130 Hercules modified for drone control. It can carry four Ryan Firebee drones underneath its wings.

== Development ==
=== Origin of the design ===
Since World War I, many nations' air forces have investigated different means of remotely controlling aircraft. Spurred by the 1960 U-2 incident, the United States Air Force gained a renewed interest in using unmanned aerial vehicles (UAV), or drones, to obtain intelligence on the SA-2 Guideline surface-to-air missile system. Under the code names "Lightning Bug" and "Compass Cookie", Firebee target drones were modified for reconnaissance as the Ryan Model 147. The drones were test flown over North Korea and China after the Gulf of Tonkin incident in August 1964.

While perfect for reconnaissance, the use of a ground-based radar van for command, track and control limit the combat ability of drones. The team controlling the drones was also limited to a single, stationary recovery area. To improve range and recoverability of the drones, beginning in 1957 some C-130As were modified to carry the drones on underwing pylons and were re-designated as GC-130, MC-130 or DC-130.

=== Operational use ===
The Strategic Air Command (SAC) initially operated DC-130s assigned to its 100th Strategic Reconnaissance Wing (100 SRW) at Davis–Monthan AFB, Arizona from 1966 through 1976. In 1976, the 100th's DC-130s and drone assets were transferred to the 432nd Tactical Drone Group of Tactical Air Command (TAC) at Davis–Monthan AFB. Concurrent with this action, the 100 SRW's U-2 aircraft assets were transferred to the 9th Strategic Reconnaissance Wing (9 SRW) and merged with the latter's SR-71 aircraft assets at Beale AFB, California. The 100 SRW was then re-designated as the 100th Air Refueling Wing (100 ARW) and relocated to Beale AFB, operating KC-135 Stratotanker aircraft, until its later reassignment to its current home of RAF Mildenhall, United Kingdom.

In the drone carrier role, target or strike (weapons carrier) drones were carried on two pylons located under each wing of the DC-130: one between the engines and one outboard of the engines. This allowed the DC-130 to carry and control four drones simultaneously. Strike drones were never deployed operationally and only reconnaissance and electric warfare drone types were used in the field.

DC-130s could launch, track and control the drones. The aircraft contained two launch stations (one for each drone) from which all systems on the drone were activated and checked. From those stations the engines were started, run through their checks and stabilized at the correct power setting for launch. A two-man station, just aft of the flight compartment, contained all the tracking and control functions. Instruments displayed all data transmitted from the drone—such as heading, speed, altitude, power setting and flight attitudes. Navigation and tracking data were fed to a system that plotted the current position of both the drone and DC-130 on a large map board in front of the operators. The planned track of the drone was drawn on the board, which enabled the crew to immediately detect any deviation in the drone's flight path. The drone controllers monitored and recorded video data from drones equipped with television cameras and recorded any other data collected by other special-purpose drones.

The DC-130 was used in both the development and proposed employment of the AQM-91A Compass Arrow in the late 1960s and early 1970s, as well as Senior Prom, a program to develop stealthy cruise missiles in 1978.

Reconnaissance drones were much larger and heavier than target drones or strike drones, meaning the DC-130As could only carry one reconnaissance drone pylon under each wing. Each drone pylon was placed between the engines, replacing the auxiliary fuel tank on earlier models. When a select number of C-130E aircraft were converted to drone carriers as DC-130Es for USAF, they retained the underwing tanks and the drone pylons were installed outboard of the engines. The DC-130Es also differed from the DC-130As in having a chin radome containing a microwave guidance system in addition to the nose thimble radome which housed tracking radar. Introduction of the DC-130E significantly increased the capability and endurance of the U.S. Air Force DC-130 fleet. Concurrent with the USAF transition to the DC-130E, the extant DC-130As were transferred to the U.S. Navy for target drone carrier and control operations in the Navy's Southern California Operating Area (SOCAL OpArea). Assigned to Fleet Composite Squadron Three (VC-3), the squadron flew missions originally from NAS North Island in San Diego, California and later from NAS Point Mugu in Ventura County, California.

The DC-130H project was tested at Hill Air Force Base, Utah with the 6514th Test Squadron. This aircraft was designed to carry and deploy up to four drones; it could also provide control for up to 16 drones simultaneously. With the end of the Vietnam war and consequent decline in need for combat drones, only one C-130H aircraft was converted for the project.

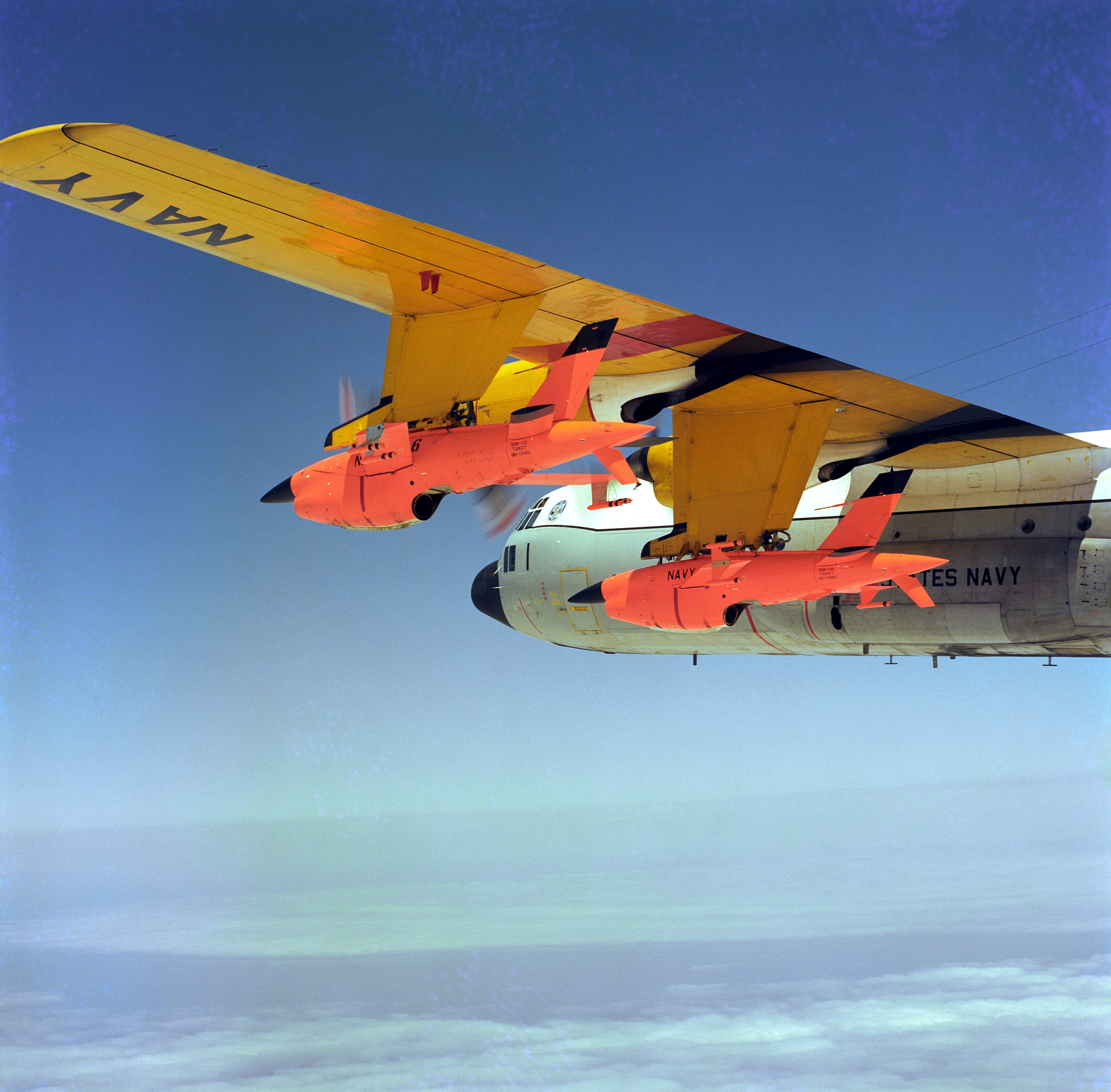
DC-130A drone control aircraft carrying two BQM-34S Firebee target drones under its wing.

=== The drones ===
The Q-2C/BQM-34A Firebee target drone was modified for the reconnaissance mission and designated AQM-34 or Ryan Model 147. Its size was increased to enhance range and payload. For the low altitude mission, wingspan was increased to 15 feet (4.6 m) and later to 27 feet (8.2 m), but was most successful with the original 13 feet (4.0 m) wingspan. Wing spans of 27 and 33 feet (8.2 and 10.1 m) were used for the high altitude aircraft. The original 1,700 pounds-force (7.6 kN) of engine thrust was increased to 1,920 lbf (8.5 kN) and later to 2,800 lbf (12 kN) for the high altitude, long range drones. Some models were equipped with wing-mounted fuel tanks to extend their range.

The drones had multiple navigation systems including inertial, Doppler, and LORAN. They were equipped with an analogue computer which controlled speed, altitude, heading, engine settings, sensors and recovery systems. The computer turned all sensors on and off and directed all turns, climbs, dives (as well as the rate of each) and engine power settings. Depending upon a drone's designated mission, the equipment also included:

- Rivet Bounder – a system to jam the guidance signal of SAMs
- TWT – a traveling-wave tube to give it the return of a U-2 or even larger aircraft
- CRL – a system to suppress contrails to reduce visual detection
- HIDE – a system to reduce the aircraft's radar reflectivity
- HEMP – a system to detect interception by enemy fighters and initiate evasive actions
- HATRAC – a system for high altitude flights to detect intercept by either fighter aircraft or surface-to-air missiles and take evasive actions

Sensors included various cameras to satisfy the many different objectives of both low- and high-altitude sorties. These could be fixed, turreted, or scanning horizon-to-horizon film cameras; some provided fine detail of specific targets while others covered large areas. TV cameras that could be zoomed and panned were also installed.

Numerous electronic receivers were built in to the drones. These were designed to intercept communications signals and transmissions of all sorts including radars, data links and ECM. The intercepted data was then transmitted to other aircraft, ground sites or satellites. Some of the receivers could be tuned by an operator in another airplane or on the ground. The function of some receivers was strictly defensive. When they detected and identified a signal as a threat, they would trigger a jamming signal, dispense chaff and/or initiate defensive maneuvers.

The drones had a recovery system and receivers which permitted overriding of the mission program and flying the drone 'by hand'. The recovery sequence was triggered by the flight control computer at the preset position, unless overridden by the Drone Recovery Officer (DRO) in the control vehicle. Normally the drone was picked up by radar as it approached the recovery area and controlled by the DRO. Last minute course corrections were made as necessary and the recovery sequence triggered at the precise point to drop the drone on top of the waiting recovery helicopter. The on-board recovery system consisted of a servomechanism that shut down the engine, deployed a drag chute (to cause the drone to nose over) and opened the main parachute at a preset altitude. The recovery helicopter then flew over the main chute engaging a reinforced catch chute with a set of trailing hooks attached to an internal winch. The drone was then winched up to just below the recovery helicopter and flown back to base. An alternative method of recovery allowed the drone to reach the ground under the main chute. On ground impact a sensor operated a charge that severed the chute risers allowing the drone to be recovered. This method had a higher likelihood of damage and was not preferred.

The DC-130 program was eventually discontinued in the early 2000s, as it was deemed too expensive to support. Launching a single drone required the maintenance and support for the DC-130, the drones, and (unless the drone was permanently expended during a live-fire missile shoot) the drone recovery helicopters such as USN SH-3 or USAF CH-3E and CH-53.

At the outset of the 2003 invasion of Iraq, a U.S. Navy-flown DC-130 dropped three modified Firebees borrowed from the U.S. Air Force. Two other drones were ground-launched. The unmanned aircraft flew over Baghdad spooling out clouds of chaff until they ran out of fuel and crashed; they led the flights of Tomahawk cruise missiles which devastated Baghdad.

== Former Operators ==
United States

- United States Air Force
- United States Navy

== Specifications ==
- Crew:
- USAF: 6 officers: pilot, co-pilot, navigator, remote control officer and 2 launch control officers.
- Can enlist a flight engineer and ART (airborne radar technician); total USAF crew of 8.

== See also ==
Related development

- Lockheed C-130 Hercules
- Lockheed Martin C-130J Super Hercules
- Lockheed AC-130
- Lockheed EC-130
- Lockheed HC-130
- Lockheed LC-130
- Lockheed MC-130
- Lockheed WC-130

Aircraft of comparable role, configuration, and era

- Antonov An-12
- Blackburn Beverley
- Transall C-160
