= Wallace Island Marine Provincial Park =

Provincial park on Wallace Island in British Columbia, Canada

- IUCN category II (national park)
- Location within Vancouver Island Location within British Columbia Location within Capital Regional District
- Interactive map of Wallace Island Marine Provincial Park
- Location: Wallace Island, British Columbia, Canada
- Nearest town: Chemainus
- Coordinates: 48.9428°N 123.5509°W
- Area: 72 ha (180 acres)
- Established: 1990
- Governing body: BC Parks
- Website: Wallace Island Marine Provincial Park

Wallace Island Marine Provincial Park is a provincial park in the Gulf Islands of British Columbia, Canada. The park includes almost all 72 hectares (180 acres) of Wallace Island. Land on the northern side of Princess Cove extending north towards Chivers is private. This long, thin island lies in Trincomali Channel south-west of Galiano Island, and about 2 km (1.2 mi) northeast of Saltspring Island. There are a few hiking trails, and camping is permitted in designated areas.

The island was named for Captain Wallace Houston of HMS Trincomalee, who served in the area in 1853.

== Accessibility ==
Conover Cove, on the western side, and Princess Cove, slightly north of Conover on the western side, are the two anchorages used by pleasure boaters. Conover Cove has a small dock which can accommodate shallow-draft vessels. The island is accessible by private boat. There is no public ferry service.

The park itself can only be accessed by boat. Both Conover Cove and Princess Bay have numerous reefs and shoals surrounding them, and caution is advised.

Once inside the park, there are 18 camping sites, along with hiking trails going all over the park.

== History ==
Panther Point, at the south end, has dangerous rocky reefs which extend well past the island. Following the local tradition of naming hazardous reefs after the ships that found them, Panther Point is named after the Panther, a merchant coal-carrier, which ran aground there in 1874, carrying a full load of coal from Nanaimo. Divers still visit what remains of the ship.

Between 1947 and the mid-1960s the island was developed as a vacation resort. One cabin remains standing and intact, and the remains of a few other guest cabins are still present. David Conover wrote a book, Once Upon an Island, which describes this period of the Island's history. Conover continued the tale in One Man's Island and Sitting on a Salt Spring.

The increasing popularity of the island has attracted tourists and animals alike. Within the last decade there has been a bear and a cougar scare.
