= Olivia Poole =

Indigenous Canadian inventor

- Born: April 18, 1889; Devils Lake, Ramsey County, North Dakota, US
- Died: October 10, 1975 (aged 86); Ganges, Salt Spring Island, British Columbia, Canada
- Other name: Susan Olivia Poole
- Occupation: Entrepreneur
- Known for: Inventing Jolly Jumpers

Susan Olivia Poole (April 18, 1889 – October 10, 1975) was an Indigenous Canadian inventor. She invented the Jolly Jumper, a baby jumper, in 1910, but it was not until 1948 that they were produced for the retail market. They are manufactured in Ontario, Canada. By 1957, the Jolly Jumper was patented.

== Early life ==
Born in 1889 in Devil's Lake, North Dakota, Poole grew up in Minnesota at the White Earth Indian Reservation. She was part Ojibway or Chippewa. At a young age, she observed how women would strap babies to cradle boards, a practice called "papoose". While working in the fields, she also observed how mothers would hang their papooses on tree branches, using leather straps, as a medium for a soft bouncing motion.

== Personal life ==
Poole was a very talented pianist. She studied music at Manitoba, Canada's Brandon College.

Poole married and had seven children, the first a boy named Joseph.

== Invention ==
After the birth of her son Joseph, she put together a swing that resembled the Indigenous practice she remembered as a girl.

Poole used a broom handle and cloth diaper in her first attempts at creating the swing that is now known as "The Jolly Jumper". The broom handle was used as a suspension bar and the diaper for a harness.

After this invention, she moved to Vancouver, British Columbia with her husband in 1942. By the early 1950s, her family convinced her to take the swing commercially. She was awarded a patent in 1957, with the help of her son Joseph. She was one of the first Indigenous Canadian women to be awarded a patent. She later established Poole Manufacturing Co., Ltd, which she sold in the 1960s.

== Later years ==
Poole died at the age of 86 on October 10, 1975, in Ganges, Salt Spring Island, British Columbia, Canada. She is buried at Royal Oak Burial Park Cemetery in Victoria, Capital Regional District, British Columbia, Canada. Her invention is still being sold today. There are over 200 items manufactured under the Jolly Jumper name, including potty trainers, baby accessories, car seats, etc.
