= Emma Stark =

Canadian teacher

- Born: Emily Arabella Stark; February 17, 1856; California, US
- Died: July 31, 1890 (aged 33); Nanaimo, British Columbia, Canada
- Education: Salt Spring Island Central School and Nanaimo high school, Teacher's certificate
- Occupation: Teacher
- Years active: 1874–1890
- Spouse: James Clarke (m. 1878)
- Mother: Sylvia Stark

Emily Arabella "Emma" Stark (born February 17, 1856) was a Canadian teacher. She was the first Black Canadian teacher in Vancouver Island and the first teacher in the new North Cedar School, in 1874.

== Early life ==
Emily Arabella (Emma) Stark was born on February 17, 1856, in California, United States, to parents Louis (1816–1895) and Sylvia Stark (1840–1944), who had been slaves in the United States.

In 1860, Stark arrived with her family on Salt Spring Island, B.C. While on Salt Spring Island, her siblings John Edmond (1860–1930), Abraham Lincoln (1863–1908), Hannah "Anne" Serena (1866–1888) and Marie Albertine (1867–1966) were born. The Estes-Stark family moved to Cedar, Nanaimo, in 1875, where Stark's youngest sister Louisa Edna was born (1878–1971).

== Education ==
Stark attended Salt Spring Island Central School, and she completed secondary school at Nanaimo high school. Her instructor was primarily John Craven Jones, a graduate of Oberlin College. Afterwards, Stark graduated high school; she trained to be a teacher.

== Career ==
Stark became a teacher at the age of 18 years. In August 1874, she was hired to teach in a one-room school in the Cedar District; her starting salary was $40 per month.

She lived in a cabin that was provided for the teacher. Students who lived a long way from the school boarded with Stark, including her younger sister Marie.

== Personal life ==
Stark married James Clarke on December 28, 1878.

== Death ==
In 1890, Stark died at the age of 34 from tuberculosis.
