= Long Harbour =

Long Harbour, or Long Harbor, may refer to:

- Long Harbour (Hong Kong), a harbour in the Hong Kong Special Administrative Region of China
- Long Harbour, British Columbia, a harbour in the province of British Columbia, Canada
- Long Harbour-Mount Arlington Heights, a town on the island of Newfoundland in Canada
