= Apache Cradleboard =

Apache Cradleboard is a bronze sculpture created c. 1994 by Allan Houser. 15 casts were made.

== Style ==
The form of the sculpture is in Houser’s signature style—a blend of modernist styles and Native American art and subject matter. Houser’s figures are highly stylized and don’t represent any one particular person which allow them to represent Southwest and Plains Native American cultures as a whole.

== Themes ==
Mothers and children were one of Houser’s often repeated themes, and he regularly combined them into one form. Family, pride and the history of his tribe, the Apaches, were innately combined for Houser. This pride comes through the facial expressions of his subjects, especially the women. Houser identified with women on a certain level; he stated that when he was creating his art he was “trying to feel like the mother” and be serene. Kim Bourne, former CEO of Allan Houser Inc. said in an interview that “his themes are of nobility and the future and of the wonderful bond that his people on [sic] those stories that he’d heard [about the Apache].” The cradleboard was a significant part of the cultures of tribes living in the southwest, particularly the Apache. Apache mothers would typically make their baby a cradleboard when he or she was a few months old.
