= Sylvia Stark =

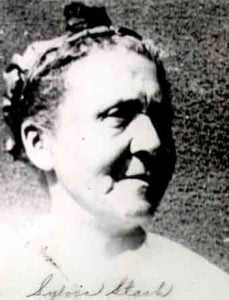
- Born: Sylvia Estes; 1839
- Died: 1944 (aged 104–105)
- Resting place: Ganges Community Cemetery
- Spouse: Louis Stark
- Children: Emma Stark

Sylvia Estes Stark (c. 1839 – 1944) was an African-American pioneer and Salt Spring Island resident, who was among 600 African Americans who migrated during the 1850s to the newly formed Colony of British Columbia.

== Early life ==
Sylvia Estes was born into enslavement in Clay County, Missouri in 1839. She was the youngest of three children of Hannah and Howard Estes. Her mother, worked in a bakery owned by Charles Leopold, and her father was a cowboy for Thomas Estes.

Despite an 1847 ordinance in Missouri prohibiting Black children from learning to read or write, Sylvia secretly taught herself by listening in on the lessons given to the Leopold children.

== Freedom ==
In 1849, during the California gold rush, Sylvia's father went to California with his enslaver, Thomas Estes, to sell livestock, who allowed Sylvia's father to prospect for gold and use the money to purchase freedom for himself and his family.

Upon his return to Missouri, now a free man, Howard purchased the freedom of his wife Hannah, son Jackson, and daughter Sylvia, paying $1,000 each for Hannah and Jackson and $900 for Sylvia, an enormous sum at the time. Thomas Estes refused to provide the freedom papers even after payment. Unwilling to give up, Howard made another $1,000 and sent it directly to Charles Leopold, his wife's enslaver. Thomas Estes claimed this money in a lawsuit but was ultimately forced to provide Howard's papers.

The family then bought 40 acres of land and began farming. However, their newfound freedom was threatened by the rise of white supremacist groups such as the Ku Klux Klan, which terrorized Black communities through violence and kidnappings. To escape this danger, the Estes family decided to leave Missouri for California in 1851.

== Move to California and Marriage ==
In 1851, at age 12, the Estes family left Missouri and headed to Pacerville, California via the Oregon Trial. In 1855, Sylvia married Louis Stark, a farmer, at age 16. Louis, then age 26, had escaped slavery in Missouri and also travelled to California.

In an effort to stave off American expansionism due to the British Columbia Gold Rush, in April 1858, British Columbia Governor James Douglas (governor) sent a letter to the Black community of San Francisco, inviting them to settle British Columbia. Faced with educational and other social barriers, such as the Fugitive Slave Act and the Dred Scott v. Sandford decision, the Estes family, along with many other families, met with Douglas to discuss settling in Canada, called the Pioneer Committee.

== British Columbia ==
Sylvia and her family were among more than 600 Black Americans who emigrated to Canada from California between 1858 and 1859.

In 1858, Stark, with her parents her two small children, Emma Arabella and Willis Otis, traveled up the coast on a ship called the Brother Jonathan and landed in Victoria, BC. Sylvia's parents, Hannah and Howard Estes, bought farmland on Victoria Island. Sylvia and Louis bought land and settled at Vesuvius Bay on Salt Spring Island, bringing along with them 50 head of cattle and horses. The family then cleared land and made a home and orchard. Over the next fifteen years, the Louis and Sylvia stark had four more children at Salt Spring, John Edmond, Abraham Lincoln, Hannah Serena and Marie Albertina. They survived the 1862 Pacific Northwest smallpox epidemic.

In 1868 they moved to Fruitvale on Salt Spring Island. In 1868, Sylvia and her children were baptized at the Ebenezer Church in Nanaimo.

In 1875, the family moved to Cedar, British Columbia, just outside Nanaimo. However, Sylvia missing Salt Spring, returned to the farm in 1885 with her son Willis and her father, Howard, who was now a widower. Sylvia spent the rest of her life on Salt Spring Island and ran the farm in Fruitvale with her son Willis. She died on Salt Spring Island in 1944, aged 105, and was buried beside her father at Pioneer Cemetery, Ganges, Salt Spring Island.

Sylvia's daughter Emma Arabella went on to become the first female Black teacher on Vancouver Island.
