= Dan Jason =

Canadian writer (born 1946)

Dan Howard Jason
- Born: July 22, 1946 (age 80); Montreal, Quebec, Canada
- Citizenship: Canada
- Occupations: writer, businessman

Dan Jason (born July 22, 1946) is a Canadian active in food politics, as an opponent of genetically modified foods and proponent of heirloom plants and seedbanks. He is a writer, lecturer, and runs a business providing heirloom seeds.

Jason is active in food politics, being an outspoken opponent of genetically modified seeds, patents on living organisms, and industrial agriculture in general. He frequently gives lectures at environmental and horticultural events in British Columbia, including Seedy Saturday. He was involved in the founding of Seeds of Diversity Canada and the Seed and Plant Sanctuary for Canada; both are seed banks whose mission is to preserve varieties of vegetables and crops.

He is the founder and owner of Salt Spring Seeds, a mail order seed company that specializes in heritage and heirloom varieties of vegetables and plants. Popular varieties include garlic, beans, tomatoes, lettuce, and grains. The company, founded in 1988, has stocks of many unusual seeds including over 150 tomato varieties.

Jason currently lives on Salt Spring Island, British Columbia with his wife Celeste.

== Publications ==
He has written several books including: The Whole Organic Food Book: Safe, Healthy Harvest from Your Garden to Your Plate, and most recently Saving Seeds as if Our Lives Depended on it.

Jason has been interviewed and been published in a number of publications, including: The Georgia Straight, Canadian Organic Growers Magazine, Seeds of Diversity Canada Magazine, Mother Earth News, Global Public Media, and Salt Spring News.

There is a documentary about Dan Jason: Gardens of Destiny. In this 75 minute production, filmmaker, Jocelyn Demers meets Dan Jason on Salt Spring Island. Dan has been a longtime critic of the non-organic food system in North America. Jocelyn Demers explores Dan's garden and investigates what other experts from the agriculture milieu think about Dan's observations and initiative.
