= Baby walker =

Device to help infants walk

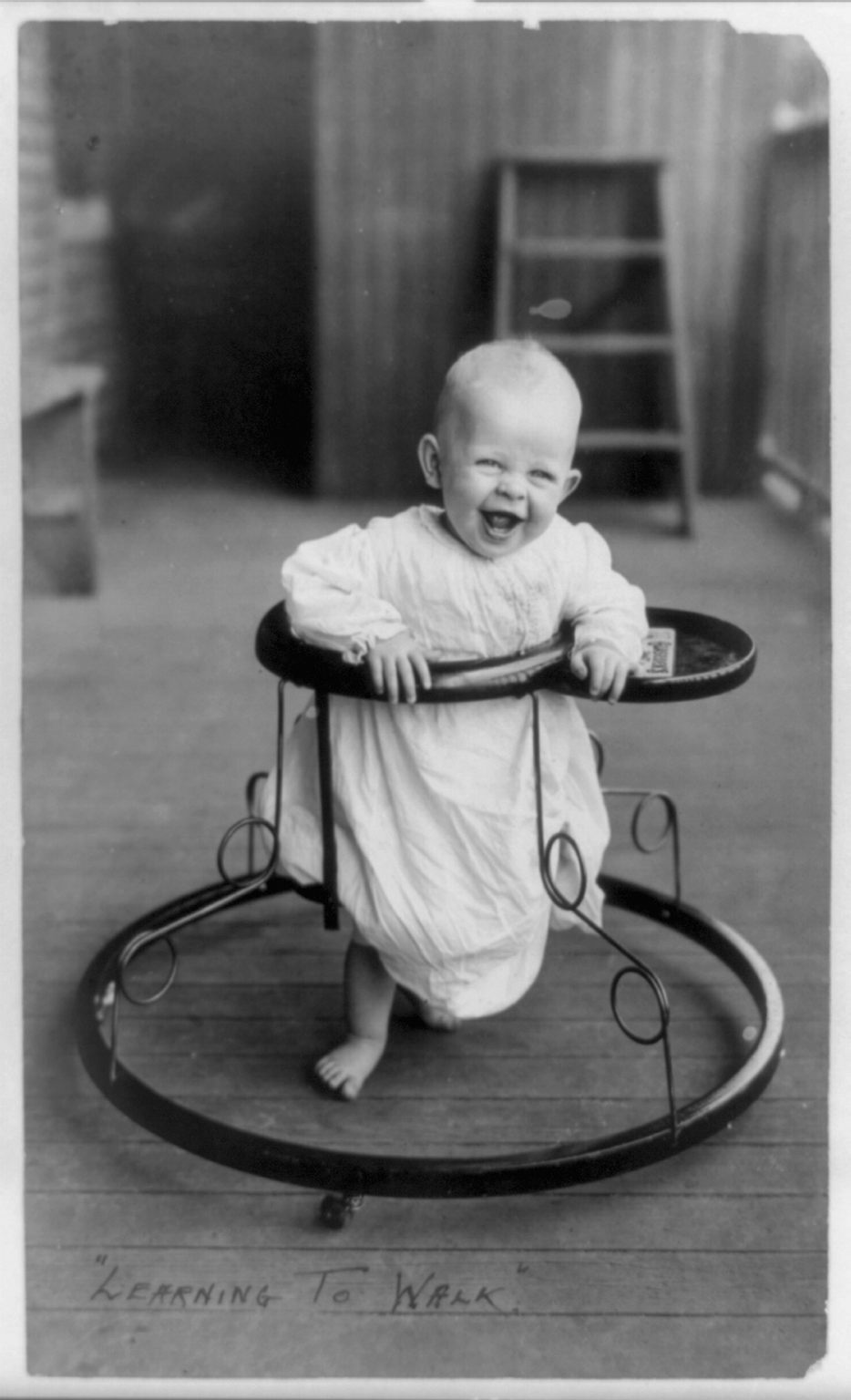
A baby in a baby walker, 1905

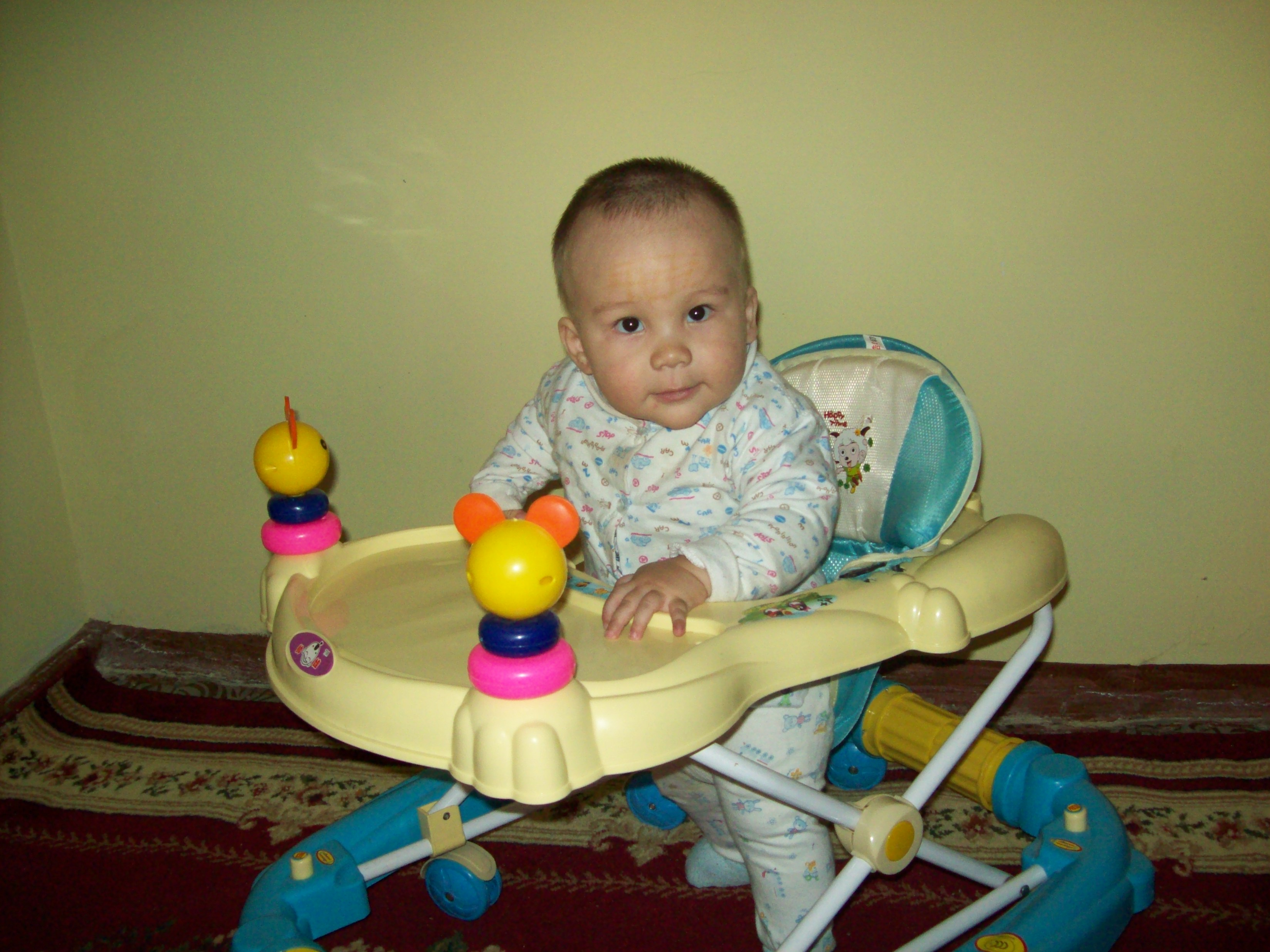
A 6-month-old child sitting in a baby walker

A baby walker is a device that can be used by infants who cannot walk on their own to move from one place to another. Modern baby walkers are also for toddlers. They have a base made of hard plastic sitting on top of wheels and a suspended fabric seat with two leg holes. In the US, baby walkers are responsible for about 2000 injuries annually to children serious enough to require a trip to the emergency room, prompting calls from pediatricians for their outright ban.

== Cause of developmental delays ==
Many parents believe that such walkers teach a child to walk faster. However, they may actually delay walking by two to three weeks for a typical child. The amount of use matters; for every 24 hours babies spend in a baby walker (for example, one hour per day for 24 days), they learn to walk three days later and to stand four days later than they would have.

== Safety issues ==
Baby walkers have also led to many preventable injuries caused by tripping, toppling over, or skidding on wet floors. These include injuries from falling down stairs while moving around in the baby walker, often with injuries that are worse than typical for falling down the stairs. Walkers allow babies to reach areas they otherwise couldn't, including pools, bathtubs, and kitchens, where they can be at risk for burns from pulling boiling food off stovetops. The total number of baby walker-related injuries is likely an underestimation because there are more than 40 different terms used in academic or news reports for these devices, thus complicating a tally of the number of device-related injuries.

The U.S. Consumer Product Safety Commission, American Academy of Pediatrics, Kids In Danger, and other organizations have issued warnings to discourage parents from using baby walkers. Direct education of parents in a medical setting reduces parents' willingness to use these devices.

In Canada, the sale of baby walkers was banned on April 7, 2004. Canada is the first country in the world to ban the sale, importation and advertisement of baby walkers. This ban extends to modified and second hand baby walkers, including those sold at a yard sales or flea markets. The Canadian Consumers Product Safety Improvement Act of 2008 (CPSIA) changed the items that were allowed to be sold at such sales. Owners of baby walkers may be fined up to CA $100,000 or sentenced to up to six months in jail.

In the United States, annual baby-walker-related injuries dropped from around 21,000 in 1990 to around 3,200 in 2003, attributed to publicity about the danger of such devices and voluntary safety improvements by manufacturers. Eight babies died from such injuries between 2004 and 2008. Annual injuries dropped a further 23% after mandatory U.S. Consumer Product Safety Commission standards (adopted in 2010) went into effect, including testing requirements and brakes to prevent stair falls.

== Alternatives ==
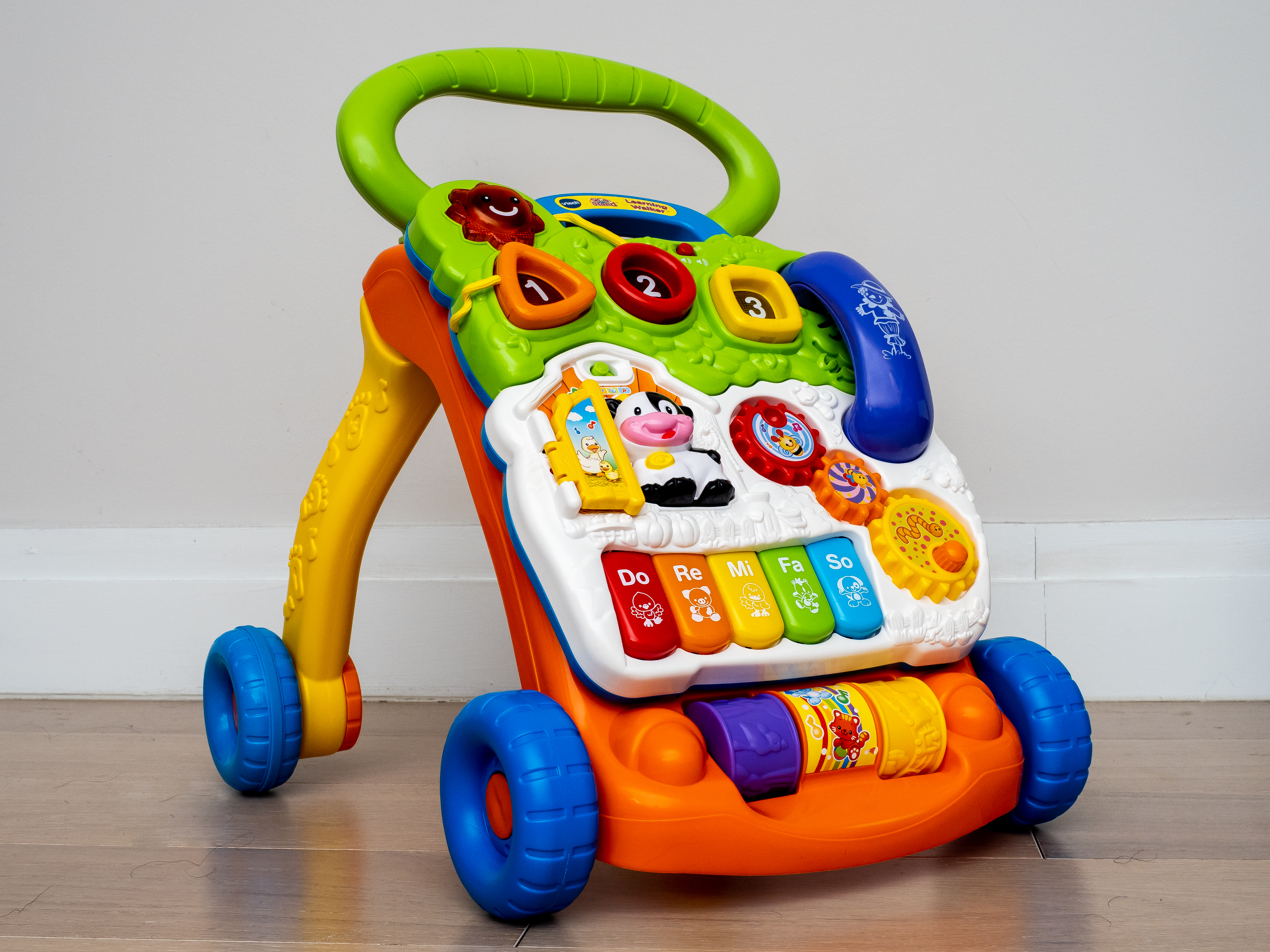
A toy with four wheels and a handle at the top. A toddler can stand behind this toy and push it while walking.

Parent-assisted baby walkers were developed as an alternative to traditional baby walkers. These types of baby walkers differ greatly from traditional baby walkers as they have no wheels and require full parent assistance while in use. The design of modern parent-assisted baby walkers is similar to leading strings in that the child is suspended upright from straps while learning to walk. Parent-assisted baby walkers offer a safer method for teaching a child to walk over traditional baby walkers that can be unattended while in use.

== History ==
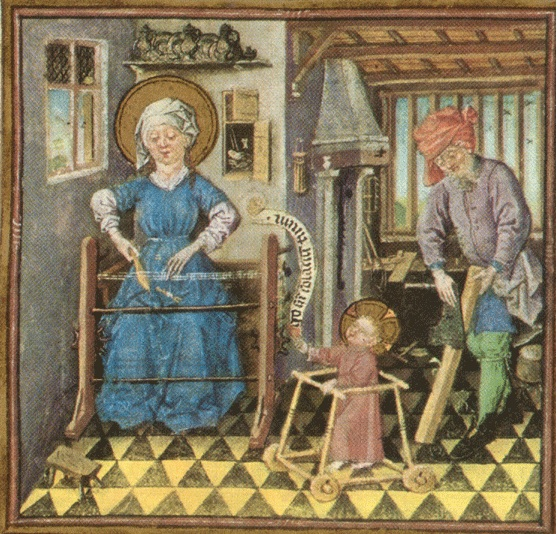
Jesus in a baby walker, The Hours of Catherine of Cleves, c. 1440

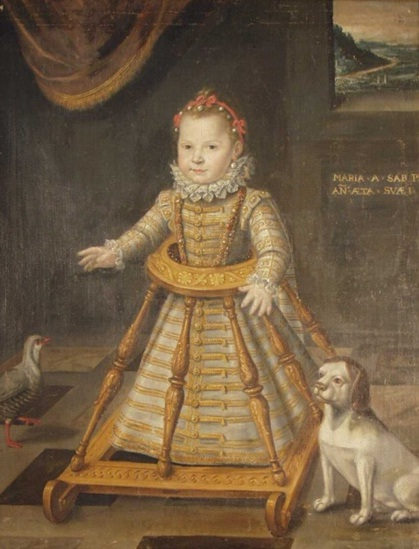
Portrait of Maria Apollonia of Savoy (1594–1656)

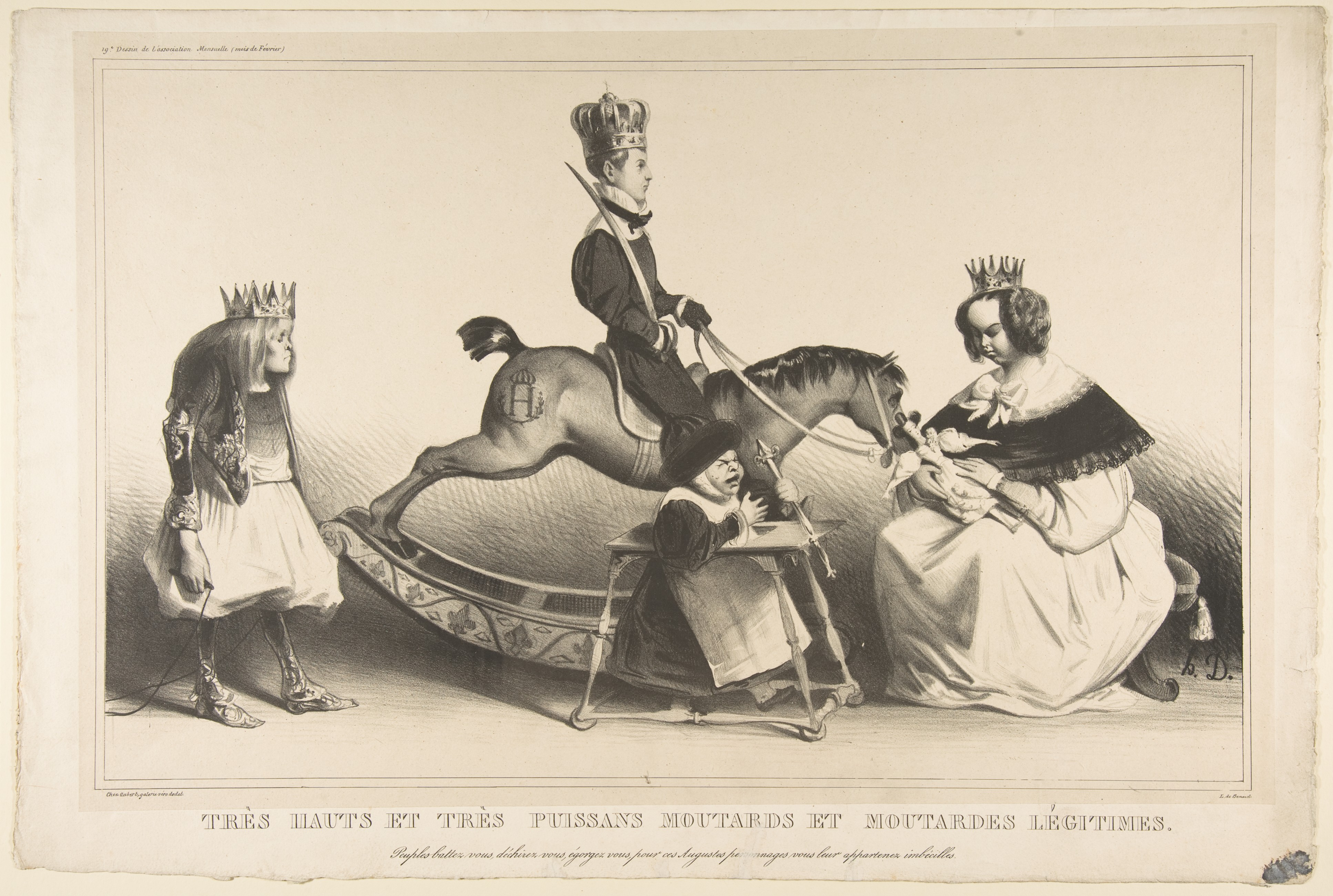
A French painting including a baby walker

Baby walkers were known as early as the 15th century in Europe. An illumination in the Hours of Catherine of Cleves, a Dutch manuscript from that time, depicts the infant Jesus in a wooden baby walker.

Go-cart was a common historical name for the wheeled version. Other alternatives were also used. A baby-runner was a padded wooden ring, set at the height of the baby's waist, on a pole that was fixed into the floor and ceiling. The baby was placed inside the ring and able to move in a circle around the pole. This prevented the baby from reaching dangerous places, such as hot ovens.

== See also ==
- Baby jumper
- Stroller
- Walker (mobility)
