= David Conover =

American journalist

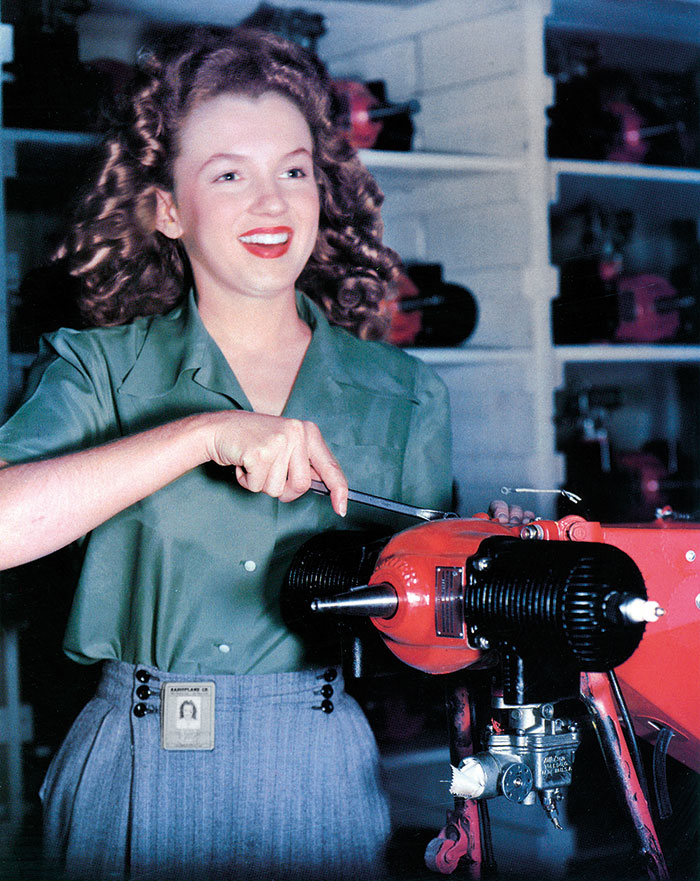
Conover's photo of Marilyn Monroe with a RP-5 (Kodachrome photo) in 1944

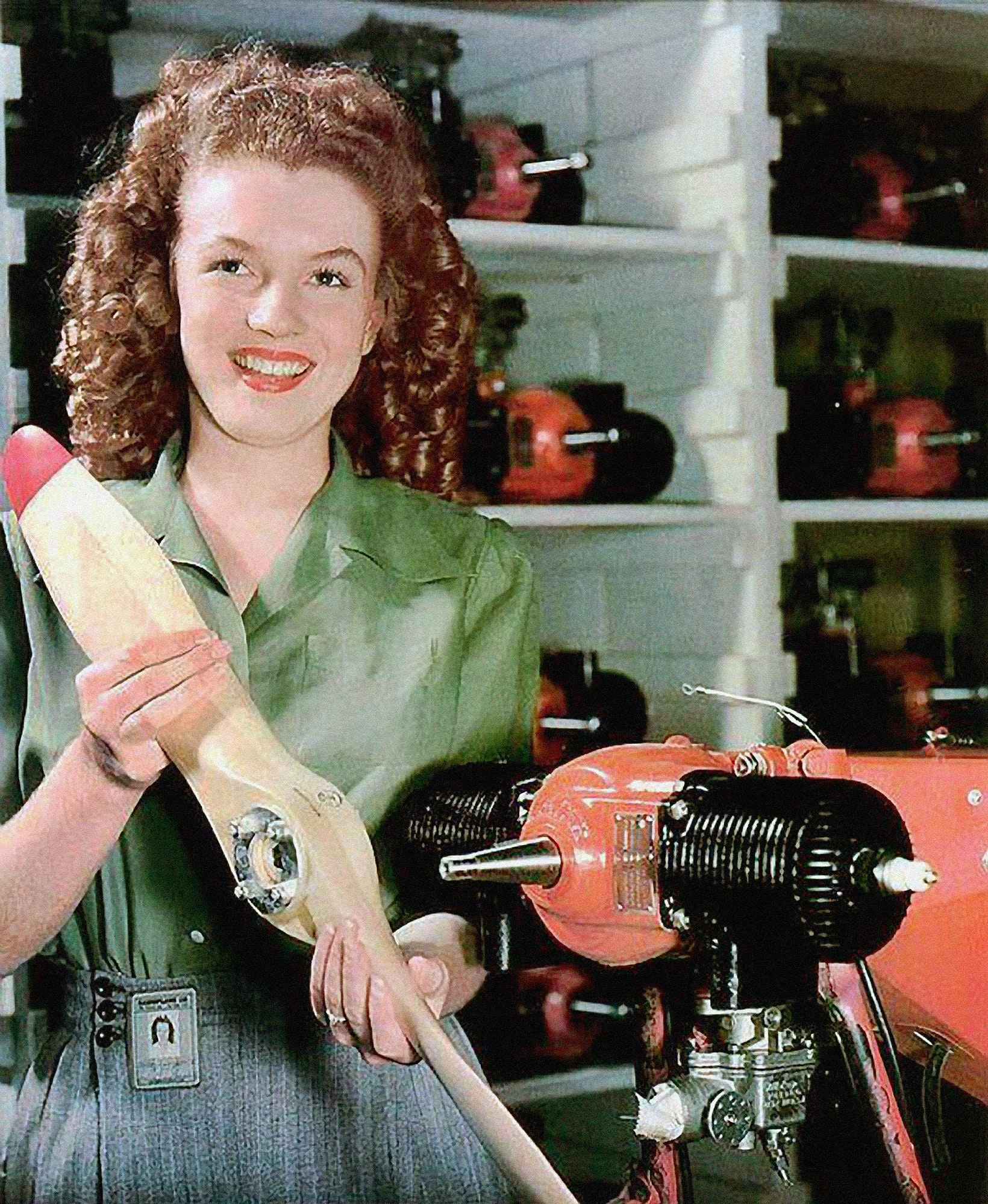
Conover's photo of Marilyn Monroe with a RP-5 prop (Kodachrome photo) in 1944

David Conover (June 26, 1919 – December 21, 1983) was an author and documentary photographer who is credited with discovering Marilyn Monroe while taking photos for Yank magazine. While attached to the U.S. Army Air Forces' First Motion Picture Unit, his commanding officer was future U.S. president Ronald Reagan, who had sent Conover to the Radioplane Munitions Factory, where he discovered Monroe.

His published writings include:

- Once Upon an Island Publisher: San Juan Publishing (November 2003)
- Reader's Digest Condensed Books: Volume 74 - Summer 1968 Publisher: Reader's Digest (1968)
- Best Sellers from Reader's Digest Condensed Books - 1970
- One Man's Island Publisher: General Pub. Co (1971)
- Sitting on a Salt Spring Publisher: Paper Jacks (1978)
- Finding Marilyn: A Romance Publisher: Grosset & Dunlap (1981)

== See also ==
- Salt Spring Island
- Marilyn Monroe
