= Ruckle Provincial Park =

Provincial park in British Columbia, Canada

- IUCN category II (national park)
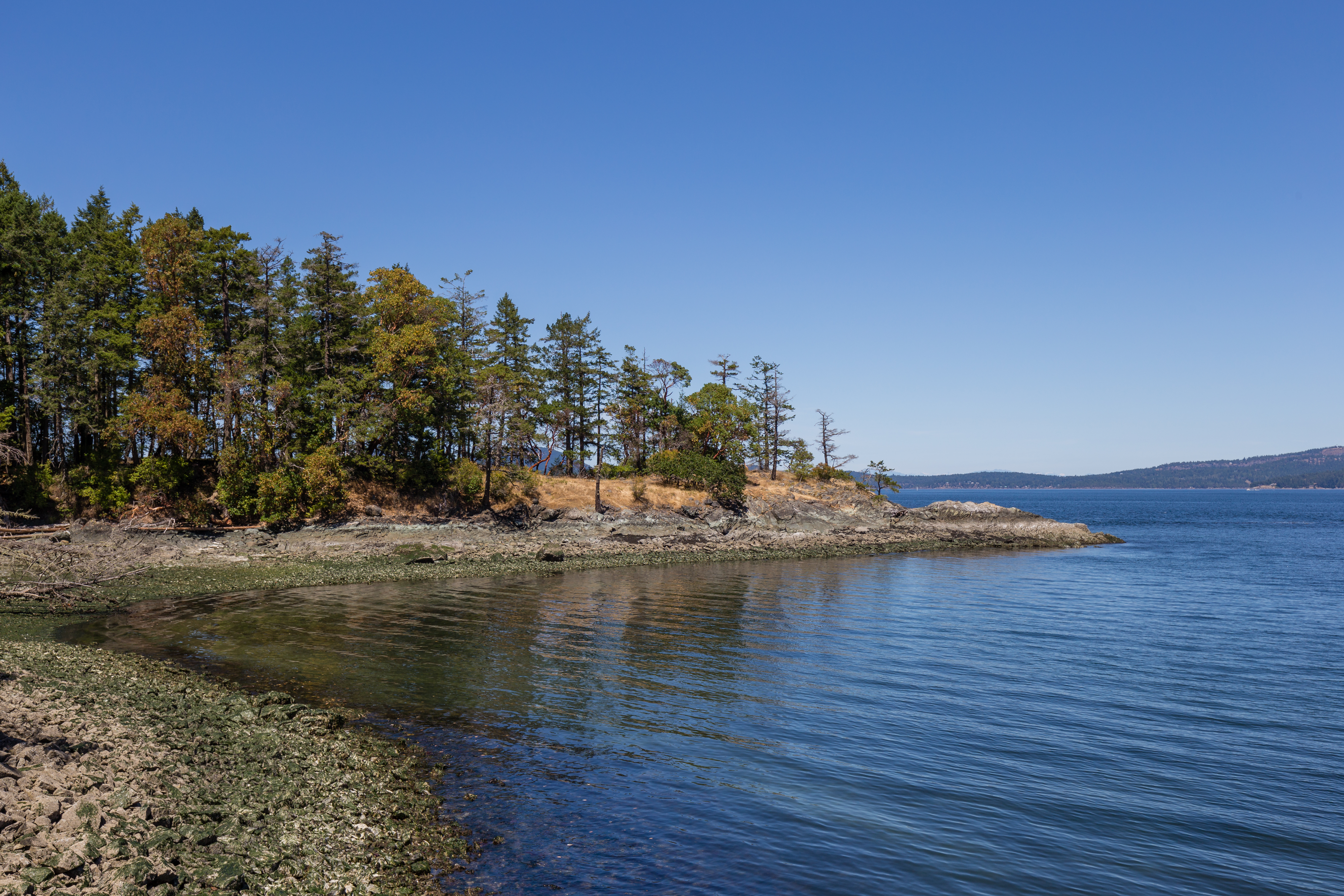
- Panoramic view

- Location within British Columbia
- Interactive map of Ruckle Provincial Park
- Location: British Columbia, Canada
- Nearest city: Sidney
- Coordinates: 48°46′53″N 123°23′22″W
- Area: 5.29 km^{2} (2.04 sq mi)
- Established: June 18, 1974
- Governing body: BC Parks

Ruckle Provincial Park is a provincial park on Salt Spring Island, British Columbia, Canada. It has the largest provincial campground on the Gulf Islands. Partly protected by the park is a historic sheep farm founded by the Ruckle family.
