= Pearl Luke =

Canadian novelist

Pearl Luke (born 21 March 1958) is a Canadian novelist.

Born in Peace River, Alberta, Luke attended University of Calgary and earned first a BA and then an MA in English Literature.

Luke lived in Alberta until 2001, and was active in the literary community, especially in Calgary, where she was an editor-at-large for Dandelion Magazine and worked for book publishers Detselig Enterprises and Thomson/Carswell. She gave many public readings and taught numerous writing workshops. In 2001, she moved to British Columbia and was similarly active in the literary community there. On Salt Spring Island she was a founding member of Salt Spring Writers and Friends, a charity that provides scholarships for beginning writers on the island. From 2008 to 2011 she served on the Author's Committee for the Writers' Trust of Canada.

In her award-winning first novel, Burning Ground, Luke writes a love story about a character working in a fire lookout in northern Alberta. This book won her the 2001 Commonwealth Writers' Prize for Best First Book (Caribbean and Canada Region), and was a finalist for the George Bugnet Award, the Chapters/Robertson Davies First Novel Award and the Libris Award. Burning Ground was based in part on her experiences as a student working summers on various fire towers.

Her second novel, Madame Zee is a fictional account of the life of Mabel Rowbotham, mistress to the infamous Brother Twelve and his 1920s British Columbia cult of "gold, sex, and black magic", as written about by non-fiction author John Oliphant. Madame Zee was a long-list nominee for the International Dublin Literary Award and was selected as a book of the month pick by both Chatelaine and Canadian Living.

A former instructor of Advanced Composition for DeVry University, and writing mentor for the University of British Columbia program Booming Ground, Luke now works as a writing coach and literary editor through her website

Luke stated in an interview that she is out as bisexual.

== Bibliography ==
- Burning Ground (2000) ISBN 0-00-225504-9
- Madame Zee (2006) ISBN 0-00-200513-1
