= One Man's Island =

1971 book

- Author: David Conover
- Publisher: General Publishing Company
- Publication date: 1971
- ISBN: 9780773600164

One Man's Island is a 1971 non-fiction book written by David Conover. It carries on the story begun in Once Upon an Island, but in a totally different style and format. Written some thirteen years after the experience described in Once Upon an Island, this book presents another year in the life of the couple who began their island paradise. This book is based on the diary Conover kept and presents a mixture of his experiences as he was writing his first book and philosophical insights and wisdom which he collected during his life on the island.
