= Long Harbour, British Columbia =

Long Harbour
- Location of Long Harbour in British Columbia
- Coordinates: 48°51′00.1″N 123°26′59.9″W
- Country: Canada
- Province: British Columbia
- Time zone: UTC−07:00 (Pacific Time)
- Area codes: 250, 778

Long Harbour is an inlet on the east side of Salt Spring Island. It hosts a ferry terminal which connects directly to the Lower Mainland via Tsawwassen, British Columbia as well as some of the other southern Gulf Islands. There are several small islets in its waters, including Clamshell Islet, which is covered with numerous prickly pear cacti. There is also a Royal Vancouver Yacht Club and a Royal Victoria Yacht Club outstation facility.
