= Baby jumper =

Play device for infants

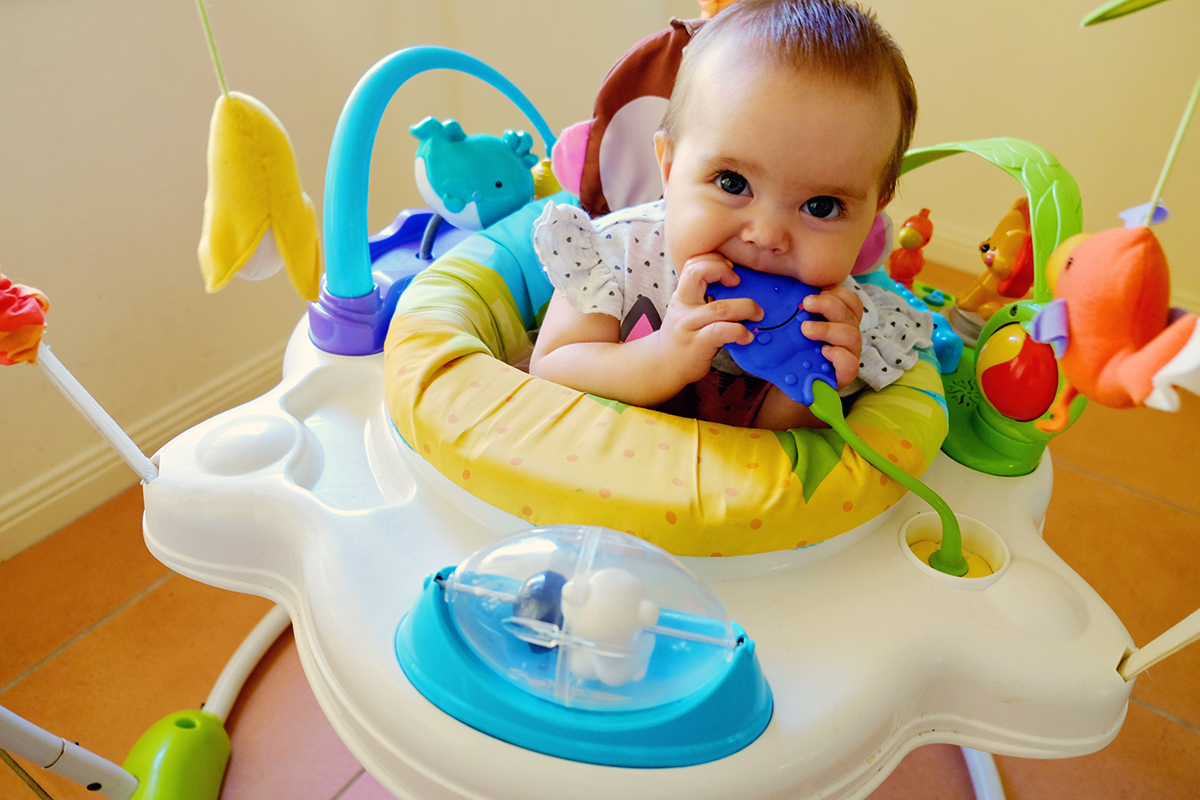
Baby in a stationary activity baby jumper

A baby jumper is a device that can be used by infants to exercise and play in. The original baby jumper consists of a hoop suspended by an elastic strap. More elaborate baby jumpers have a base made of hard plastic sitting in a frame and a suspended fabric seat with two leg holes, often with trays holding toys. The door jumpers lack the tray. There are also mobile play centers (baby walkers), which look very similar to baby jumpers, but which have wheels.

== History ==
The Jolly Jumper brand refers to a Native American origin, where mothers used cradleboards to keep their infants in when travelling or working. When working outside, the mother could attach the cradleboard to a tree limb using its straps. By pulling the limb, thus causing a bouncing motion, the baby would be soothed. Jolly Jumper claims to have invented the baby jumper in 1910, using an axe handle for the spreader; however, the baby jumper existed long before that. In the 1880s, various patents were granted for a “new and improved” baby jumpers, while in the 1930s, Goodyear foresaw the use of latex for baby jumpers.

== Risks ==
Some professionals warn against potential safety issues when using a jumper for prolonged periods of time, claiming that it could cause muscle imbalance if the baby is placed in a sitting position before they would be able to on their own. Another concern is the clamp causing damage to drywall and/or ripping door-casing trim off, due to changes in home construction standards, causing both the jumper and baby to fall to the floor, injuring the baby. Choice, an Australian consumer organization, warns against the use of door jumpers because of the risk of the door clamps breaking. The Government of Canada also warns about the head injuries linked to the use of suspended baby jumpers.
