= Cradleboard =

Indigenous baby carrier

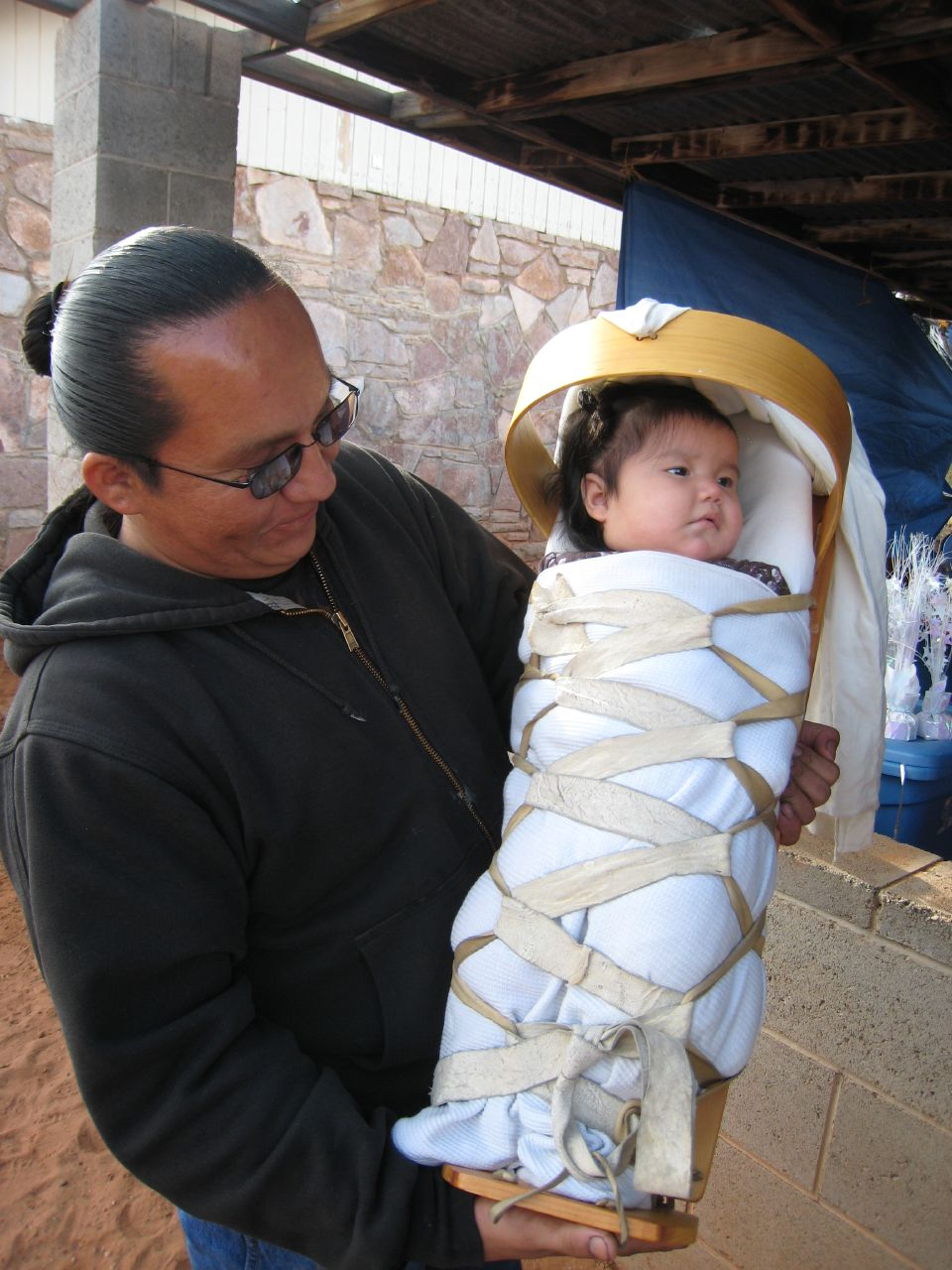
A Navajo-style cradleboard

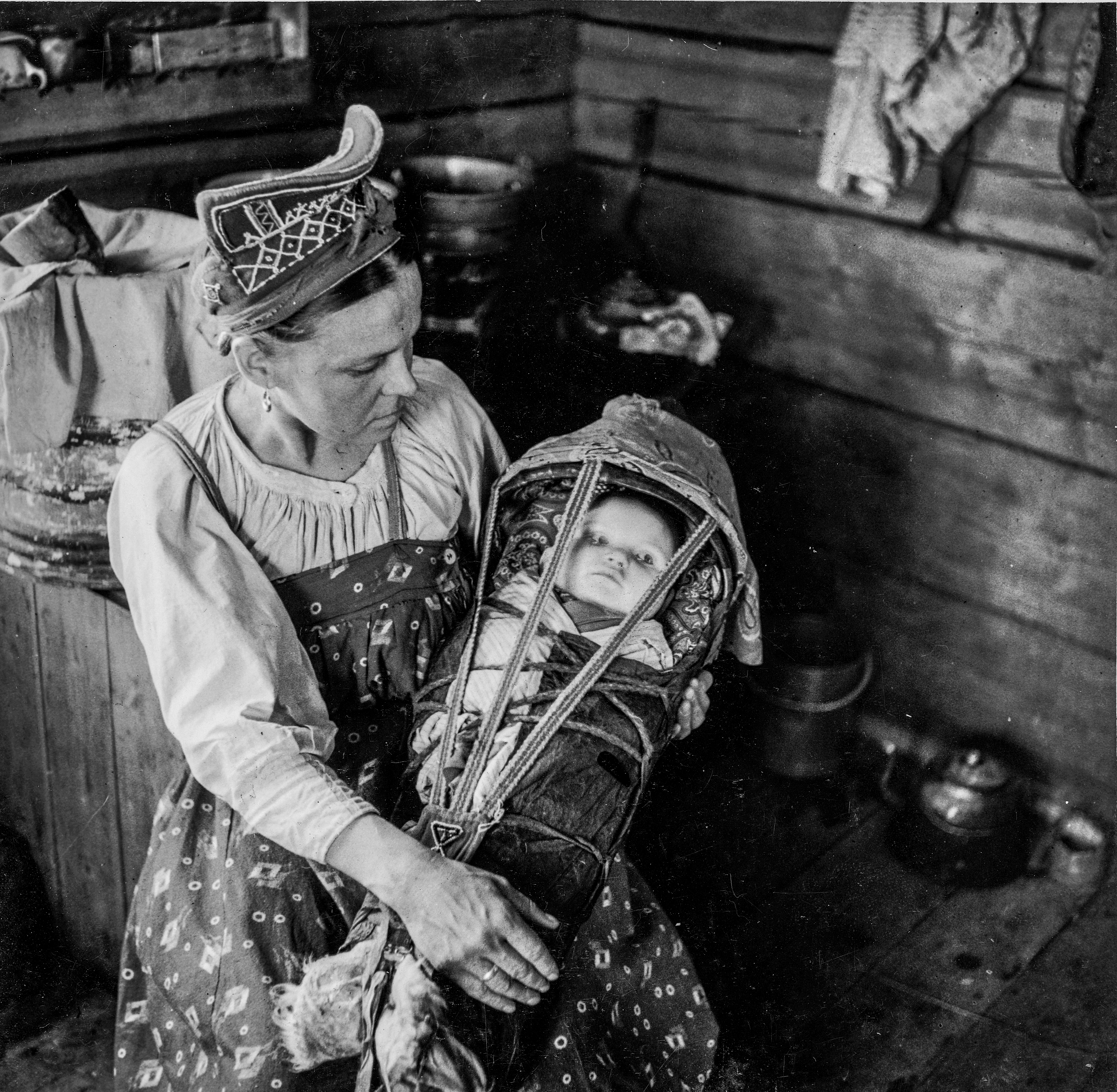
A Skolt Sámi mother with her child in a ǩiõtkâm

Cradleboards (Cheyenne: pâhoešestôtse, Navajo: awéétsʼáál, Northern Sami: gietkka, Skolt Sami: ǩiõtkâm, Inari Sami: kietkâm, Pite Sami: gietkam, Kazakh: бесік, Kyrgyz: бешік) are traditional protective baby-carriers used by many indigenous cultures in North America, throughout northern Scandinavia among the Sámi, and in the traditionally nomadic cultures of Central Asia. There are a variety of styles of cradleboard. Many Central Asian communities and some indigenous communities in North America still use cradleboards.

== Structure ==
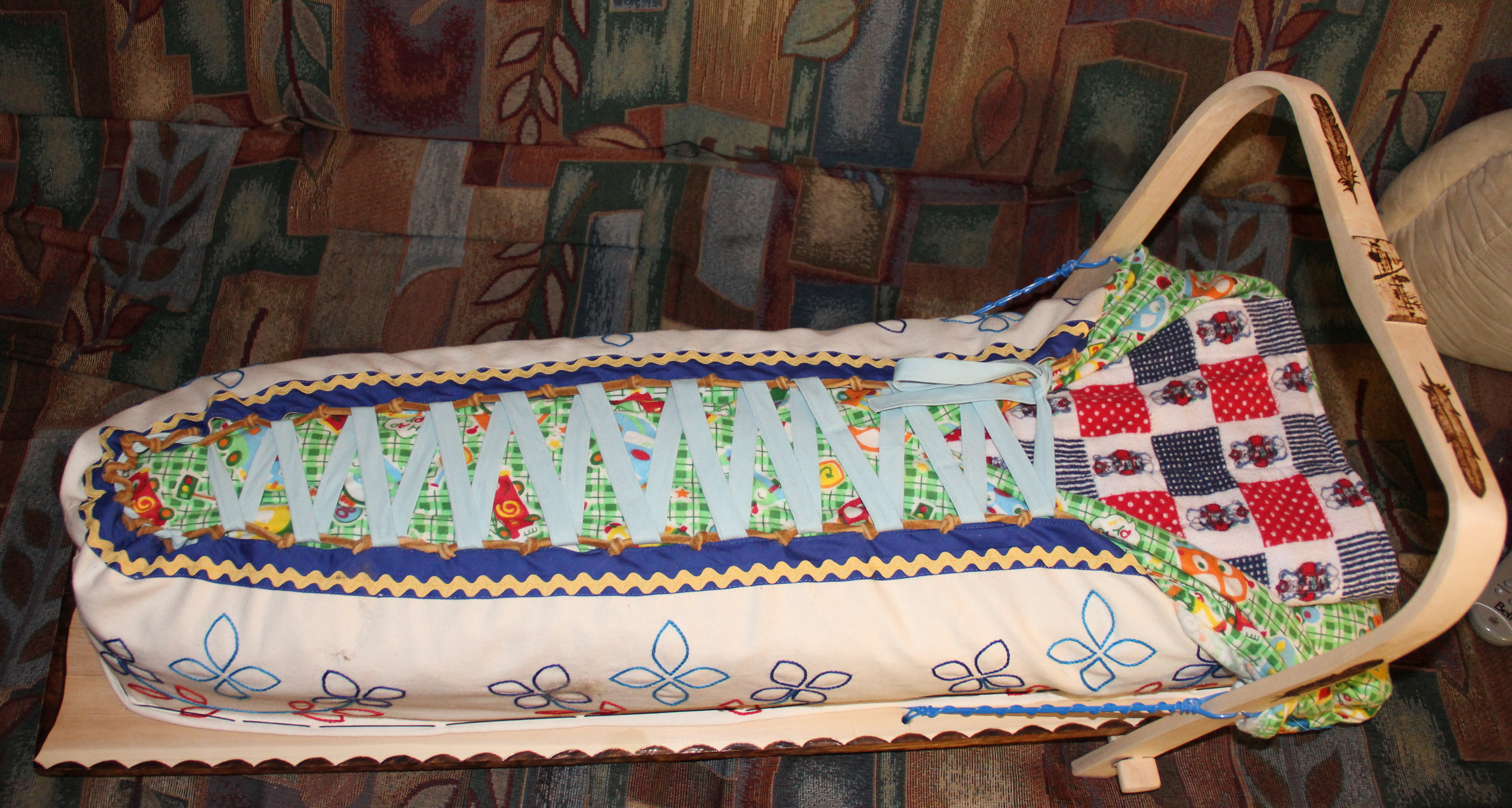
Atikamekw cradleboard

Cradleboards are used for the first few months of an infant's life, when a portable carrier for the baby is a necessity. Some cradleboards are woven, as with the Apache. Woven cradleboards are made of willow, dogwood, tule, or cattail fibres. Wooden cradleboards are made by the Iroquois and Penobscot. Navajo cradleboards are made with a Ponderosa pine frame with buckskin laces looped through the frame.

Whatever materials are used to make cradleboards, they share certain structural elements. Cradleboards are built with a broad, firm protective frame for the infant's spine. A footrest is incorporated into the bottom of the cradleboard, as well as a rounded cover over the infant's head that arcs out from the cradleboard, similar to a canopy or a modern-day baby carriage hood. The purpose of this headpiece is to provide shade for the infant, since it could be covered with an animal skin, or a blanket in winter to protect against the elements in colder climates. The headpiece also provides extra head protection in case anything bumps against the cradleboard. Ornaments and sacred amulets are often attached to the headpiece as well, for example "beaded umbilical cord cases, and dream catchers or medicine wheels", to amuse and help the infant develop his or her eyesight.

The inside of the cradleboard is padded with a lining of fresh plant fibres, such as sphagnum moss, cattail down, or shredded bark from juniper or cliffrose. The lining serves as a disposable diaper, although the Navajo could clean and reuse the lining made of shredded juniper or cliffrose bark. These plant fibres have antiseptic properties, and thus nurture healthy skin in the infant. The Chippewa tradition was to make a lining for the cradleboard usually from moss growing in cranberry marshes, which is smoked over a fire to kill insects, then rubbed and pulled to soften it. In cold weather, the infant's feet may be wrapped in rabbit skin with the fur facing inward. The moss lining is surrounded by a birch bark tray insert placed into the cradleboard, which could be removed for cleaning.

Cradleboards used in Central Asia are often freestanding of varying heights and often made of walnut. The wood frames are often ornately carved and painted, with a cloth drape to shield the infant from light.

== Use ==
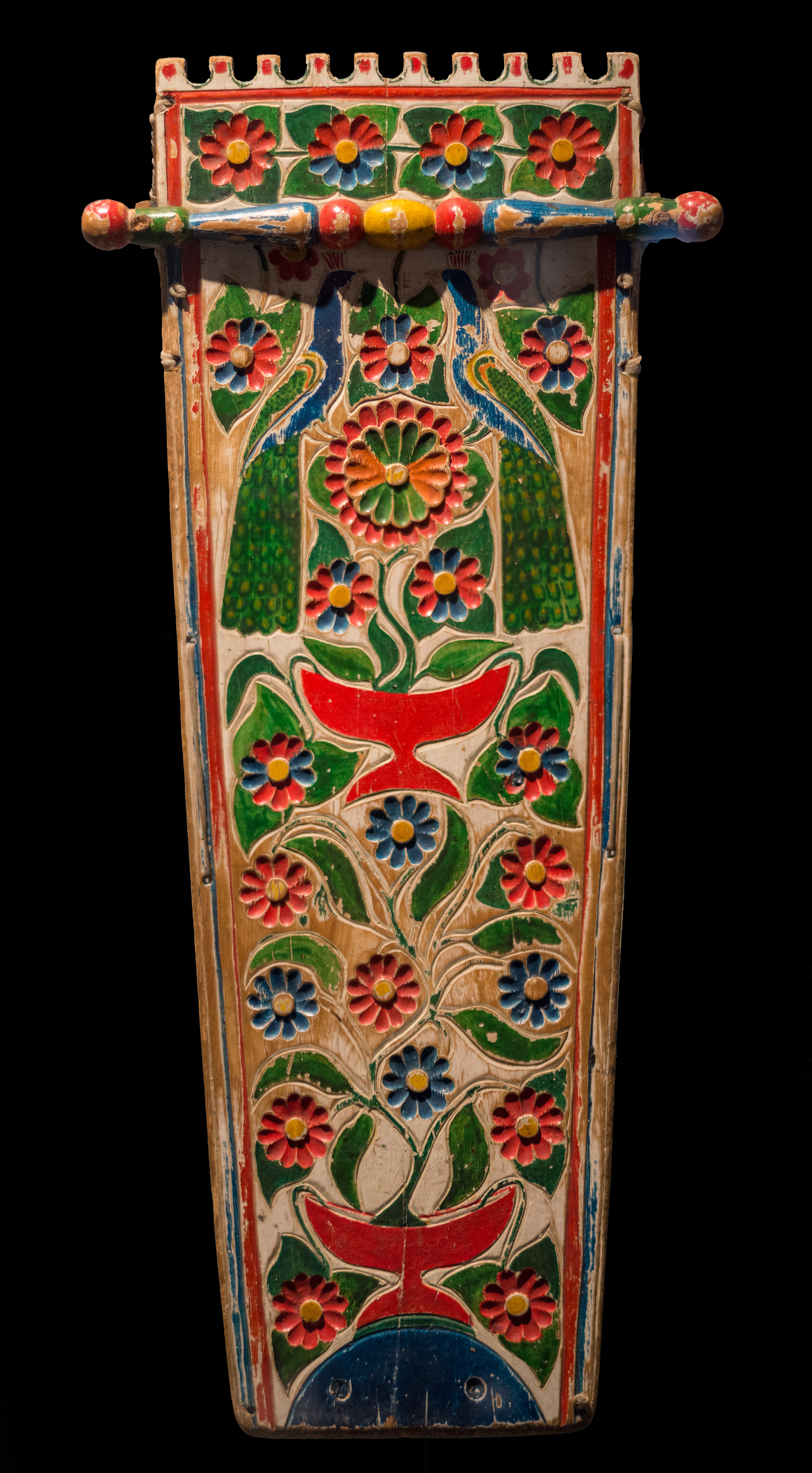
Iroquois cradle board

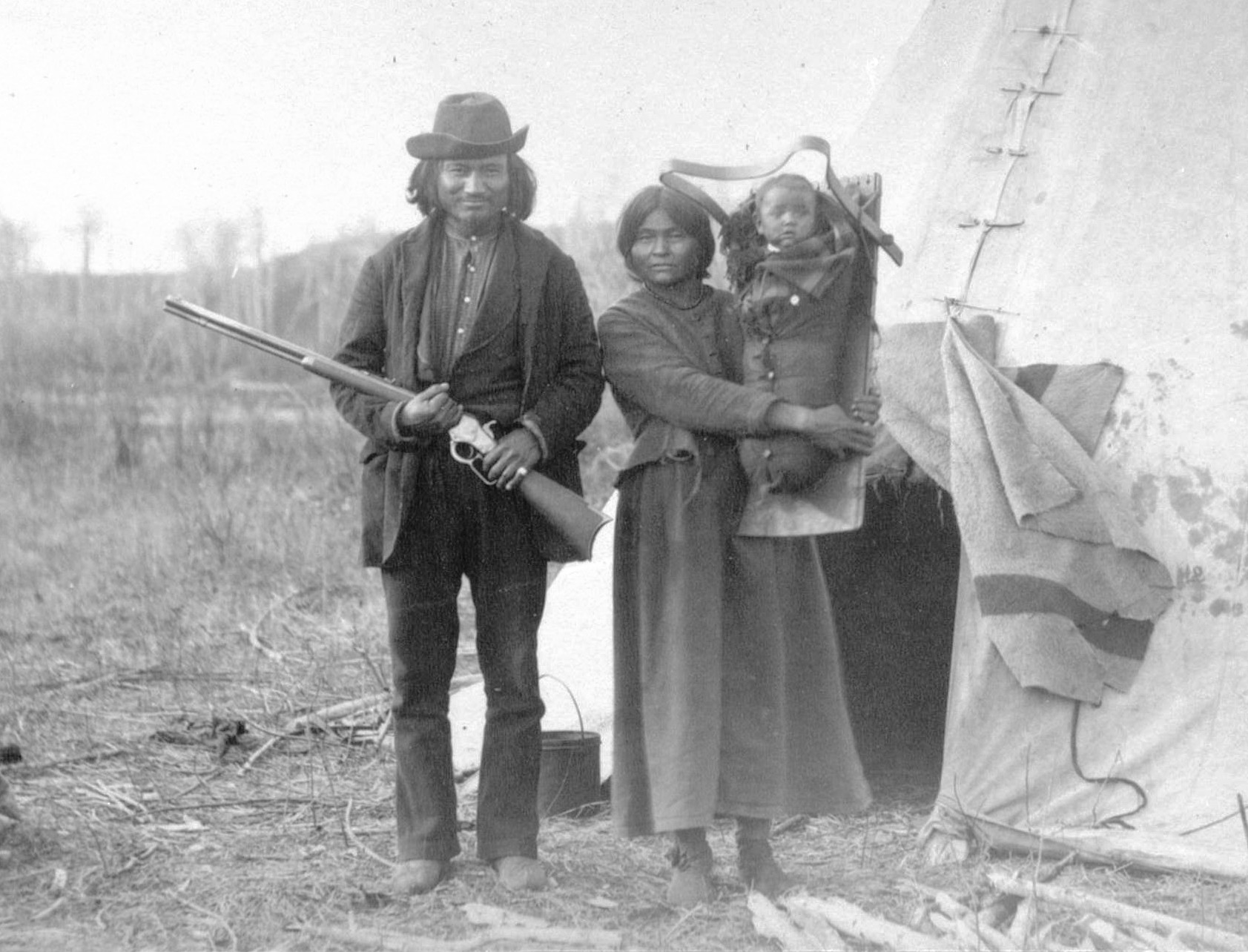
James Quesace, his wife and their infant in north west Manitoba, Canada, in 1886.

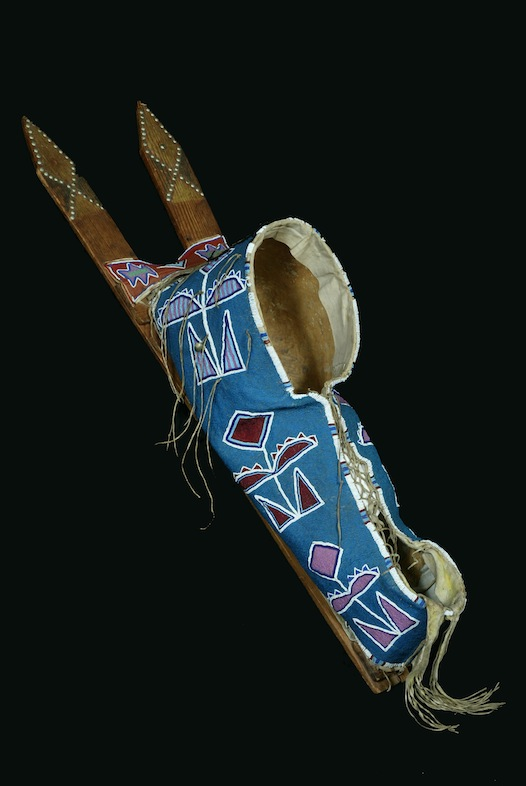
Kiowa cradle board in the Indianapolis Children's Museum

Cradleboards have been used in cultures ranging from the sub-Arctic regions of present-day Canada, down to Mexico and Central America. In Arctic regions, cold weather does not make a cradleboard feasible for the infant's survival, and infants are carried by being placed in a sling worn under the mother's parka. Cradleboards were widely used by indigenous people across present-day North America. Cradleboards are used by the Kickapoo people in Mexico and were used by Aztecs and the Seri people and Mayan communities as far south as Belize. In present-day South America, most indigenous cultures used slings or pouches, sometimes called a rebozo, for carrying infants rather than cradleboards. Cradleboards were used as in the Americas as far south as the Patagonia region.

Cradleboards were used during periods when the infant's mother had to travel or otherwise be mobile for work, and needed to protect the infant. The cradleboard could be carried on the mother's back, using support from "tumplines", or "burden straps" that would wrap around her forehead, chest or shoulders; if she carried a pack as well as the cradleboard, the pack strap would go around her chest and the cradleboard strap would go around her forehead. The cradleboard can also be stood up against a large tree or rock if the infant is small, or hung from a pole (as inside an Iroquois longhouse), or even hung from a sturdy tree branch. They were also used when longer travel was required, as the cradleboard could be attached to a horse for transportation.

In the southwest United States and northern Mexico, among cultures such as the Hopi and Apache, infants would spend most of their day and night in the cradleboard, being taken out of it for progressively longer periods, for up to five times per day. When the infant reaches the age when it can sit up unsupported, it is then gradually weaned from the use of the cradleboard, and spends progressively less time in it. At this time, the infant may use a second, larger cradleboard that replaces the first. By the time the infant is a year old and begins to walk, they are generally finished with cradleboard use.

Cradleboard use and its effect on mother-infant interaction has been studied in Navajo communities. It has been shown that cradleboard use has no significant negative effect on this development. In the first few months of infancy, cradleboards have a soothing effect on babies. After 6 months of age or more, infants begin to resist being placed in cradleboards more vigorously as they become more mobile, and they are often placed in the cradleboard with their arms and hands free, so that they can play with objects hung from the cradleboard for their amusement.

Contemporary opinions on the usage of the Kyrgyz beshik have been collected in the Kyrgyz Republic. In the capital city of Bishkek, there was a direct correlation between the level of Russification and the likelihood to use the traditional cradleboard where households who spoke Russian at home were least likely to use it. In an additional study comparing these attitudes to the southern regions of Kyrgyzstan, such as Jalalabad and Osh, the initial findings were supported with further evidence showing families who did not speak Russian at home were much more likely to use the traditional cradleboard. More than 90% of mothers surveyed in the southern provinces of the Kyrgyz Republic had used the traditional cradleboard.

=== Modern-day use ===
Another purpose for a cradleboard is to use it as a toy, mainly for young girls. The toy was usually a gift for families and would be handed down through generations. It was a costly item to make.

Cradleboards are still used, mainly by tribes, but are not commonly known anymore.

== Developmental dysplasia of the hips ==
Cradleboard use has been associated with increased incidence of developmental dysplasia of the hip. The technique requires straightening the legs, which encourages dislocation of the femur and malformation of the acetabulum. This can be avoided by placing padding between the baby's legs to keep the knees slightly bent with the hips angled outward. Some modern cradleboard users contend that the small 1968 study of Navajo babies was intentionally designed to denigrate a traditional cultural practice, although a 2012 study produced hip dysplasia in laboratory rats by subjecting them to similar conditions.

== See also ==
- Baby jumper
- Baby sling
- Baby transport
- Papoose
- Swaddling
